= OGF =

OGF can refer to:

- Open Gaming Foundation for role-playing games
- Open Grid Forum for grid computing
- Ordinary generating function in mathematics
- Opioid growth factor, an alternative name for met-enkephalin
- OpenGeofiction, an online collaborative fantasy mapping project
