= Westerheim =

Westerheim can refer to several places:

- Westerheim Township, Minnesota
- Westerheim, Baden-Württemberg, Germany
- Westerheim, Bavaria, Germany
