= Diether Kunerth =

German painter and sculptor (1940–2024)

Diether Kunerth (10 August 1940 – 11 December 2024) was a German contemporary artist who lived in Ottobeuren, Upper Swabia.

== Life and career ==
Diether Kunerth was born in 1940 in Freiwaldau in the Reichsgau Sudetenland. He studied from 1960 to 1967 at the Academy of Fine Arts in Munich, where he was a master-class student of Prof. Kirchner.

Kunerth soon left Munich to work in Ottobeuren, where he expanded his body of work. In consideration of Kunerth's artistic significance, the municipality of Ottobeuren established the Museum of Contemporary Art – Diether Kunerth (German: Museum für zeitgenössische Kunst – Diether Kunerth), which cost €4.7 million to construct and was co-funded by the state of Bavaria and the EU. The museum opened on 24 May 2014.

Kunerth died on 11 December 2024, at the age of 84.

== Exhibitions (selection) ==
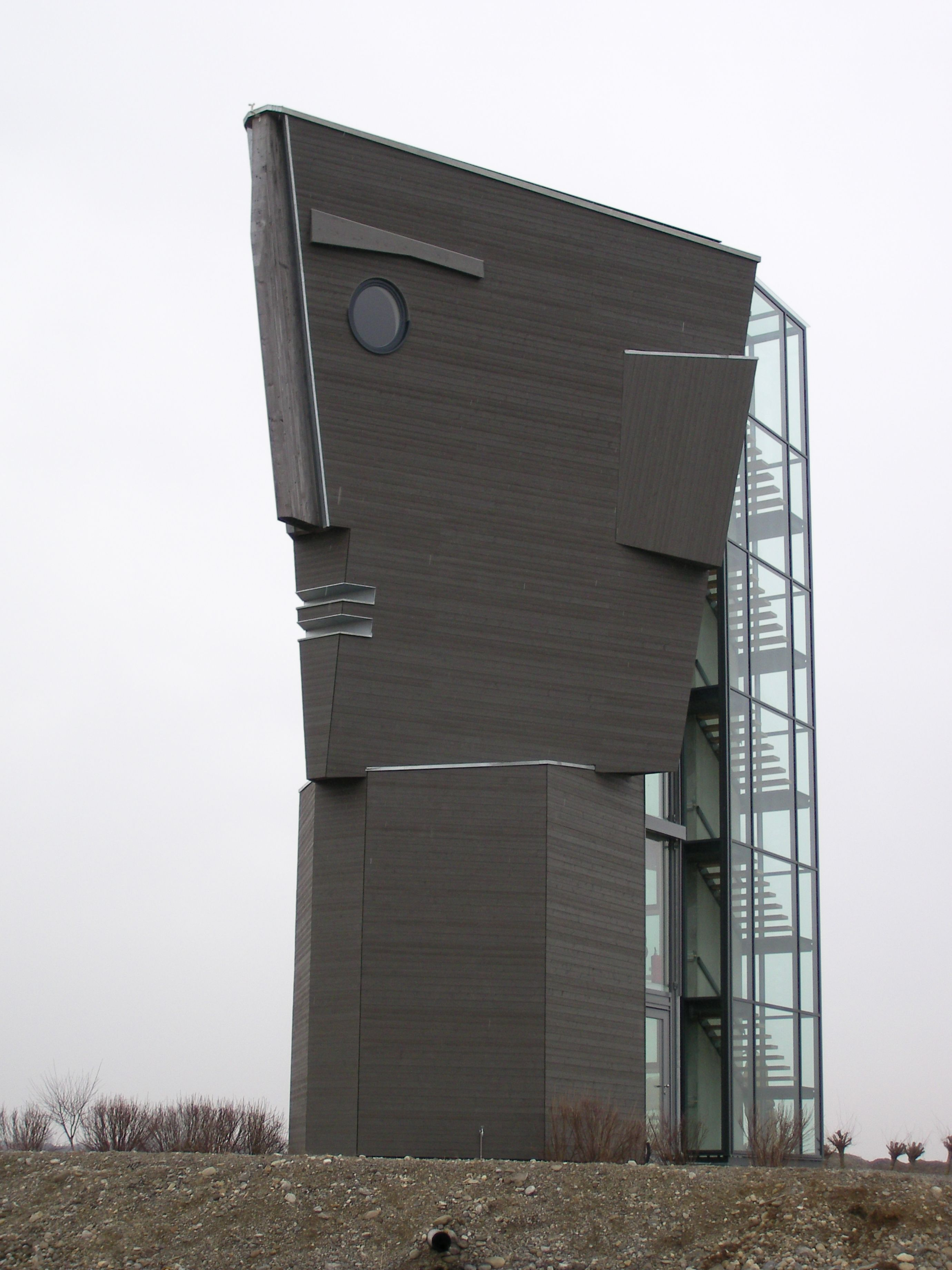
Office building "Holzkopf" by Diether Kunerth in Erkheim

=== Solo exhibitions ===
- Galerie Gurlitt, Munich (1964, 1967)
- Landesmuseum Detmold (1977)
- Dobler Hau, Kaufbeuren (1977)
- Schaezler Palais, Augsburg (1978)
- Galerie Lüpfert, Hannover (1978, 1986)
- Städtische Galerie, Paderborn (1980, 1981)
- Städtische Galerie, Stade (1981)
- Galerie von Braunbehrens, Munich (1985)
- Galerie Neuendorf, Memmingen (1986–2004)
- Brechthaus, Augsburg (1986)
- Galerie in der Finkenstraße, Munich (1987)
- Städtische Galerie, Bielefeld (1987)
- Universität, Bielefeld (1989)
- made Galerie, Thannhausen (1990)
- Galerie Tabula, Tübingen (1990)
- Städtische Galerie, Leutkirch (1990)
- EP-Galerie, Düsseldorf (1991, 1995–1997)
- Kreuzherrnsaal, Memmingen (1992)
- Haus des Gastes, Bad Grönenbach (1993, 1997)
- Kornhaus, Kirchheim/Teck (1994)
- Paris-Haus, Memmingen (1994)
- Theaterfoyer, Memmingen (1995)
- Johanniterhalle, Schwäbisch Hall (1997)
- Schloß Elbroich, Düsseldorf (1996)
- Art Cabinet, Nantucket, USA (1996, 1998)
- Toskanische Säulenhalle, Augsburg (1997)
- Marktplatz Ottobeuren (2002)
- St. Ulrich Basilika, Augsburg (2003)
- Basilika Ottobeuren (2003)
- Stadttheater Memmingen (2003)
- Museum für zeitgenössische Kunst – Diether Kunerth, Ottobeuren (2014–2015)

=== Group exhibitions ===
- Museo Würth, La Rioja
- Museum Würth, Künzelau
- Design Fair, New York
- Galerie Neuendorf, Memmingen
- Künstlerhaus Thurn und Taxis, Bregenz
- Echnaton Galerie, Kairo, Ägypten
- Galerie Yanagizawa, Tokyo
- Galerie Marquit, Boston, USA
- Museo d'arte moderna e contemporanea Trento e Rovereto (MART), Arte Sella Documenta
- Galleria d'Arte Moderna e Contemporanea (GAMeC) di Bergamo, Accademia Carrara
- Art Miami, International Modern & Contemporary Art
- Nevin Kelly Gallery, Washington DC
- Design Fair, New York
- Dunap Galerie, Budapest, Ungarn
- Expo Hannover

== Awards ==
- 1970: Kunstpreis des Regierungsbezirks Schwaben
- 1978: Kulturpreis der Stadt Memmingen
- 1985: Großer Sieben-Schwaben-Preis Augsburg
- 1988: Bürgerpreis der Stadt Kempten (Dachser Preis)
- 2000: Strigelpreis der Stadt Memmingen

== Works ==
- 1996: world's largest wooden head, Erkheim
