= World map (disambiguation) =

A world map is a map of Earth.

World map may also refer to:

- Wikipedia's interactive world map
- International Map of the World, an international project to produce topographic maps of terrestrial portions of Earth at the one to one million scale
- Overworld, an area within a video game that interconnects all its levels or locations in

== See also ==
- A Map of the World, a novel by Jane Hamilton
- Fantasy cartography, for maps of fictional worlds
- "Map of the World", a song Marillion from the album Anoraknophobia
- World
- Portal:Atlas
