= Johann Homann =

German geographer and cartographer (1664–1724)

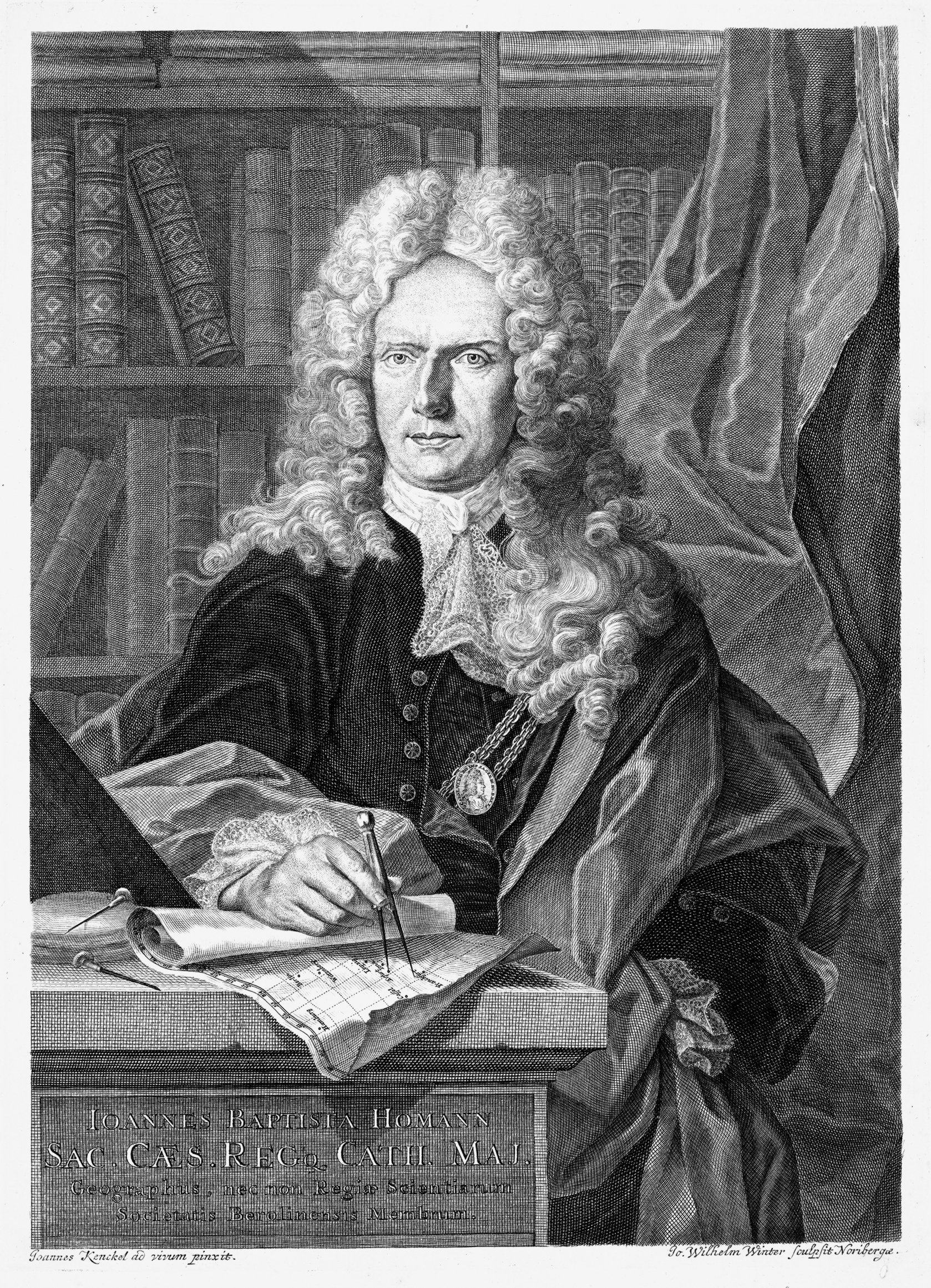
Johann Homann

Johann Baptist Homann (20 March 1664 – 1 July 1724) was a German geographer and cartographer, who also made maps of the Americas.

== Life ==
Homann was born in Oberkammlach near Kammlach in the Electorate of Bavaria. Although educated at a Jesuit school, and preparing for an ecclesiastical career, he eventually converted to Protestantism and from 1687 worked as a civil law notary in Nuremberg. He soon turned to engraving and cartography; in 1702 he founded his own publishing house.

Homann acquired renown as a leading German cartographer, and in 1715 was appointed Imperial Geographer by Holy Roman Emperor Charles VI. Giving such privileges to individuals was an added right that the Holy Roman Emperor enjoyed. In the same year he was also named a member of the Prussian Academy of Sciences in Berlin. Of particular significance to cartography were the imperial printing privileges (Latin: privilegia impressoria). These protected for a time the authors in all scientific fields such as printers, copper engravers, map makers and publishers. They were also very important as a recommendation for potential customers.

In 1716 Homann published his masterpiece Grosser Atlas ueber die ganze Welt (Grand Atlas of all the World). Numerous maps were drawn up in cooperation with the engraver Christoph Weigel the Elder, who also published Siebmachers Wappenbuch.

Homann died in Nuremberg in 1724. He was succeeded by his son Johann Christoph (1703–1730). The company carried on upon his death as Homann heirs company, managed by Johann Michael Franz and Johann Georg Ebersberger. After subsequent changes in management the company folded in 1852. The company was known as "Homann Erben", "Homanniani Heredes", or "Heritiers de Homann" abroad.

Maps

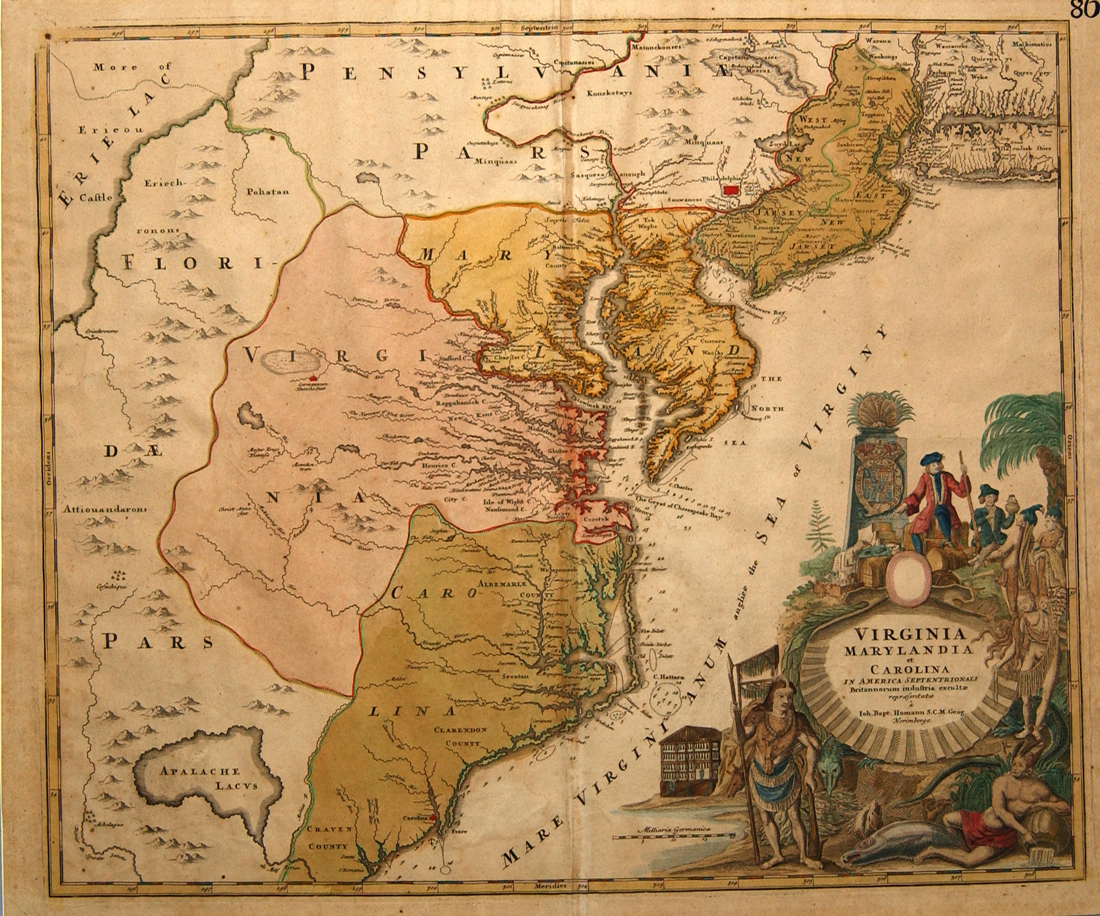
Virginia Marylandia et Carolina, c. 1714.

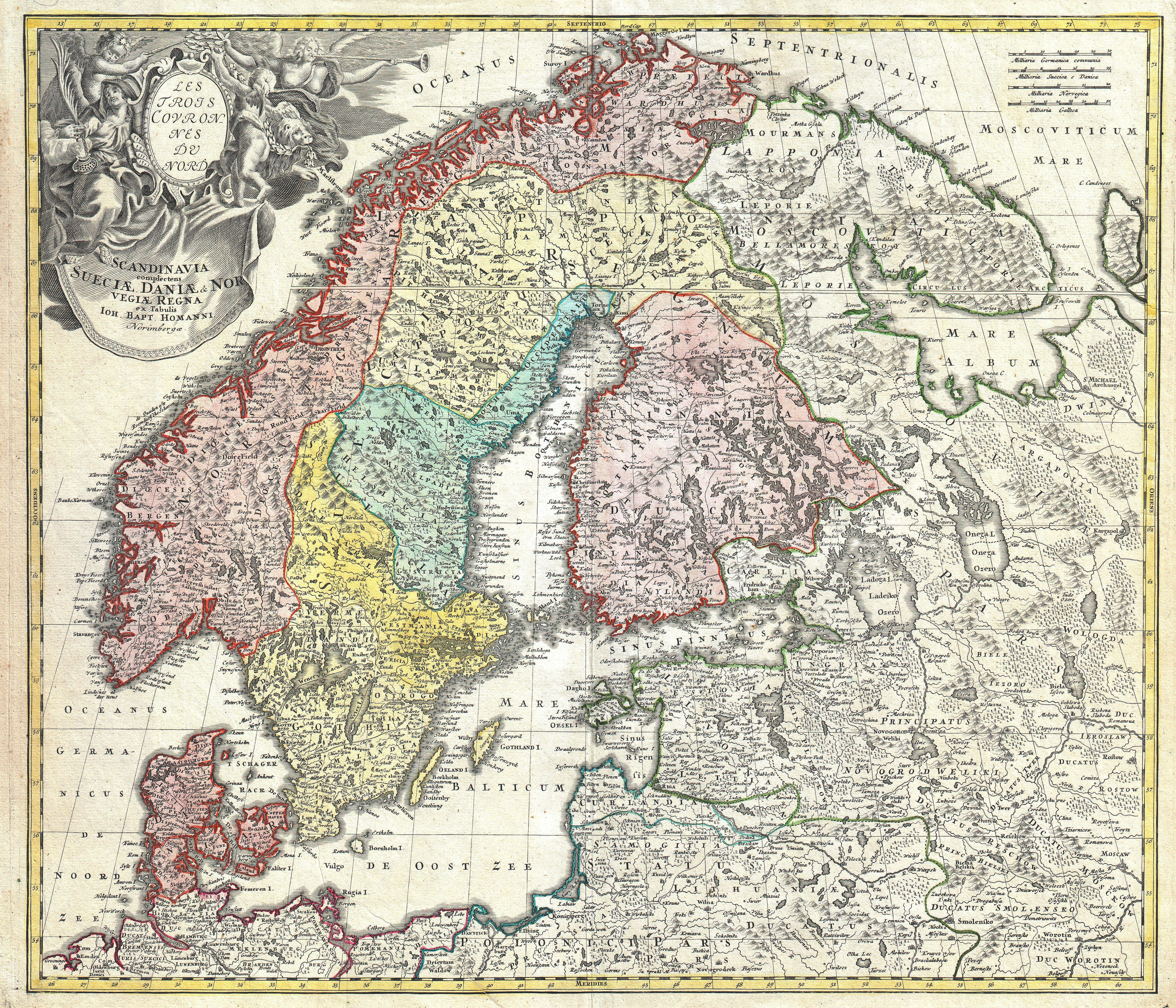
Homann Map of Scandinavia, Norway, Sweden, Denmark, Finland and the Baltics, dated around 1730.

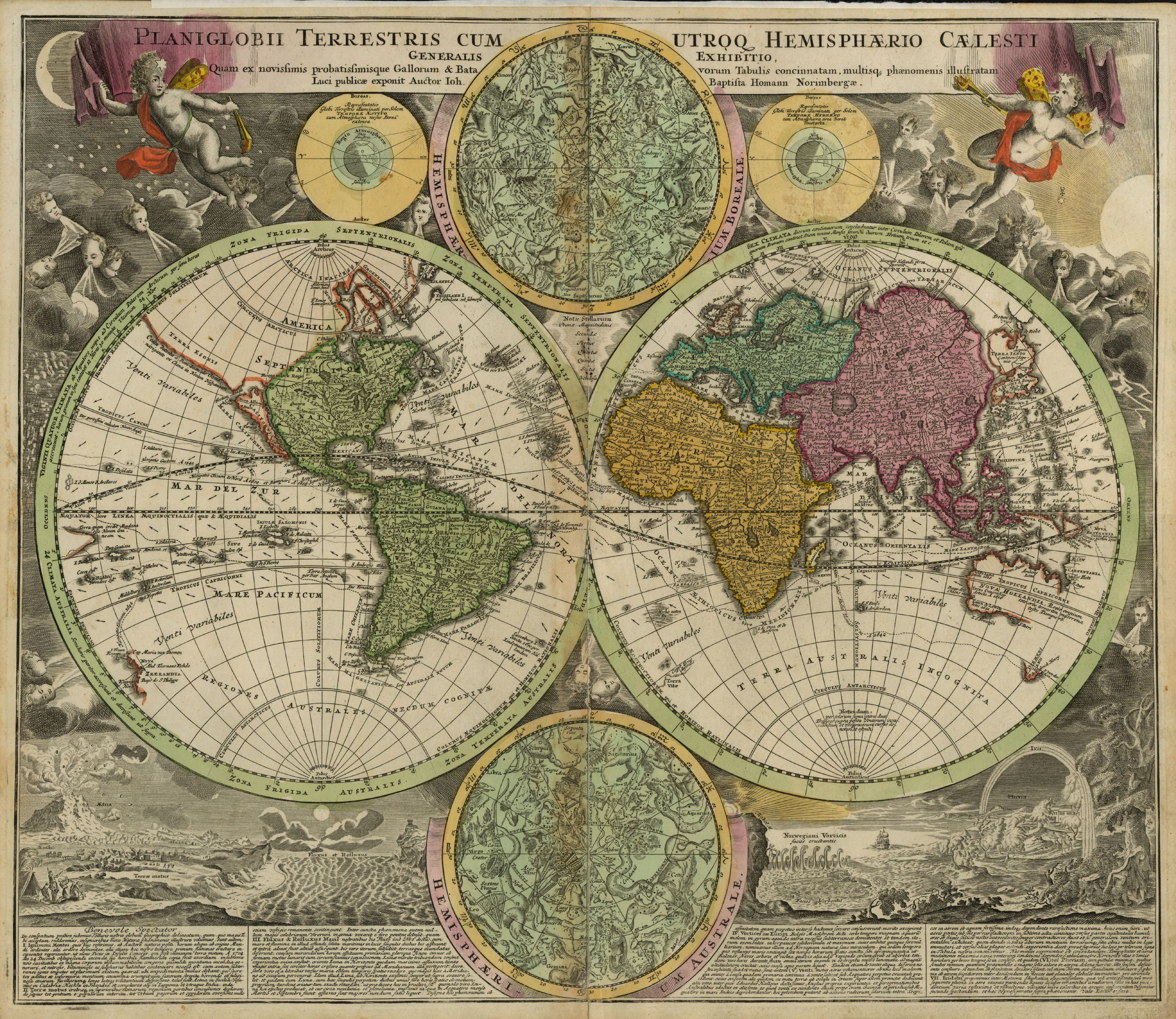
Planiglobii Terrestris Cum Utroq[ue] Hemisphærio Cælesti Generalis Exhibitio, Nürnberg, 1707.

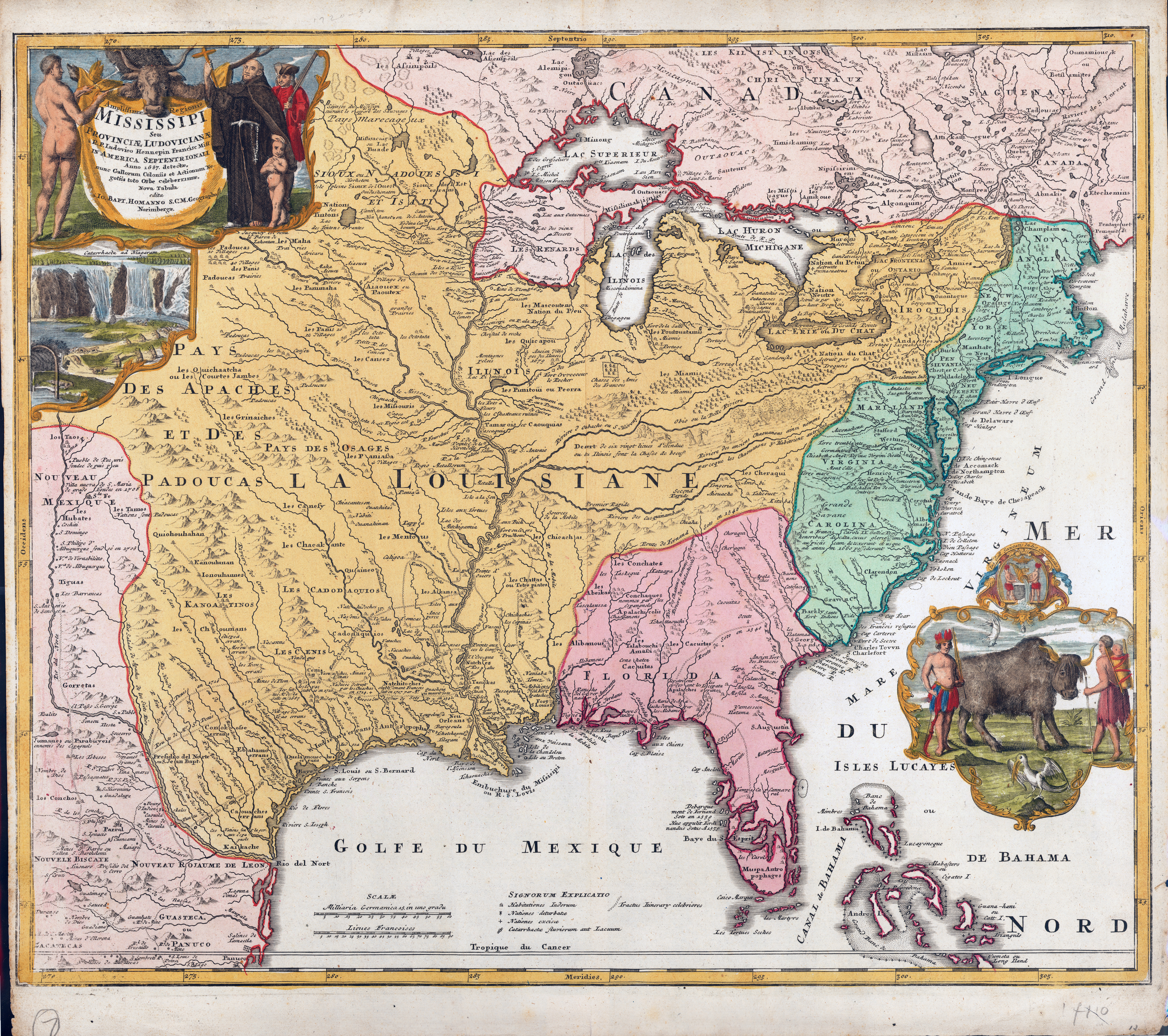
Amplissimae Regionis Mississipi, circa 1720

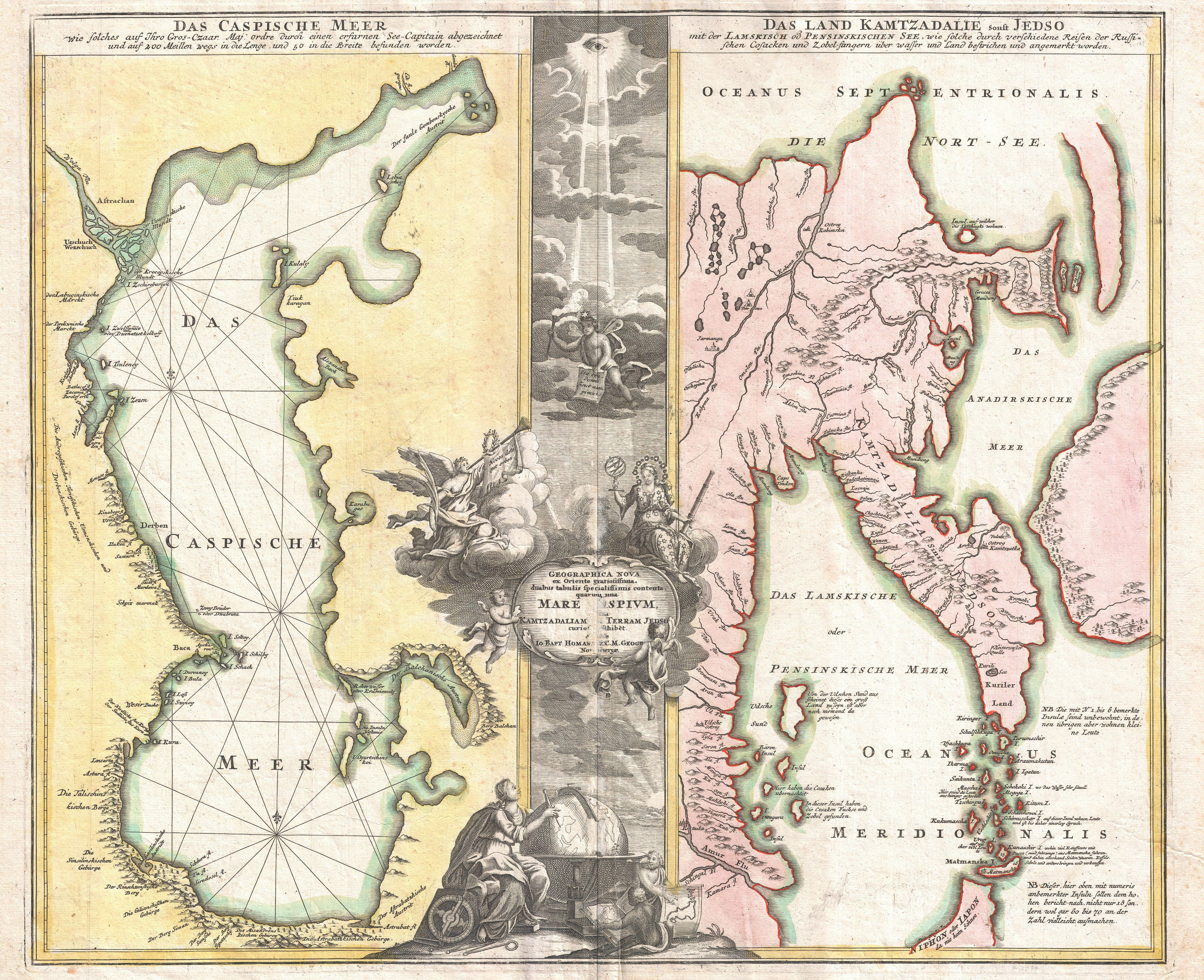
Homann Map of the Caspian Sea and Kamchatka, from 1725.

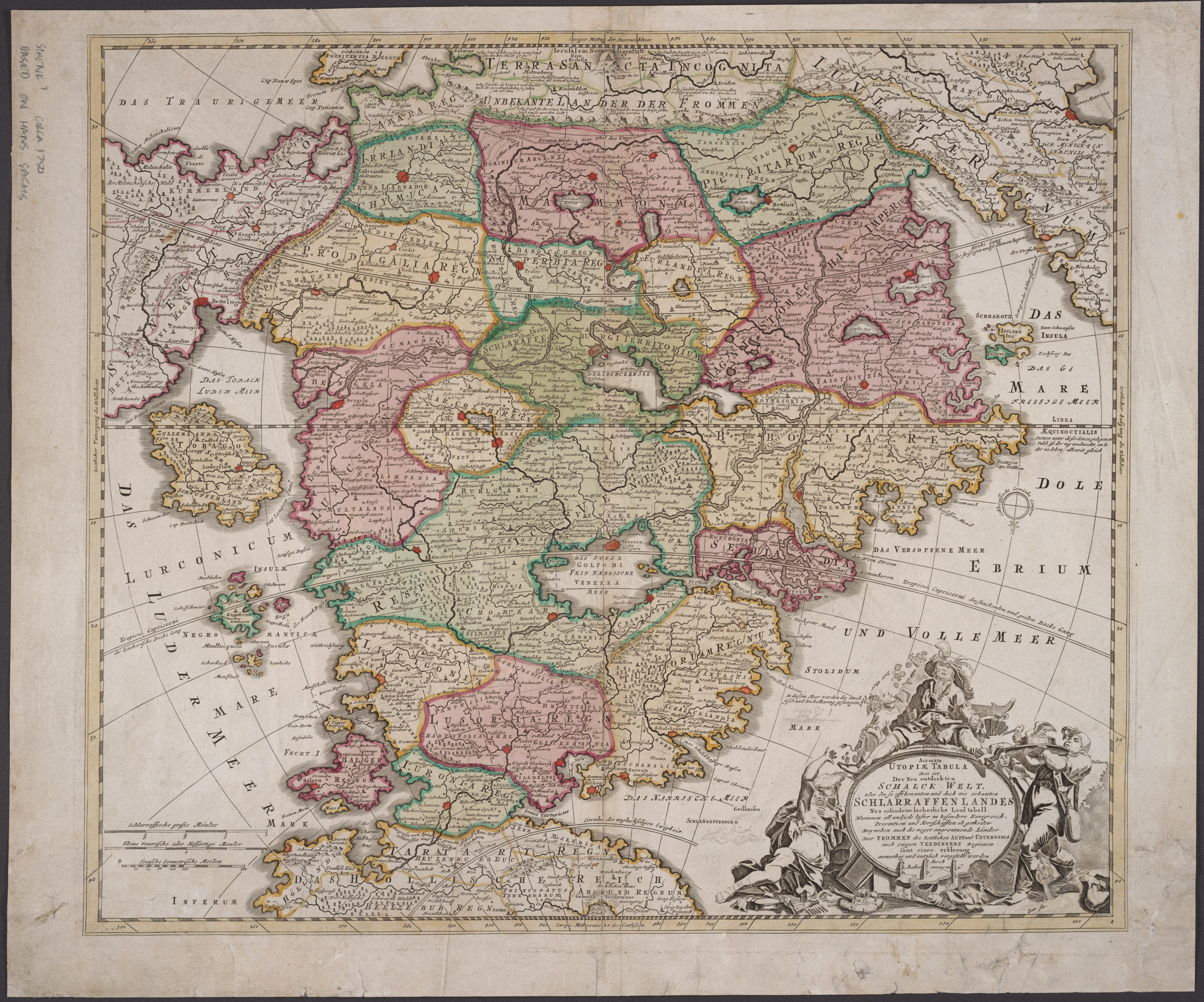
Schlarraffenlandes, 1694.

== Sources ==
- Auserlesene und allerneueste Landkarten: der Verlag Homann in Nürnberg 1702–1848: eine Ausstellung des Stadtarchivs Nürnberg und der Museen der Stadt Nürnberg mit Unterstützung der Staatsbibliothek zu Berlin-Preussischer Kulturbesitz im Stadtmuseum Fembohaus vom 19. September bis 24. November 2002. Hrsg. von Michael Diefenbacher, Markus Heinz und Ruth Bach-Damaskinos. Nürnberg: Tümmels, 2002. (Ausstellungskatalog des Stadtarchivs Nürnberg, Nr. 14). ISBN 3-925002-84-7
- Christian Sandler (1886, 1890, 1905, Reprints 2001–2002) (biography section considered outdated)
