= Matthäus Seutter =

German map publisher (1678–1757)

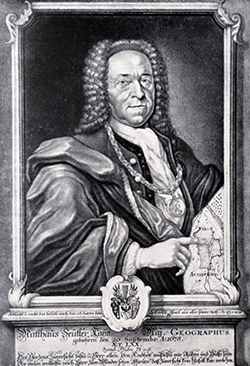
Matthäus Seutter

Matthäus Seutter (20 September 1678 Augsburg – March 1757 in Augsburg) was a German map publisher of the 18th century.

== Biography ==
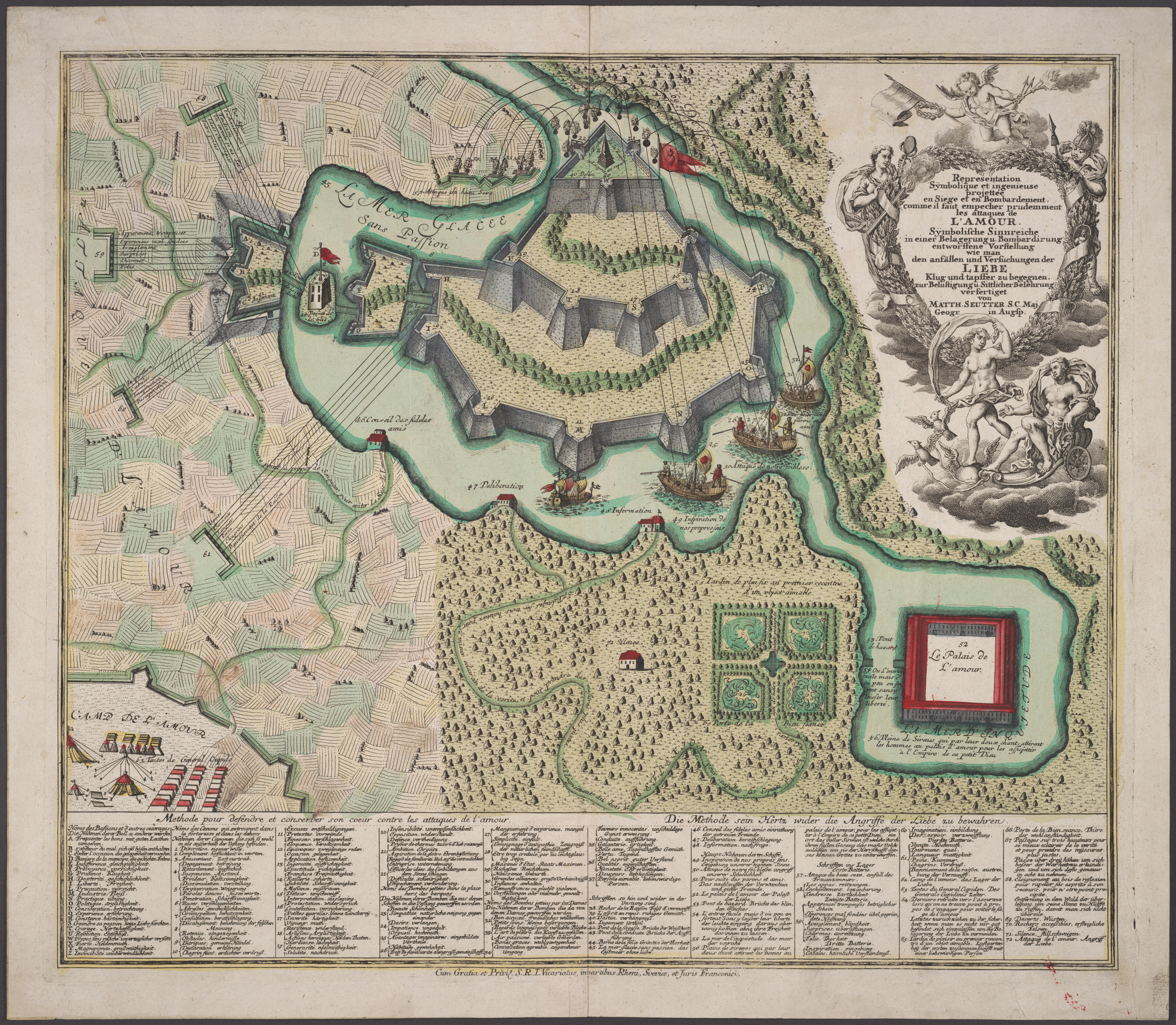
The Attack of Love, Matthäus Seutter, 1730

Seutter started his career as an apprentice brewer. Apparently uninspired by the beer business, Seutter left his apprenticeship and moved to Nuremberg, where he apprenticed as an engraver under the tutelage of the prominent Johann Homann. Sometime in the early 18th century, Seutter left Homann to establish his own independent cartographic publishing firm in Augsburg. Although he struggled in the early years of his independent work, Seutter's engraving skill and commitment to diversified map production eventually gained him a substantial following. Most of Seutter's maps were heavily based on, if not copies of, earlier work by the Homann and Delisle firms.

By 1732 Seutter was honored with the title of "imperial geographer" by German Emperor Charles VI. Seutter continued to publish until his death, at the height of his career, in 1757. The Seutter firm continued under Seutter's son Albrecht Carl until his death in 1762. Following Albrecht's death, the firm was divided between the established Probst firm and the emerging firm of Tobias Conrad Lotter. Lotter, Matthäus Seutter's son-in-law, was a master engraver and worked on behalf of the Seutter firm. Lotter eventually became one of the most prominent cartographers of his day.
