= Fantasy cartography =

Study and creation of maps of imagined places or events

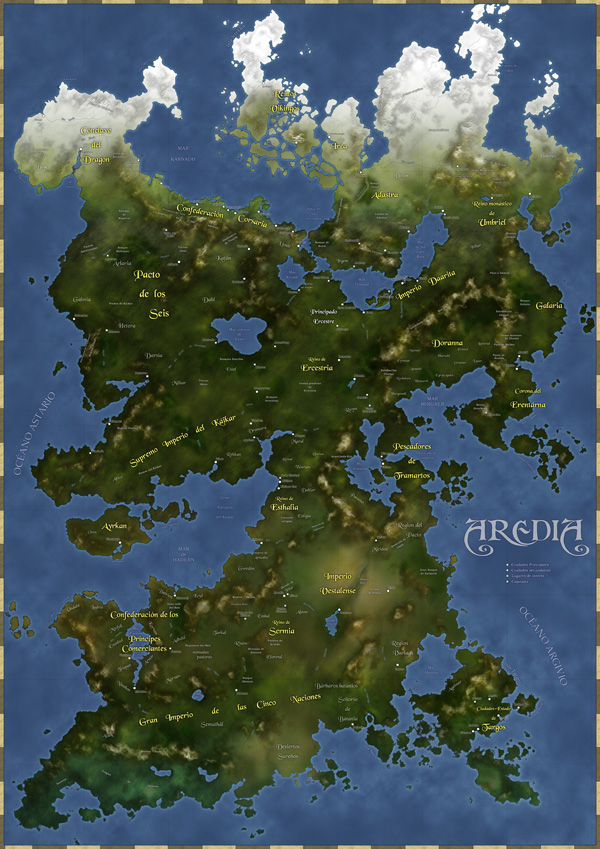
A map of the fictional kingdom of Aredia, which is a generic campaign setting used in role-playing games

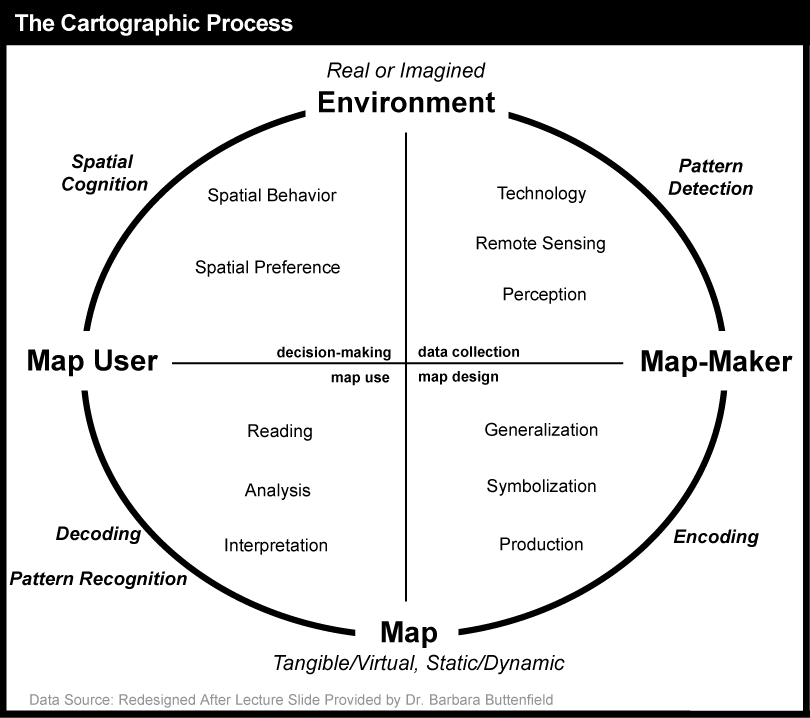
A visualization of the cartographic process

A map of the fictional Island of Sodor from The Railway Series by Rev. W. Awdry

Fantasy cartography, fictional map-making, or geofiction is a type of map design that visually presents an imaginary world or concept, or represents a real-world geography in a fantastic style. Fantasy cartography usually manifests from worldbuilding and often corresponds to narratives within the fantasy and science fiction genres. Stefan Ekman says, "a [regular] map re-presents what is already there; a fictional map is often primary – to create the map means, largely, to create the world of the map."

Whilst cartographic fantasy has been popularized by novels of these genres, it has also become a standalone hobby and artistic pursuit. Cartographic fantasy has its historic origins in mythology, philosophy, literature and natural sciences. Although typically geographical, cartographic fantasy can include planetary, galactic, and cosmological maps; conceptual maps; and speculative maps. Fantasy maps are created and presented across different media such as books, television shows, movies, video games, tabletop games, and websites; and are characterized by aesthetics, themes and styles associated with the world or concept they are portraying. The increased popularity of geofiction and worldbuilding has led to and been supported by the emergence of design programs tailored to creative cartographers.

== History ==
=== Early history ===
The roots of the history of fantasy cartography are shared with the independent histories of both cartography and fantasy as well as the general history of the visualization of ideas.

=== Middle ages ===
Cartographers of the Middle Ages did not see their profession as purely making accurate representations of geography. Often their maps were crafted as much as works of art as tools for navigating, incorporating imagery and symbolism from mythology, folklore and fantasy stories.

An early example of cartography created without intending to present a geographical reality is Dante's Hell. By the late fifteenth century, numerous illustrations inspired by Dante Alighieri's Divine Comedy had been published based on descriptions from the text. Dante's Hell has continued to be the subject of fantasy cartographers for centuries.

In 1516, Thomas More published his Utopia accompanied by a map of the island. This map inspired artistic cartographers over the sixteenth century to iterate the original.

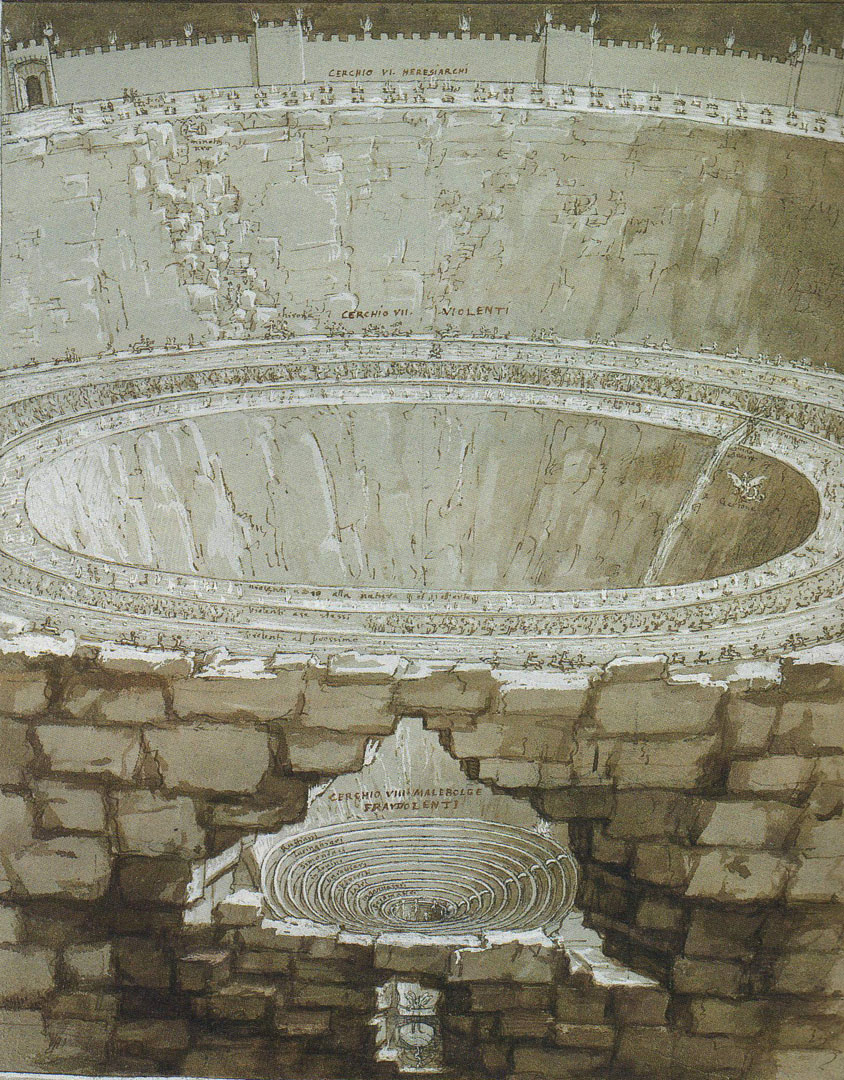
Stradanus' Map of Dante's Lower Inferno

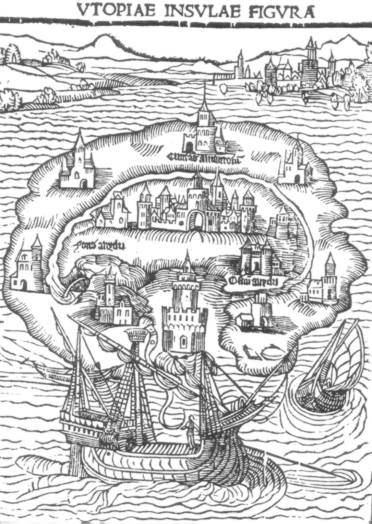
The Island of More's Utopia

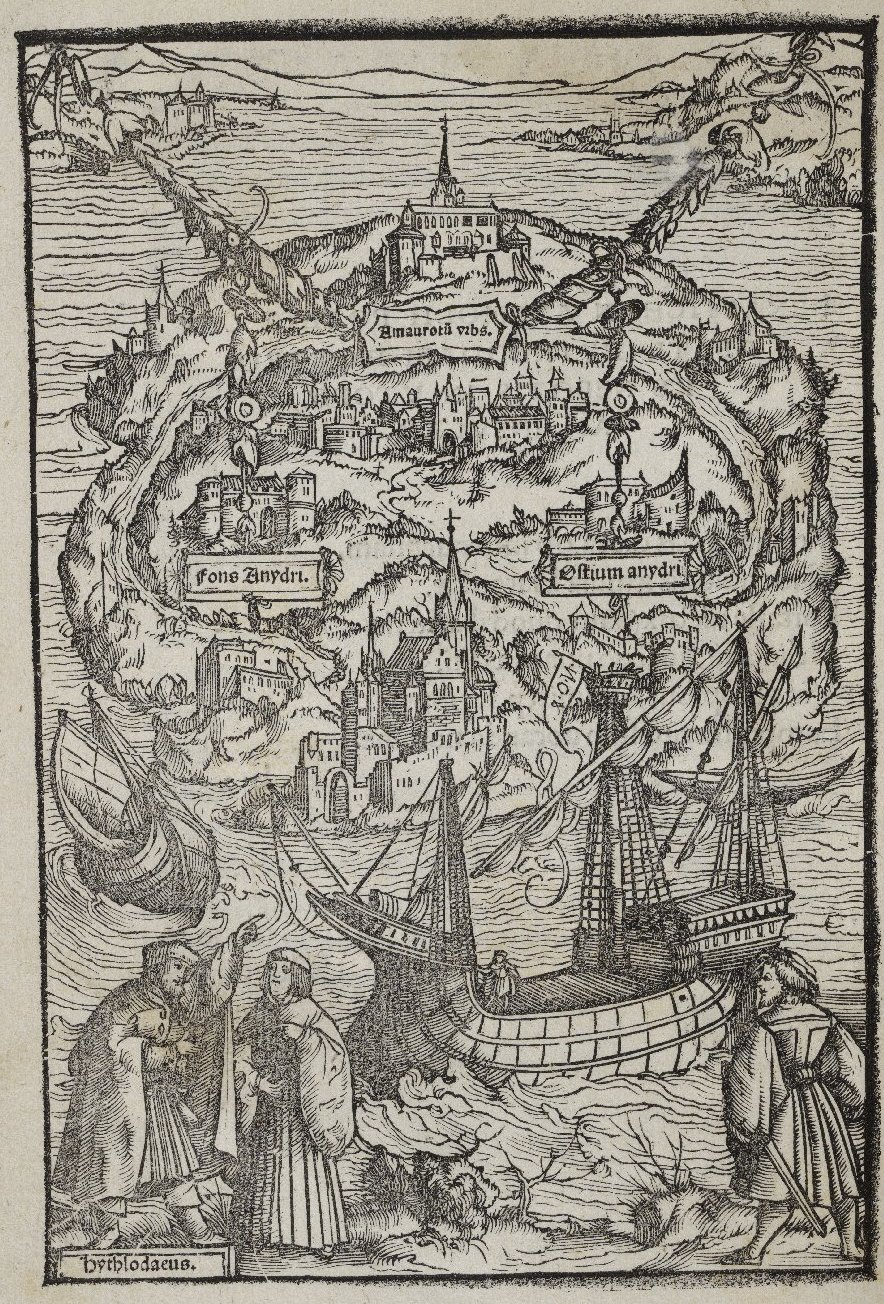
Ambrosius Holbein's woodcut print Map of Utopia

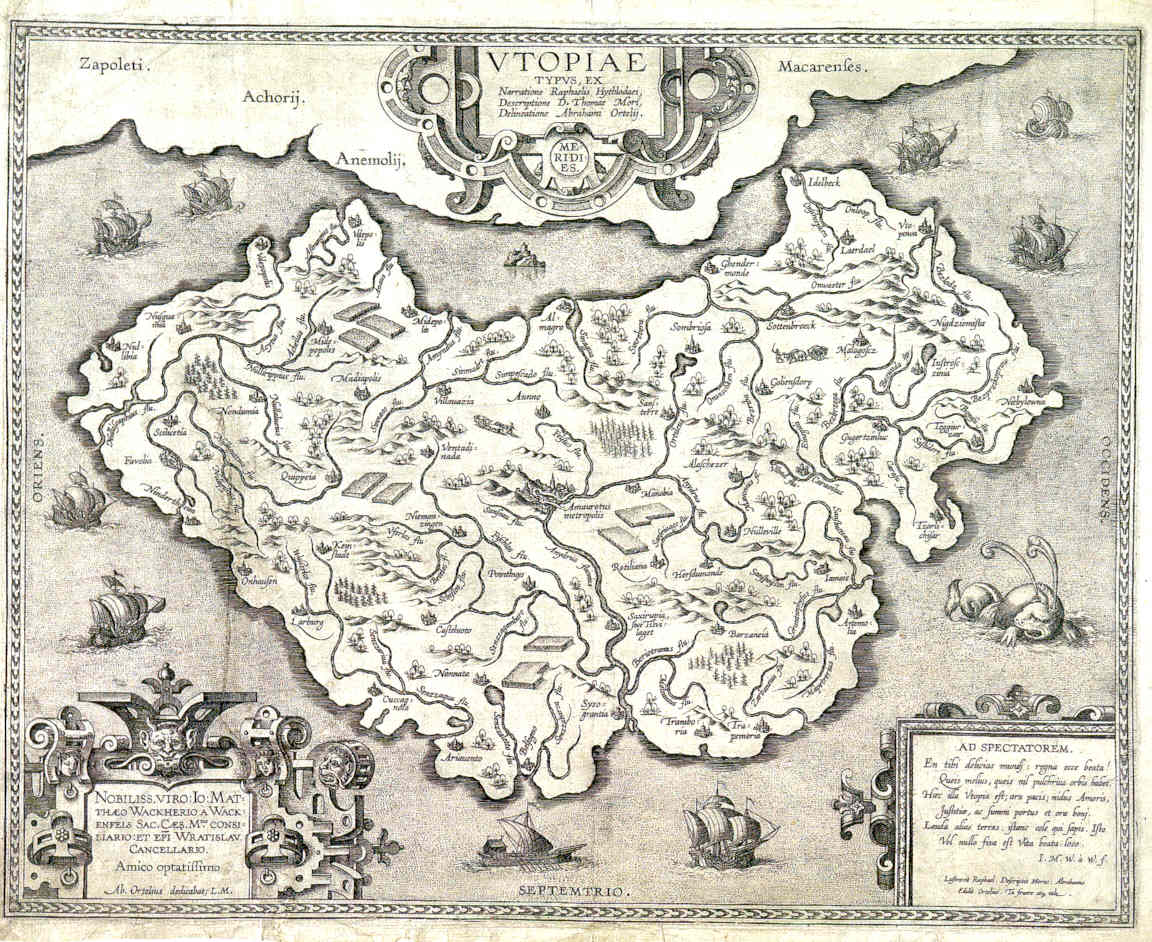
Abraham Ortelius's map of More's Utopia

Examples of Fantasy Maps from the Middle Ages

=== Enlightenment and discovery ===
In the latter half of the 16th century the Bible began to be printed with internal maps as a product of the Protestant movement and the Geneva reforms. This may have contributed to the increased popularity of text-accompanying maps and stirred the public imagination towards producing maps for fiction.

Fiction inspired by the Age of Discovery and the Age of Enlightenment also brought with it a romanticization of explorative cartography and surveying. Several classic stories from the era included maps as an important element of the reader's experience. Among the most popular of these map-accompanied fictional texts from the time are Jonathan Swift's Gulliver's Travels (1726) and Robert Louis Stevenson's Treasure Island (1883).

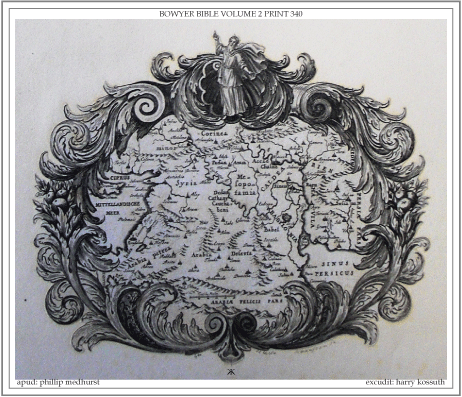
'Map of the Bible Lands' from Volume 2 of the Bowyer Bible

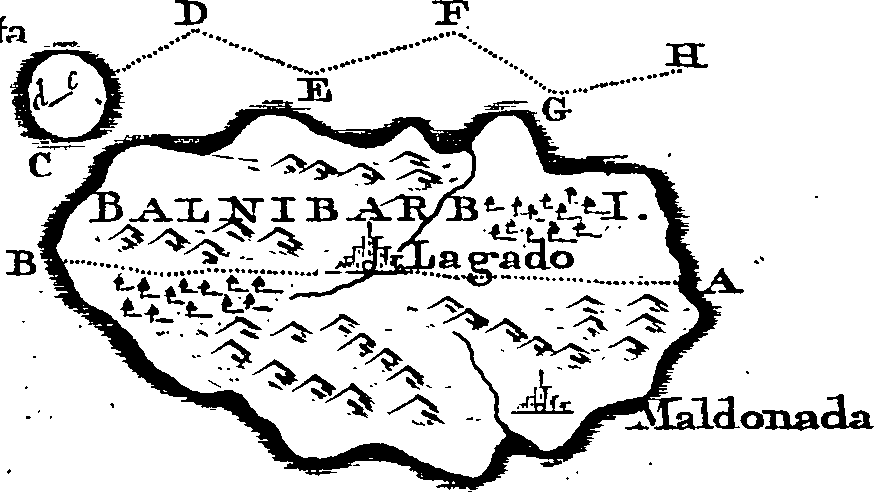
The Island Laputa from Dr. Jonathan Swift's Gulliver's Travels

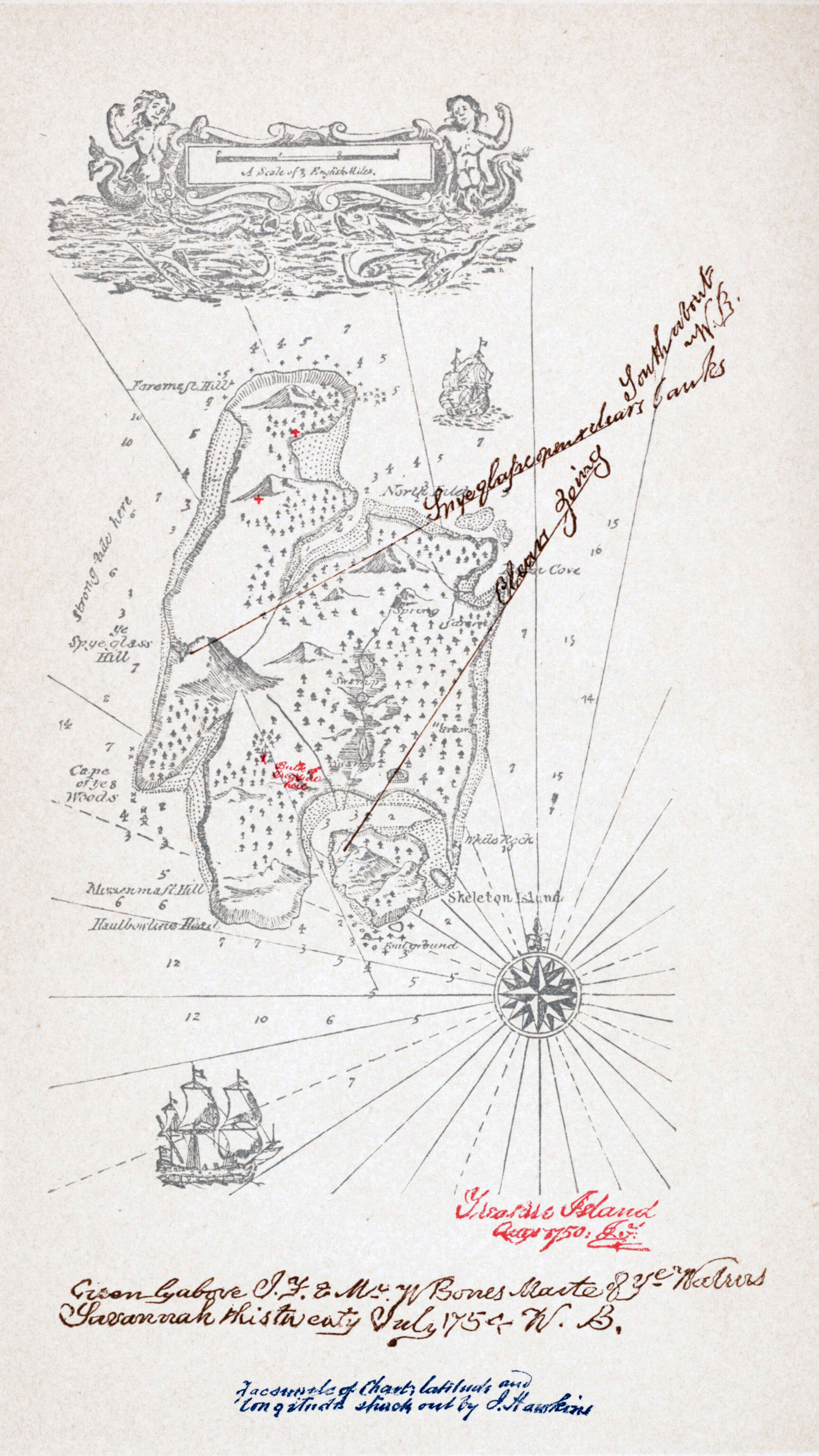
A Map of Robert Louis Stevenson's Treasure Island

John Bunyan's The Pilgrim's Progress (1678) included both "A Mapp Shewing the Order & Causes of Salvation and Damnation" and "The Road from the City of Destruction to the Eternal City."

=== Modern history ===
The most influential fantasy cartographer is J. R. R. Tolkien, whose maps of Middle-earth prefacing The Lord of the Rings have been called "the most influential example to date," one that "encouraged other writers and their publishers to include cartographic images." In his book Here Be Dragons: Exploring Fantasy Maps and Settings, Ekman says, "In modern fantasy, especially high fantasy, maps are considered common enough to be almost obligatory, mainly because of the maps J. R. R. Tolkien included in The Lord of the Rings (1954–55)."

Before Tolkien, another text that brought fantastic worlds into the zeitgeist was The Wonderful Wizard of Oz (1900) written by L. Frank Baum and the corresponding 1939 musical fantasy film The Wizard of Oz. The world of Oz was mapped by Baum in 1914.

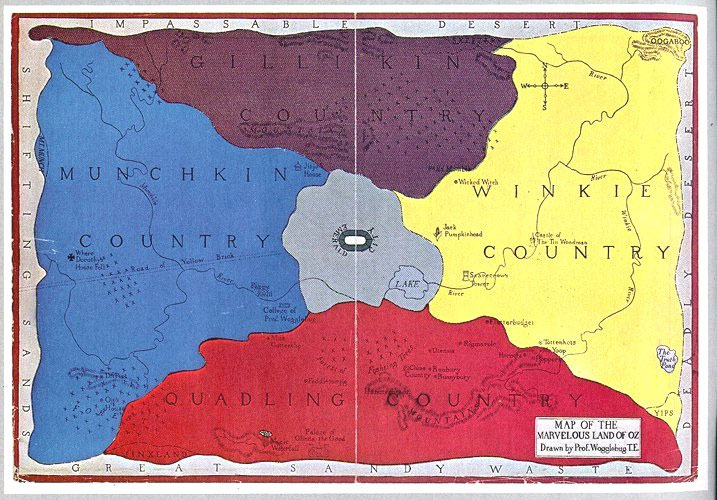
The Map of Oz

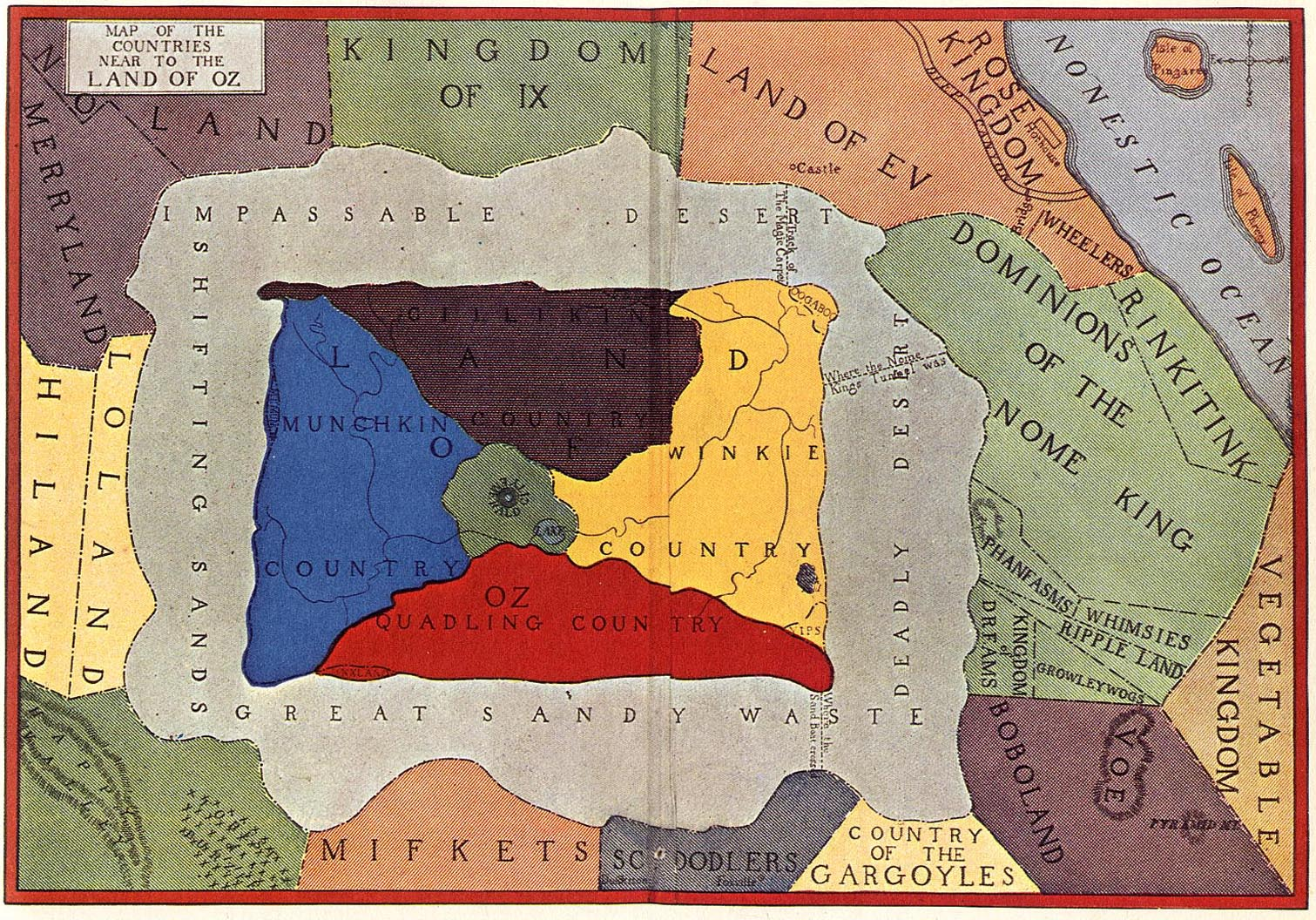
Map of Oz and the countries surrounding it across the deserts (Note: East and West are reversed)

== Types ==
There are many types of maps within cartographic fantasy which can be classified by genre, scope and purpose.

=== Genre ===
Fantasy maps can be categorized based on genre. These genre classifications inform what kind of aesthetic, style and scope the map presents.

==== Fantasy ====
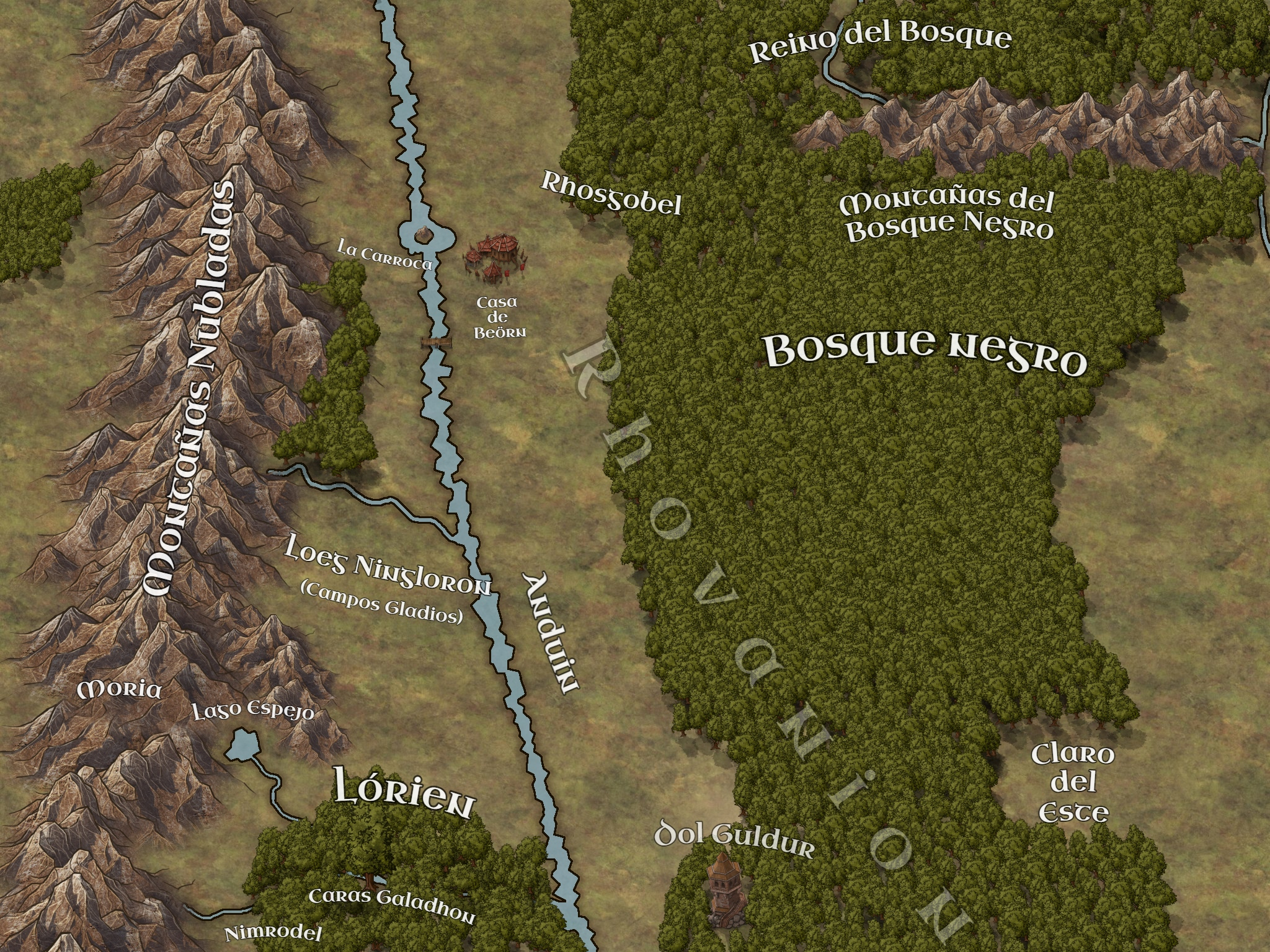
A map of the Middle-earth region Rhovanion

Fantasy is a genre of speculative fiction involving magical elements, typically set in a fictional universe and sometimes inspired by mythology and folklore. Fantasy is distinguished from the genres of science fiction and horror by the respective absence of scientific or macabre themes, although these genres can overlap. In popular culture, the fantasy genre predominantly features maps and settings that emulate Earth, but with a sense of otherness. Maps created in this genre reflect these concepts.

==== Science fiction ====
Science fiction is a genre of speculative fiction that typically deals with imaginative and futuristic concepts such as advanced science and technology, space exploration, time travel, parallel universes, and extraterrestrial life. It has been called the "literature of ideas", and it often explores the potential consequences of scientific, social, and technological innovations. Maps created in this genre reflect these concepts.

==== Sub-genres ====
Under the genre umbrellas of Fantasy and Science fiction exist many subgenres. Included here are brief introductions to the subgenres that more often exhibit maps.

===== Fantasy subgenres =====
====== High fantasy ======
High fantasy, or epic fantasy, is a subgenre of fantasy defined by the epic nature of its setting or by the epic stature of its characters, themes or plot.

====== Historical fantasy ======
Historical fantasy is a subgenre of fantasy and genre of historical fiction that incorporates fantastic elements (such as magic) into a more "realistic" or historical narrative. There is much crossover with other subgenres of fantasy; those classed as Arthurian, Celtic, or Dark Ages could just as easily be placed in historical fantasy. Stories fitting this classification generally take place prior to the 20th century.

====== Heroic fantasy ======
Heroic fantasy is a subgenre of fantasy in which events occur in a world where magic is prevalent and modern technology is non-existent. The setting may be entirely fictitious in nature or based upon earth with some additions. Unlike dark fiction, it provides a setting in which "all men are strong, all women beautiful, all life adventurous, and all problems simple". This means that adventures based in heroic fantasy are unlikely to mention any wider problems that cannot be fixed by a quest.

===== Science fiction subgenres =====
====== Steampunk ======
Steampunk is a subgenre of science fiction that incorporates retrofuturistic technology and aesthetics inspired by 19th-century industrial steam-powered machinery. Steampunk works are often set in an alternative history of the Victorian era or the American "Wild West", where steam power remains in mainstream use, or in a fantasy world that similarly employs steam power.

====== Cyberpunk ======
Cyberpunk is a subgenre of science fiction in a dystopian futuristic setting that tends to focus on a "combination of lowlife and high tech", featuring futuristic technological and scientific achievements, such as artificial intelligence and cybernetics, juxtaposed with societal collapse or decay.

====== Apocalyptic and post-apocalyptic fiction ======
Apocalyptic and post-apocalyptic fiction is a subgenre of science fiction among others, in which the Earth's (or another planet's) civilization is collapsing or has collapsed. The apocalypse event may be climatic, such as runaway climate change; astronomical, such as an impact event; destructive, such as nuclear holocaust or resource depletion; medical, such as a pandemic, whether natural or human-caused; end time, such as the Last Judgment, Second Coming or Ragnarök; or more imaginative, such as a zombie apocalypse, cybernetic revolt, technological singularity, dysgenics or alien invasion.

=== Scope ===
Fantasy maps can be categorized based on scope. Scope informs how, and how much, information is displayed in the map.

- Local (City and town maps)
  A Map of Alexandria, 1575
- Geographical
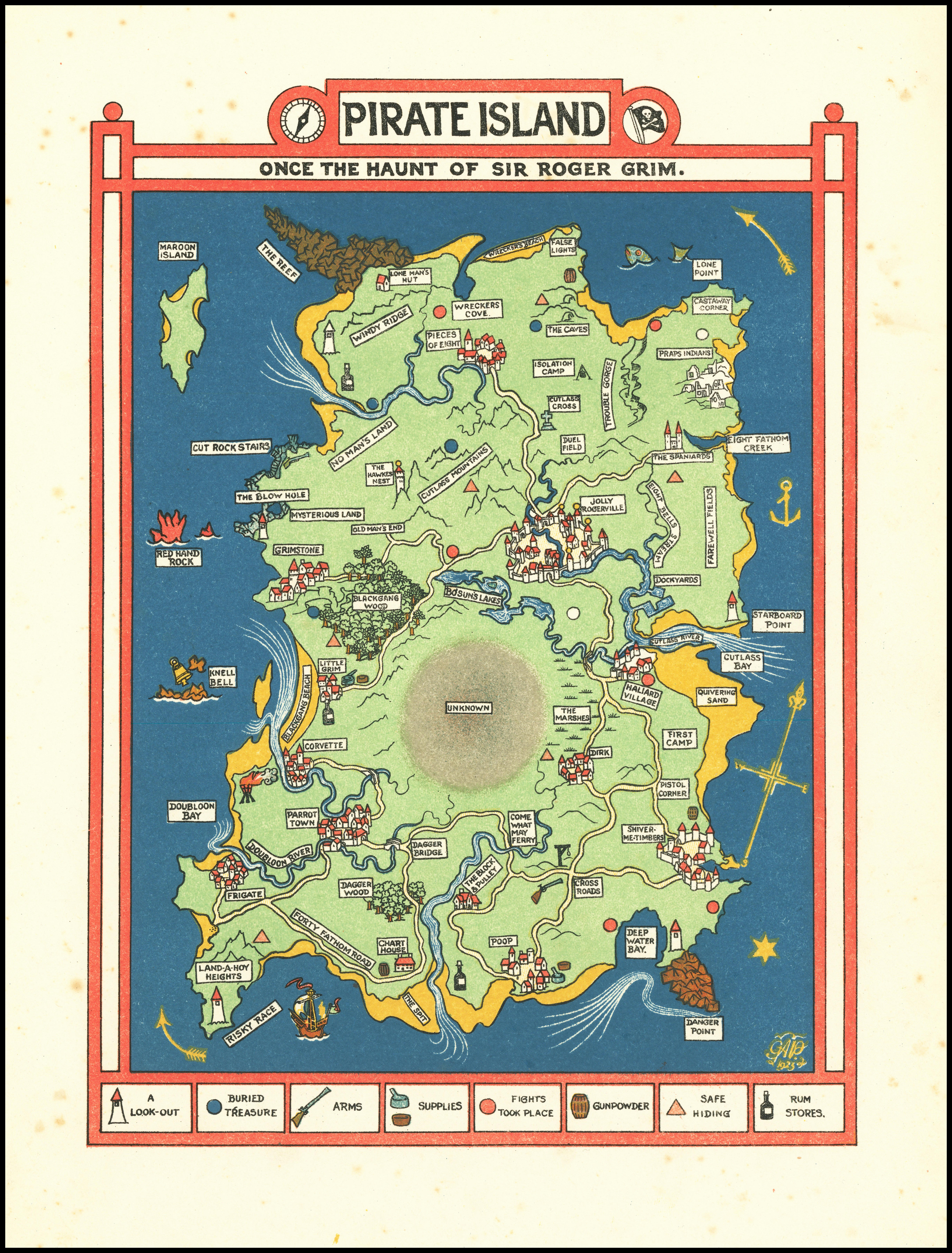
  Color-lithographed fantasy map of "Pirate Island" by Gilbert Anthony Pownall, published in London in 1924
- Planetary
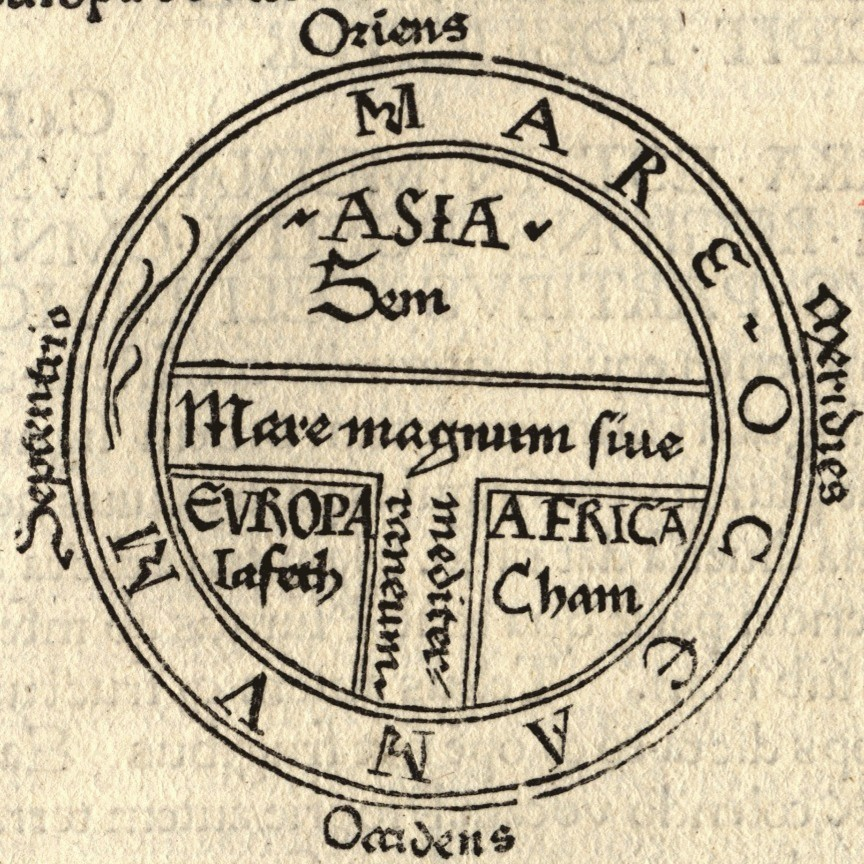
  T and O style mappa mundi (map of the known world) from the first printed version of Isidorus's Etymologiae
- Galactic
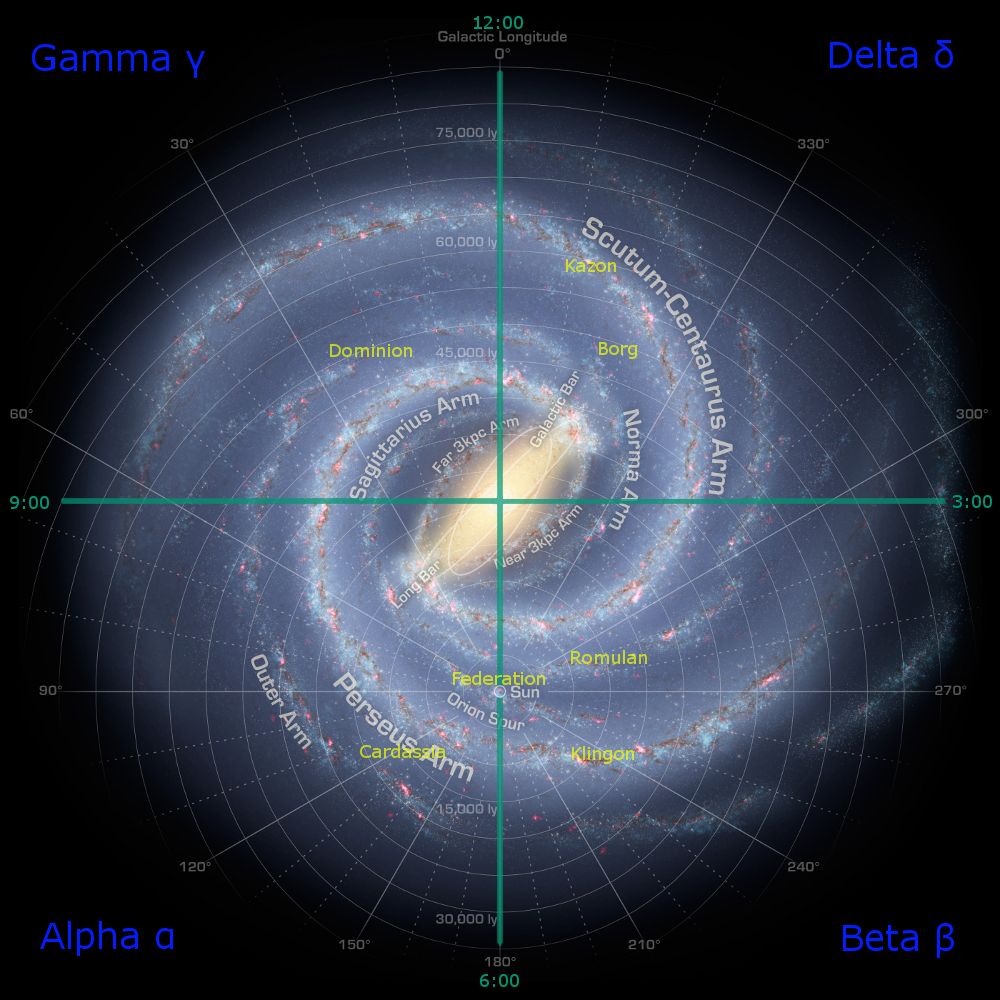
  Galactic Quadrant Map from Star Trek
- Cosmological
  Celestial Map of Ptolemy's Universe

=== Purpose ===
Fantasy maps can be categorized based on intended purpose. These classifications reflect the creator's aim and inform the way the map is crafted.

==== Conceptual or allegorical ====
Conceptual maps are cartographic visualizations of ideas and concepts. These maps do not attempt to correspond to anything physically real but are instead meant to display an idea in a cartographic medium. Matthaus Seutter's The Attack of Love is an example of a battle map used as an allegory for winning someone in love.

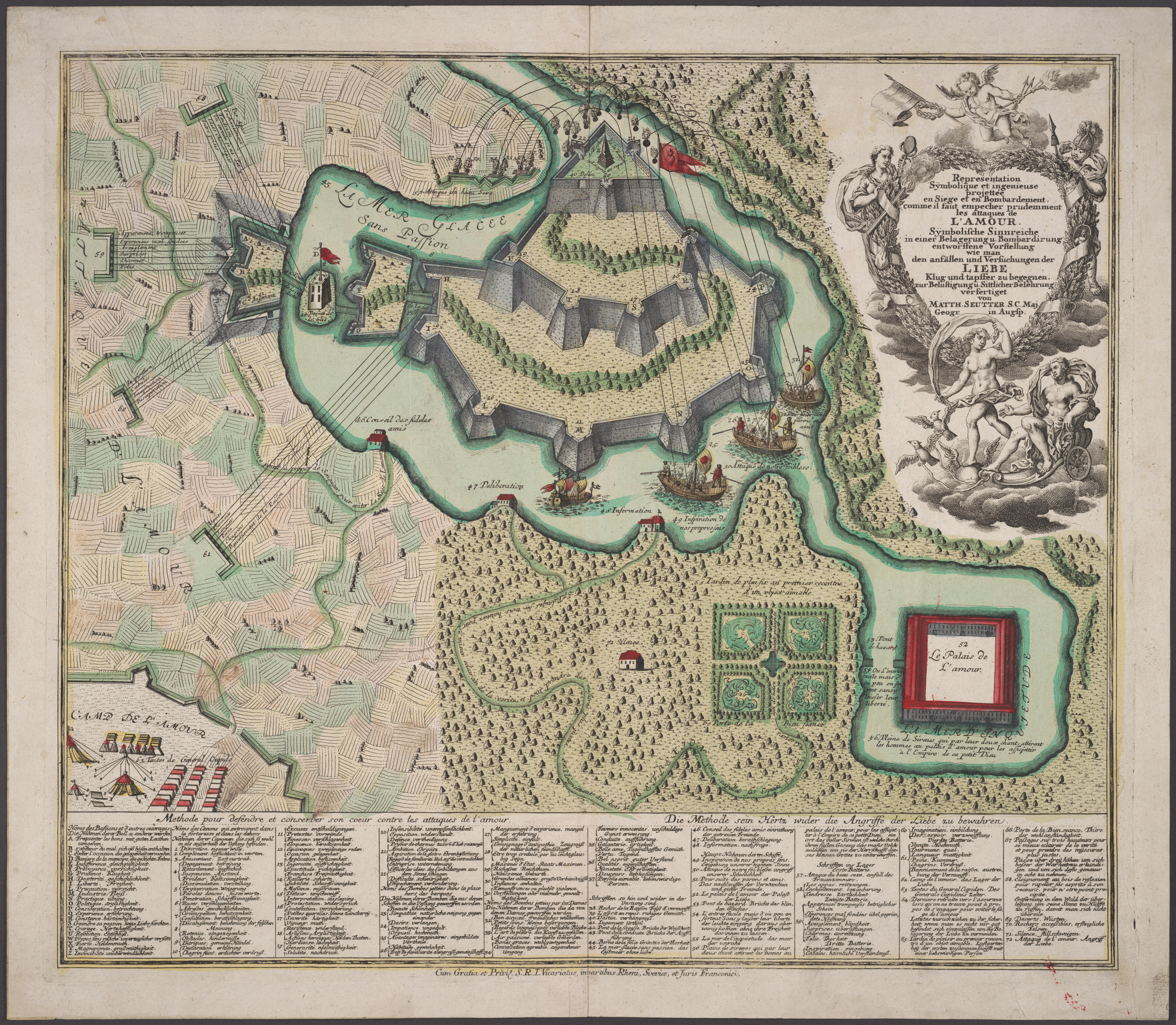
Matthaus Seutter's The Attack of Love

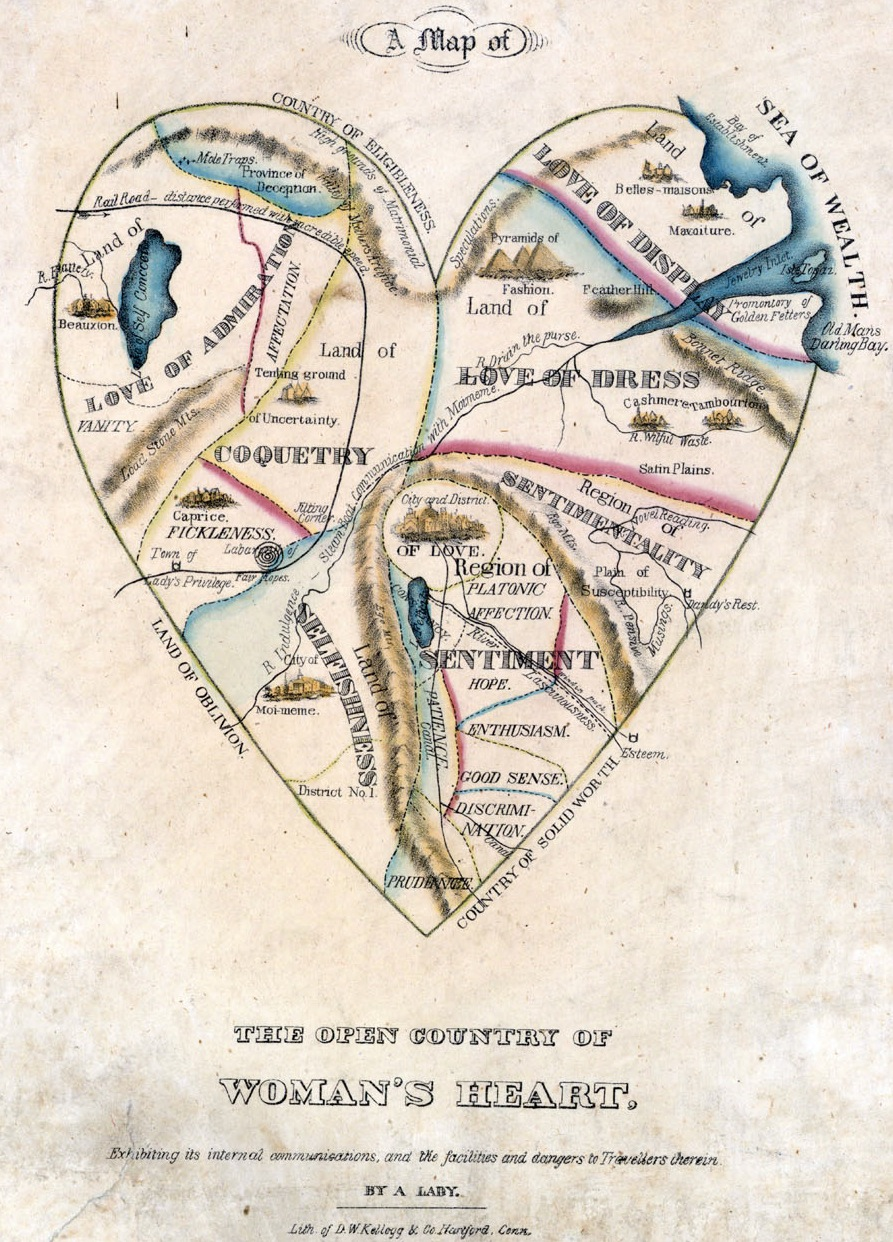
A Map of Woman's Heart

Ernest Dudley Chase's A Pictorial Map of Loveland

==== Hypothetical ====
Hypothetical maps are maps that present geography in alternate history scenarios. Melissa Gould created an alternate-history map of New York City in a hypothetical world where Nazi Germany won World War II.

==== Perspectival ====
Fantasy maps are often used by creators to convey a perspective. For this reason, they are depicted to be created by an in-world character or organisation. This is a useful tool for authors or worldbuilders as the map can act as a character within the story. They can be erroneous, time-specific or prejudiced much like a regular character or an unreliable narrator.

In the same way that creatives can use maps to convey perspective, mankind has done the same in history. Sebastian Munster's Europa Regina is a good example of this – a map design that presents Europe as a queen.

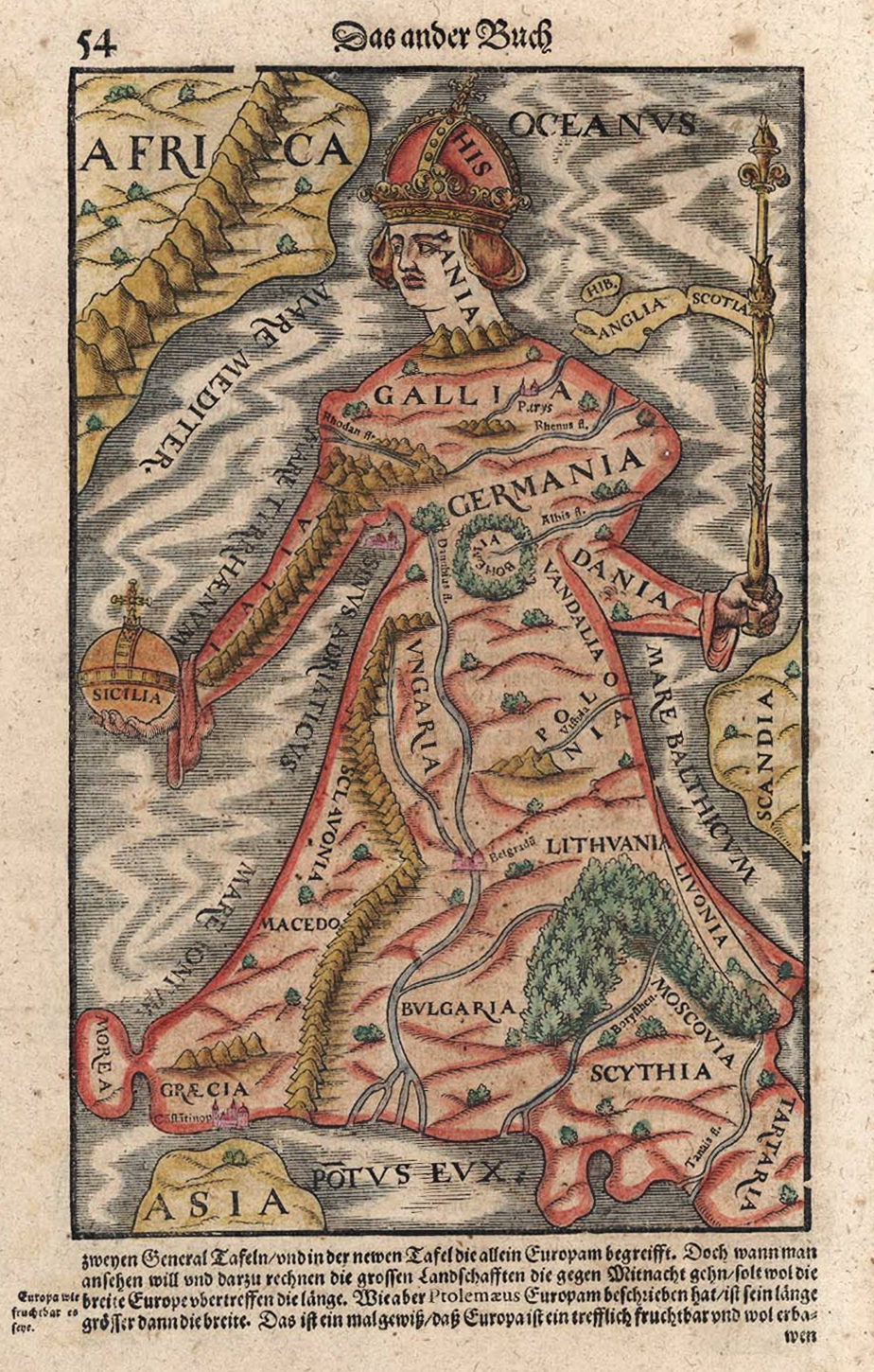
Map of Europe as a queen, printed by Sebastian Munster in Basel in 1570

==== Pedagogical or simulative ====
Fantasy maps can be used as cartographic aids to teach or simulate situations. In the Cold War, a U.S Army cryptologist Lambros D. Callimahos developed a training exercise war game for code-breakers simulating the invasion of Cuba. In this program the fantasy 'Republic of Zendia' was created with its northern and central province 'Loreno' mapped as cartographic references used in these exercises. These fantasy maps have now been declassified and released to the public domain by the U.S. Military.

A set of declassified fantasy maps used in training by U.S Army code-breakers in the Cold War

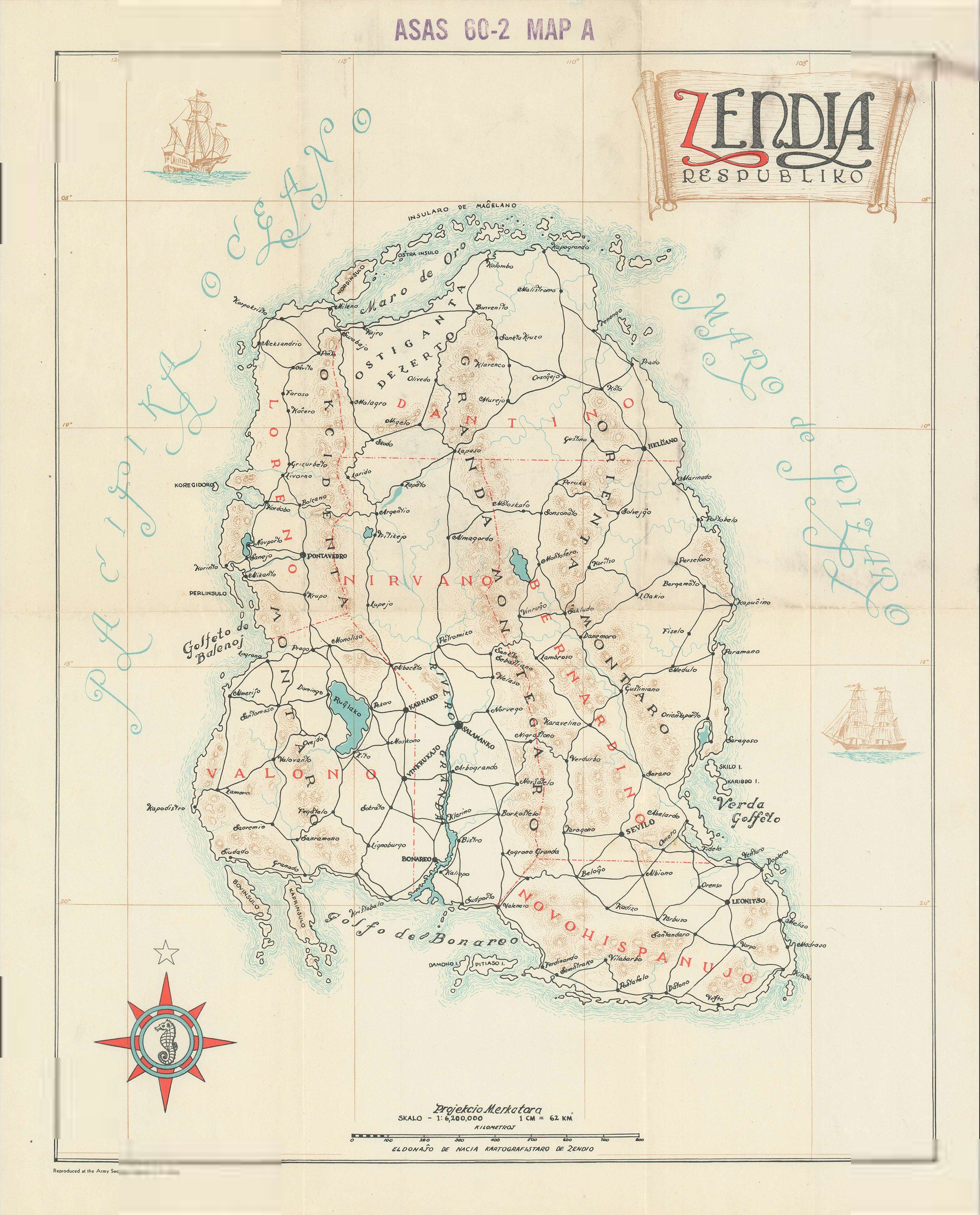
The Republic of Zendia

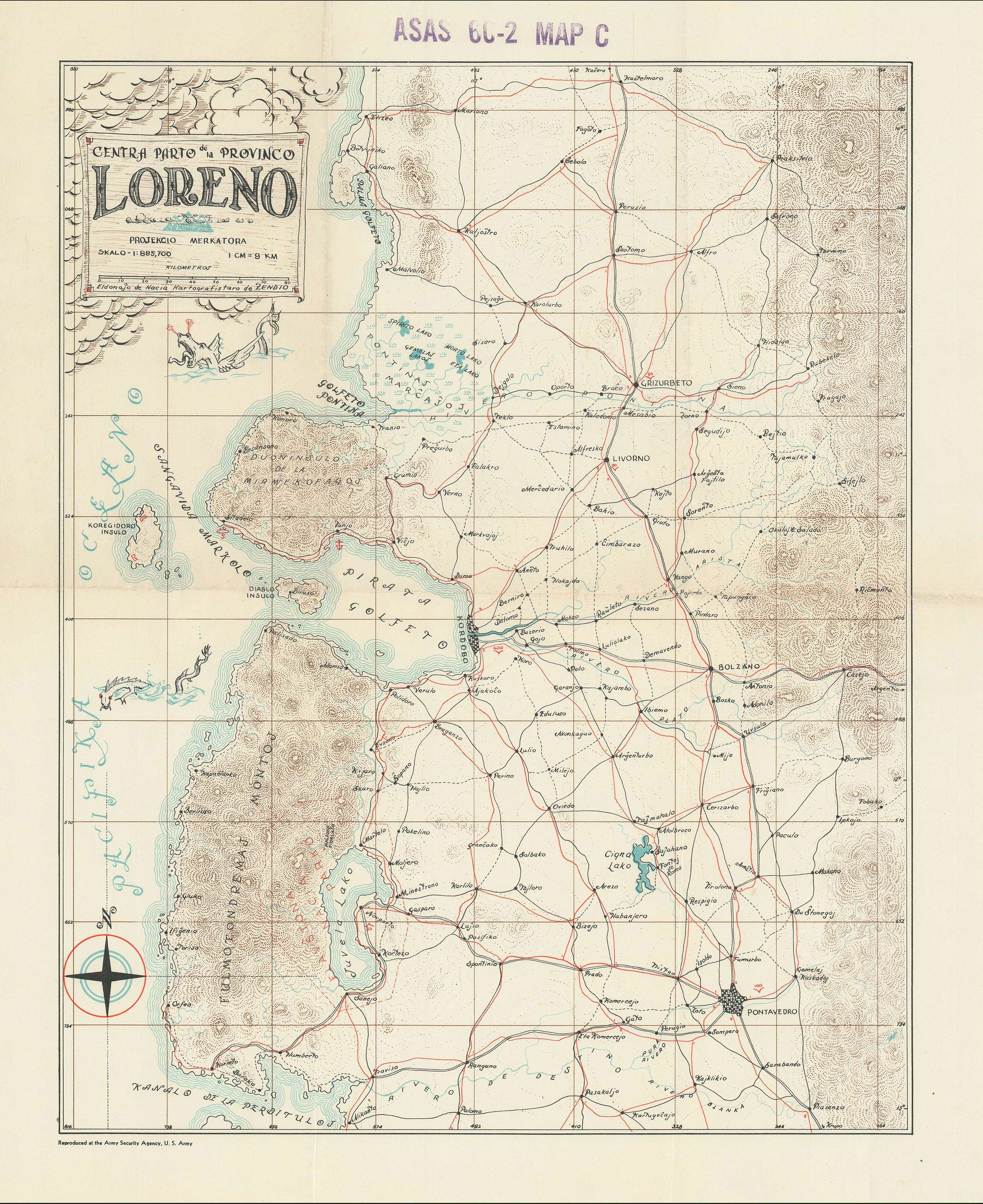
The Central Part of The Province of Loreno

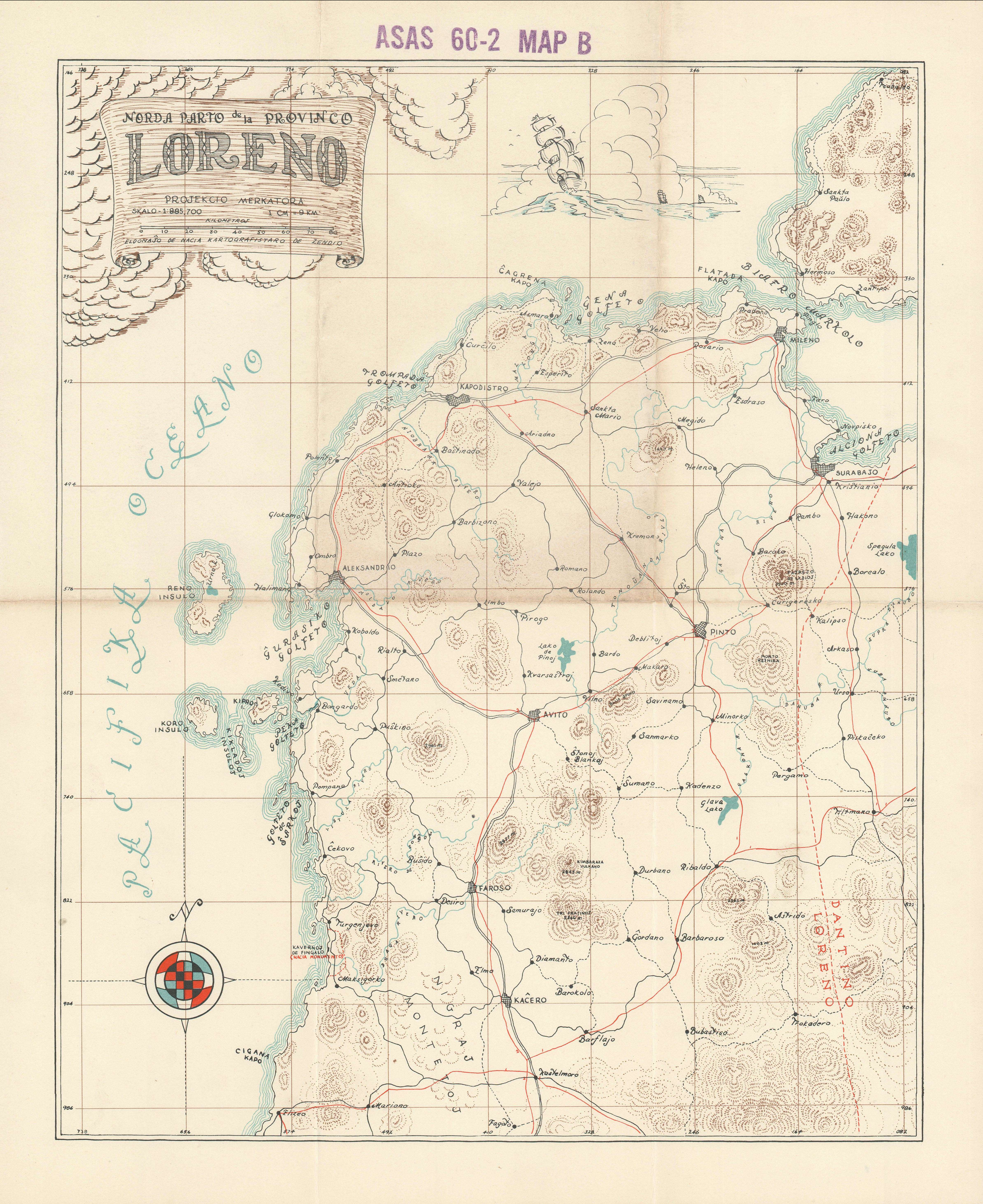
The Northern Part of The Province of Loreno

== Media and applications ==
Although popularized in novels, fantasy maps are now created and presented across various media such as television shows, movies, video games, and websites.

== Prevalence, features and characteristics ==
In his book Here Be Dragons: Exploring Fantasy Maps and Settings (2013), Stefan Ekman published the results of a survey he made of two-hundred fantasy books. This survey sought to answer common questions about the prevalence, features, and characteristics of fantasy cartography within the genre. Here are some of those findings.

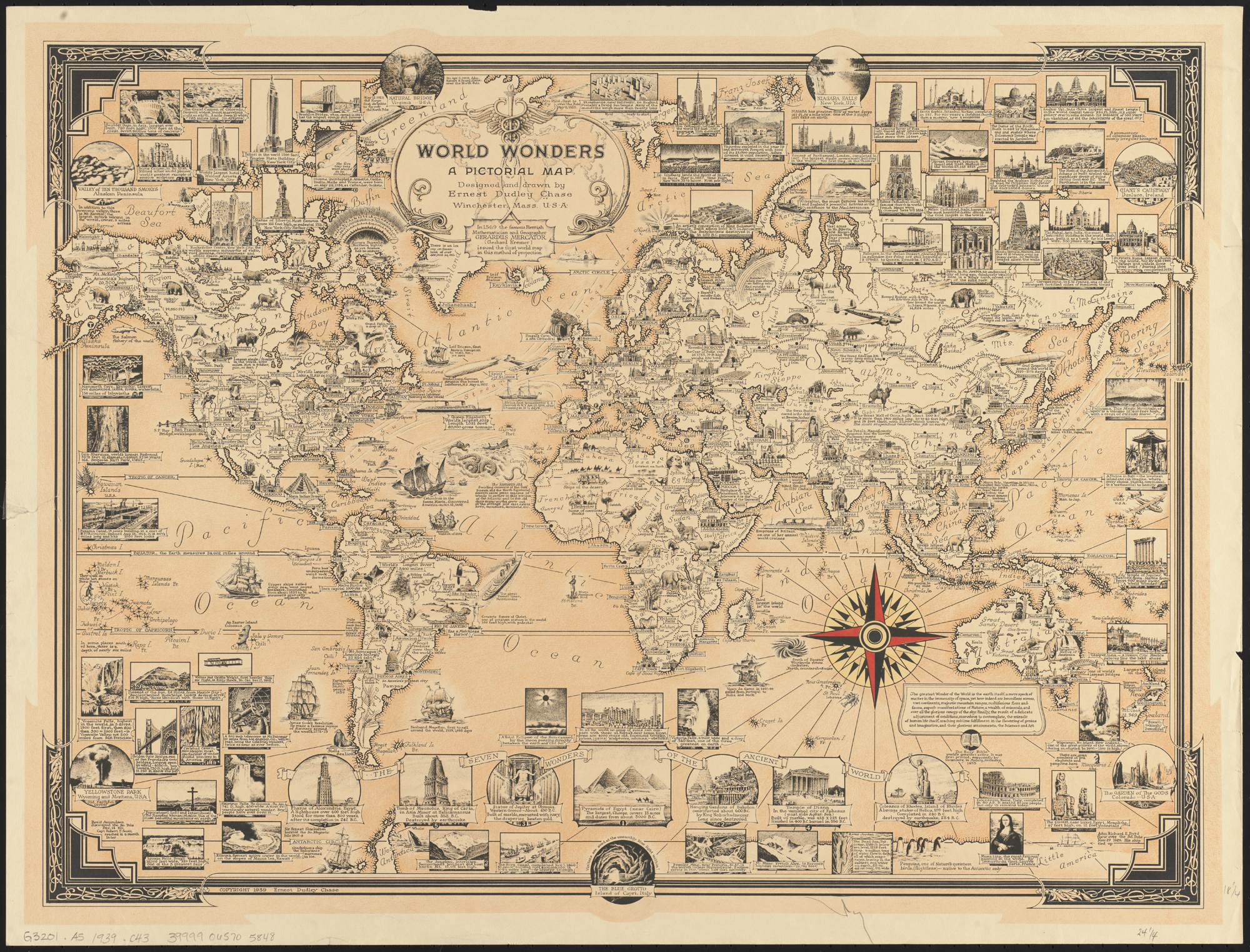
Ernest Dudley Chase's Pictorial Map of World Wonder

Of the 200 surveyed books, 67 (34%) contained at least one map. Of these, 49 (73.1%) books had one map, 15 (22.4%) had two, and 3 (4.5%) had more than two maps.

In a survey of the 92 fantasy maps within the 67 fantasy books, the main subject matter or content of the maps were of: a primary world – 13 (14.1%); a secondary world – 72 (78.3%); an imaginary city – 5 (5.4%); one or more buildings – 2 (2.2%).

The same survey showed that maps were orientated differently. 74 of 92 (80.4%) were orientated north, 9 (9.8%) were orientated northeast to northwest, 9 (9.8%) did not specify a cardinal orientation. Of the 92 maps 63 (68.5%) included a compass rose as a feature.

== Cartographic software ==
With the increased popularity of professional and recreational cartographic fantasy, the demand for computer programs to streamline the process has increased too. Two leaders in the budding industry are Wonderdraft and Inkarnate. Some software programs can create random terrain using fractal algorithms. Sophisticated programs can apply geologic effects such as tectonic plate movement and erosion; the resulting world can be rendered in great detail, providing a degree of realism to the result. OpenGeofiction allows anyone to practice fantasy cartography collaboratively.

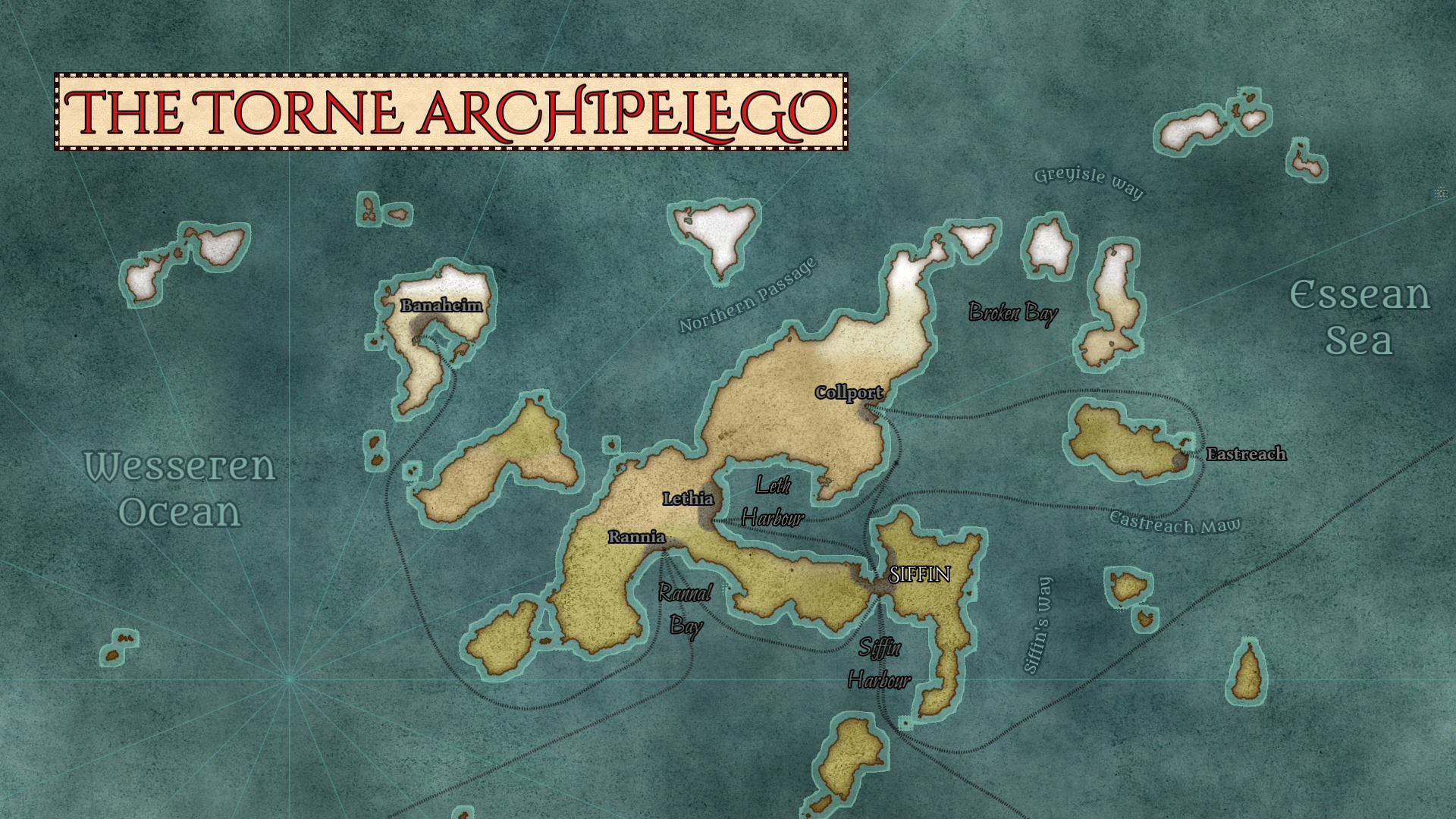
A map created in the program Wonderdraft

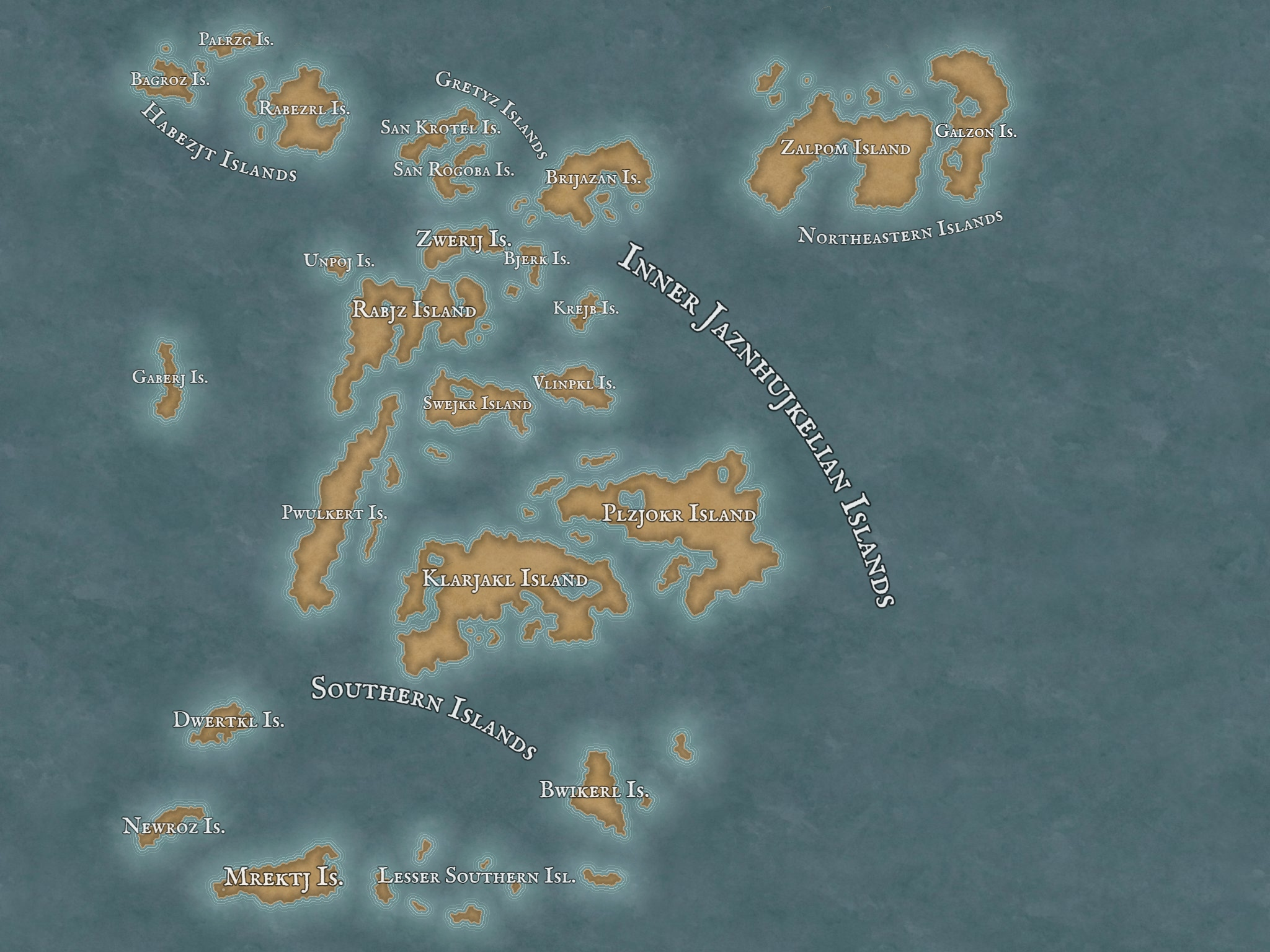
A map created in the program Inkarnate
