= Erkheim (Verwaltungsgemeinschaft) =

- Verwaltungsgemeinschaft
- Location of Erkheim within Unterallgäu district
- Interactive map of Erkheim
- Location within Germany Location within Bavaria
- Coordinates: 48°02′N 10°20′E
- Country: Germany
- State: Bavaria
- Admin. region: Swabia
- District: Unterallgäu
- Seat: Erkheim
- Subdivisions: 4 municipalities

Area
  - Total: 98.44 km^{2} (38.01 sq mi)

Population (2025-12-31)
  - Total: 8,698
  - Density: 88.36/km^{2} (228.8/sq mi)
- Time zone: UTC+01:00 (CET)
  - Summer (DST): UTC+02:00 (CEST)
- Website: www.vg-erkheim.de

Erkheim is a Verwaltungsgemeinschaft (municipal association) in the district of Unterallgäu in Bavaria, Germany. Its seat is in Erkheim. It consists of the following municipalities:

1. Erkheim
2. Kammlach
3. Lauben
4. Westerheim
