= Lauben, Unterallgäu =

Lauben
- Municipality
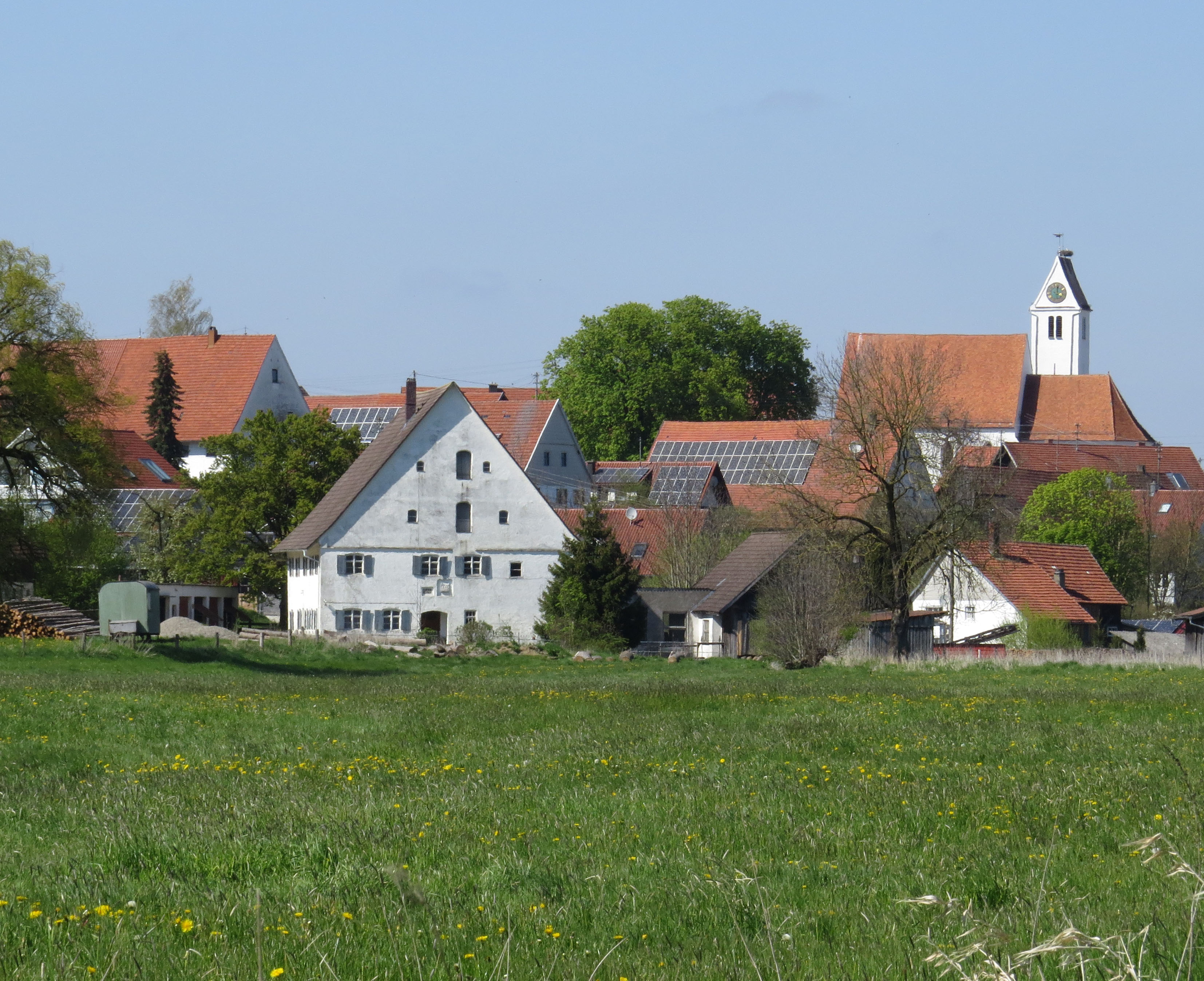
- Lauben seen from the south

- Coat of arms

- Location of Lauben within Unterallgäu district
- Interactive map of Lauben
- Location within Germany Location within Bavaria
- Coordinates: 48°3′N 10°17′E
- Country: Germany
- State: Bavaria
- Admin. region: Schwaben
- District: Unterallgäu
- Municipal assoc.: Erkheim

Government
  - Mayor (2020–26): Reiner Rößle

Area
  - Total: 18.4 km^{2} (7.1 sq mi)
- Elevation: 590 m (1,940 ft)

Population (2025-12-31)
  - Total: 1,391
  - Density: 75.6/km^{2} (196/sq mi)
- Time zone: UTC+01:00 (CET)
  - Summer (DST): UTC+02:00 (CEST)
- Postal codes: 87761
- Dialling codes: 08336
- Vehicle registration: MN
- Website: www.gemeinde-lauben.de

Lauben (German pronunciation: [ˈlaʊbn̩]) is a municipality in the district of Unterallgäu in Bavaria, Germany. The town has a municipal association with Erkheim.
