= Kammlach =

- Municipality
- Coat of arms

- Location of Kammlach within Unterallgäu district
- Interactive map of Kammlach
- Location within Germany Location within Bavaria
- Coordinates: 48°3′N 10°25′E
- Country: Germany
- State: Bavaria
- Admin. region: Schwaben
- District: Unterallgäu
- Municipal assoc.: Erkheim

Government
  - Mayor (2020–26): Birgit Steudter-Adl Amini

Area
  - Total: 26.73 km^{2} (10.32 sq mi)
- Elevation: 600 m (2,000 ft)

Population (2025-12-31)
  - Total: 1,862
  - Density: 69.66/km^{2} (180.4/sq mi)
- Time zone: UTC+01:00 (CET)
  - Summer (DST): UTC+02:00 (CEST)
- Postal codes: 87754
- Dialling codes: 08261
- Vehicle registration: MN

Kammlach is a municipality in the district of Unterallgäu in Bavaria, Germany. The town has a municipal association with Erkheim.
