= OpenGeofiction =

Collaborative fantasy map

- The continents of the OpenGeofiction world.
- Website type: Collaborative mapping
- Available in: Multilingual
- Products: Fantasy cartography
- Website: opengeofiction.net
- Commercial: No
- Registration: Required for contributors, not required for viewing
- Launched: 1 September 2013; 13 years ago
- Current status: Active
- Content license: Creative Commons Attribution-NonCommercial-ShareAlike 3.0

OpenGeofiction (abbreviated OGF) is an online collaborative mapping project focused on fantasy cartography and worldbuilding of a world analogous to Earth. It uses OpenStreetMap software and processes in a separate environment, providing an outlet for artistic expression that avoids interfering with OpenStreetMap's mapping of the real world and potentially mitigates the risk of vandalism there.

== History ==
OpenGeofiction was founded in September 2013 by the German software developer Thilo Stapff and urban planner Johannes Bouchain. It was partly inspired by a project called Urban Geofiction.

== Content ==
OpenGeofiction portrays a verisimilar world based on modern technology but fictitious geography. Many cultures are similar to the ones on Earth, but is not always the case. Both the natural and built environment are represented. The map tiles produced by the project are in Web Mercator projection.

== Participation ==
OpenGeofiction allows anyone with a free account to contribute directly to the map through an editor such as the iD Web application or desktop applications like JOSM or Merkaartor. Contributors can focus on various aspects of worldbuilding, including urban design, transportation, and nature. Because the project maintains a single, integrated fictional world, contributors must harmonize their fictional territories with neighboring territories. Thousands of users have contributed to the project.

== Uses ==
Places can be mapped in OpenGeofiction to illustrate stories or establish scenes for role-playing games. OpenGeofiction map tiles can be loaded into applications such as gvSIG for geospatial analysis. In 2018, OpenGeofiction data was used to model urban population movements in a hypothetical emergency evacuation using argument technology.
