= Westerheim, Bavaria =

Westerheim
- Municipality
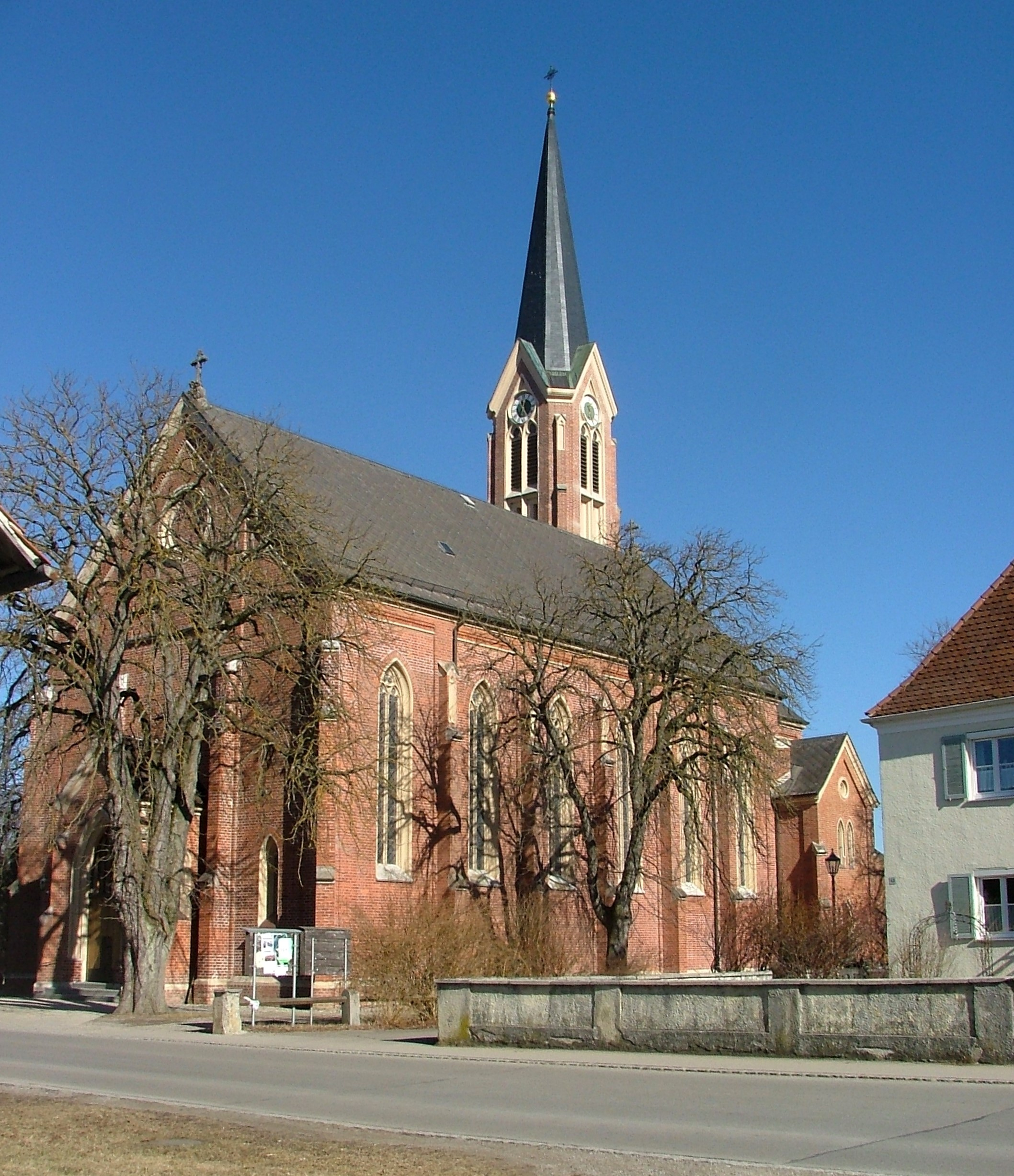
- Assumption of Mary Church

- Coat of arms

- Location of Westerheim within Unterallgäu district
- Interactive map of Westerheim
- Location within Germany Location within Bavaria
- Coordinates: 48°1′N 10°18′E
- Country: Germany
- State: Bavaria
- Admin. region: Schwaben
- District: Unterallgäu
- Municipal assoc.: Erkheim

Government
  - Mayor (2020–26): Christa Bail

Area
  - Total: 21.16 km^{2} (8.17 sq mi)
- Elevation: 602 m (1,975 ft)

Population (2025-12-31)
  - Total: 2,225
  - Density: 105.2/km^{2} (272.3/sq mi)
- Time zone: UTC+01:00 (CET)
  - Summer (DST): UTC+02:00 (CEST)
- Postal codes: 87784
- Dialling codes: 08336
- Vehicle registration: MN
- Website: www.vg-erkheim.de

Westerheim (German pronunciation: [ˈvɛstɐhaɪm]) is a municipality in the district of Unterallgäu in Bavaria, Germany. The town has a municipal association with Erkheim.
