= Erkheim =

- Municipality
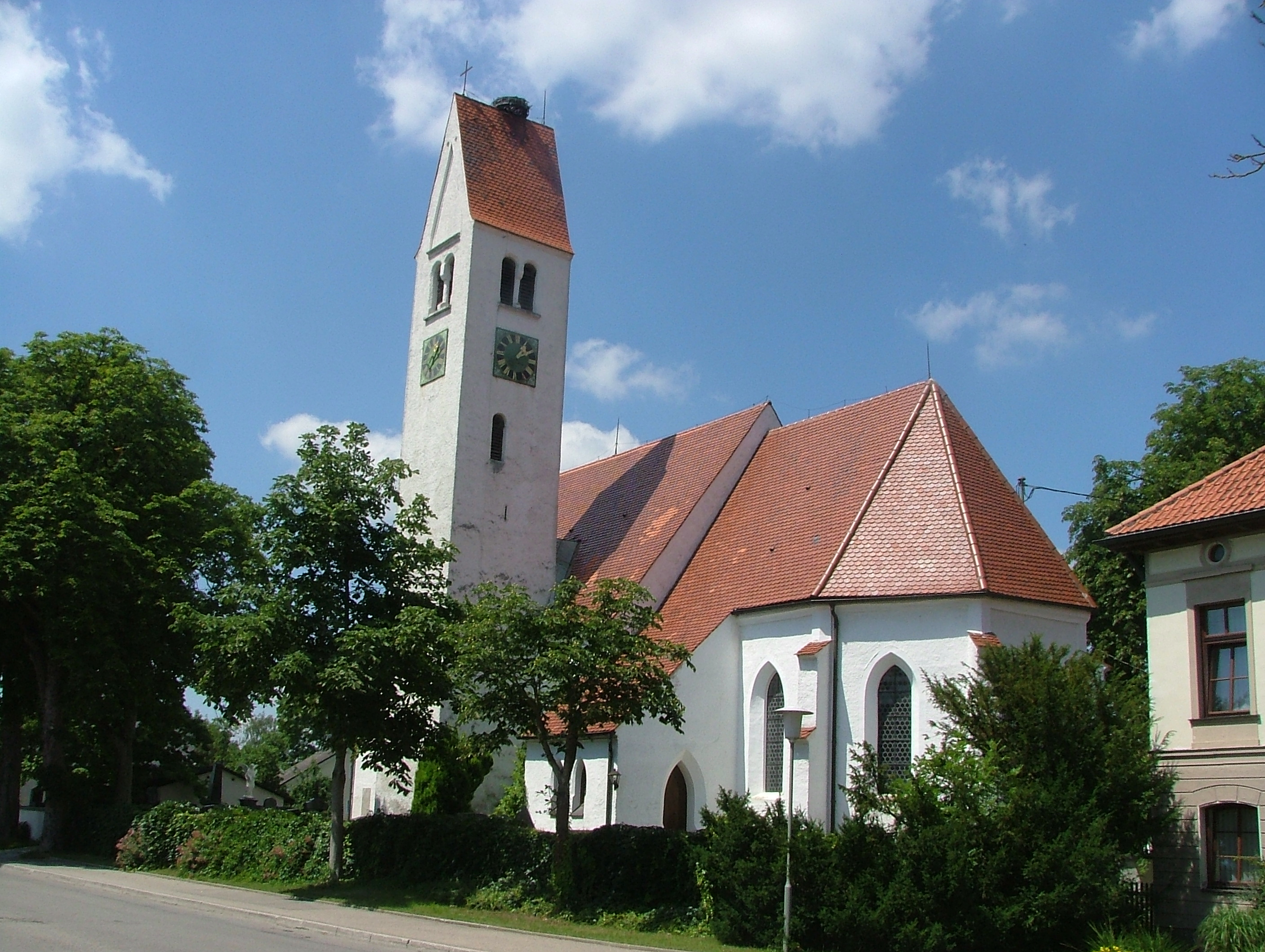
- Protestant church of Saints Peter and Paul

- Coat of arms

- Location of Erkheim within Unterallgäu district
- Interactive map of Erkheim
- Location within Germany Location within Bavaria
- Coordinates: 48°03′N 10°21′E
- Country: Germany
- State: Bavaria
- Admin. region: Schwaben
- District: Unterallgäu
- Municipal assoc.: Erkheim

Government
  - Mayor (2020–26): Christian Seeberger

Area
  - Total: 32.18 km^{2} (12.42 sq mi)
- Elevation: 595 m (1,952 ft)

Population (2025-12-31)
  - Total: 3,220
  - Density: 100/km^{2} (259/sq mi)
- Time zone: UTC+01:00 (CET)
  - Summer (DST): UTC+02:00 (CEST)
- Postal codes: 87746
- Dialling codes: 08336
- Vehicle registration: MN
- Website: www.erkheim.de

Erkheim is a municipality in the district of Unterallgäu in Bavaria, Germany.

== Politics ==
Mayors:

- 2002–2008: Konrad Engel
- 2008–2014: Peter Wassermann (CSU)

since 2014: Christian Seeberger (Christliche Wählervereinigung Erkheim)

The town is the seat of a municipal association with Kammlach, Lauben, Unterallgäu and Westerheim, Bavaria.

== Places of interest ==
- Catholic church Maria Himmelfahrt
- Protestant church Peter-und-Paul-Kirche
- World`s largest wooden head
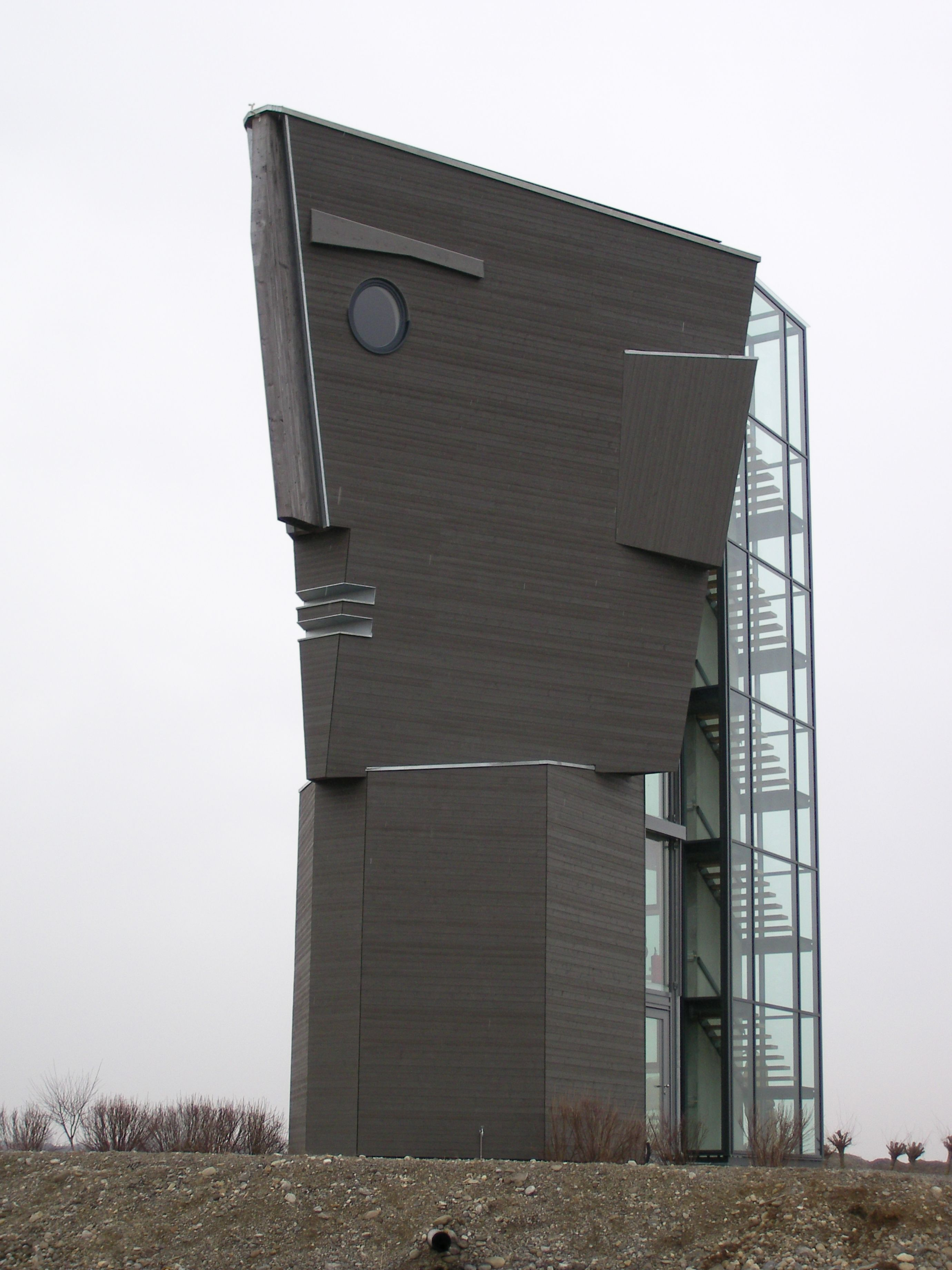
  Office building „Holzkopf“ of Baufritz by Diether Kunerth

=== Roads ===
Erkheim is directly connected to the A96 Autobahn.

=== Public transport ===
Erkheim is connected to the railway-system by the Sontheim/Schwaben railway station. The airport in Memmingen/Munich West is 10 kilometers away and the two international airports of Stuttgart and Munich are reachable within one hour.

=== Sports ===
In the western part of Erkheim is the sports centre of the TV Erkheim located. The grandstand has a capacity of approx. 400 people.

=== Associations ===
Erkheim is characterized by a lively club life. There are among others the following associations: Basketball Club Erkheim 2006 e. V, BBV Ortsverband Erkheim, Bläserschule Günz/Kammel e.V., Bulldogclub Erkheim, Bund der Selbständigen Markt Erkheim, Bund Naturschutz - Erkheim, Erkheimer Klausen, Freibad Markt Erkheim e.V., Förderverein Musikkapelle Markt Erkheim, Heimatpflege Markt Erkheim e.V, Musikkapelle Markt Erkheim e.V., Obst- und Gartenbauverein Erkheim, Reit- und Fahrclub Markt Erkheim e.V., Schützenverein Erkheim 1876, Sängerbund Erkheim, Tennisclub Erkheim, TV Erkheim, WC Hadde Hue

=== Famous people ===
Richard K. H. Burkart, born 1950 in Memmingen/Bavaria grew up in the Memminger Straße 7 in Erkheim and lived there until his move to Berlin. He has published several works in museums. His studio is in Berlin Kreuzberg.

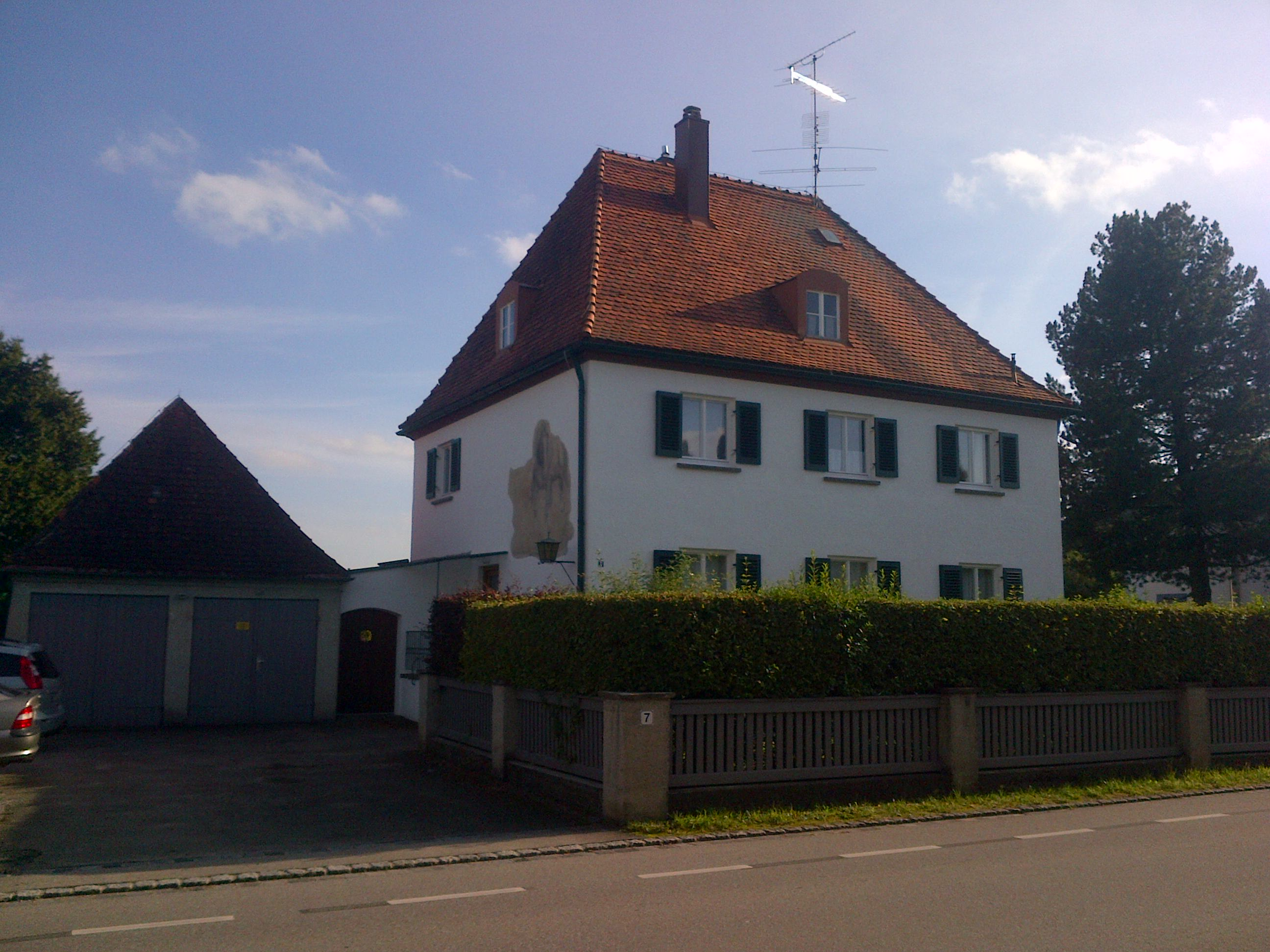
Birthplace of Richard Burkhart

=== Festivals ===
- Every year on the second July weekend is the Erkheimer Volksfest, a beer festival with a big tent.
