= St. Martin's Church, Memmingen =

St. Martin in Memmingen is one of the oldest churches in Upper Swabia

Coordinates: 47°59′09″N 10°10′44″E

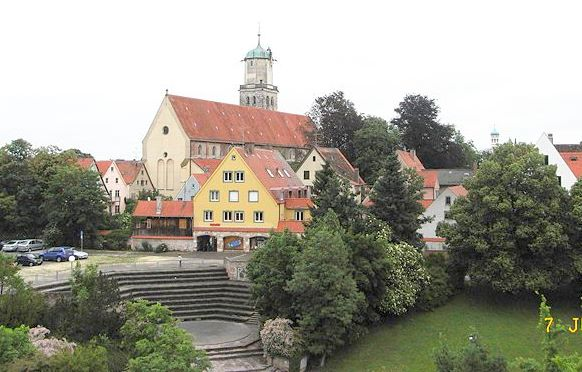
St. Martin's church from the west

The cultural heritage management city parish church of St. Martin in Memmingen is one of the oldest churches in Upper Swabia. The church is a landmark of the city and is located on the edge of the northwestern old town, in the old Protestant church district in front of the old abandoned cemetery on a rise of the Memminger Achtal. Its tower is visible from afar and, at about 65 meters, is the tallest building in the city.

Its history can be traced back to the 9th century. It was a scene of the Memmingen Reformation in the 16th century, which radiated to Upper Swabia and the Allgäu. The reformer was the preacher Christoph Schappeler.

The three-nave basilica, begun in its present form around 1325 and completed around 1500, is the main church of the Protestant-Lutheran church district of Memmingen, a regular place of preaching for the Memmingen dean and the center of one of the city's four Protestant-Lutheran parishes. The basilica, financed by the citizens, was the largest Gothic town church between Lake Constance and the Lech River after its completion. It houses many works of art, including the choir stalls, which are over 500 years old, are among the best late Gothic carvings in southern Germany, and are considered the city's greatest artistic treasure.

== History ==
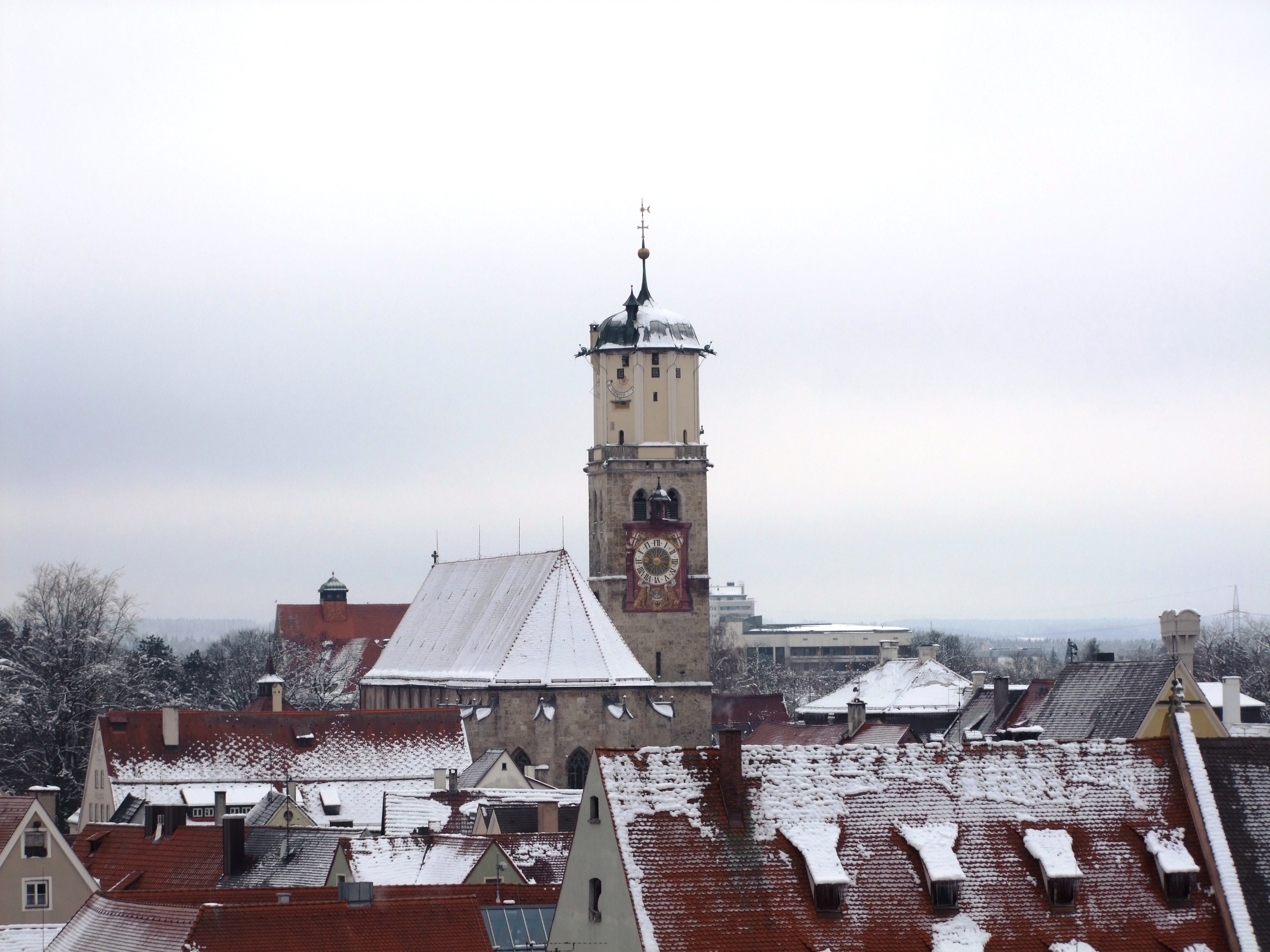
St. Martin's church from the east

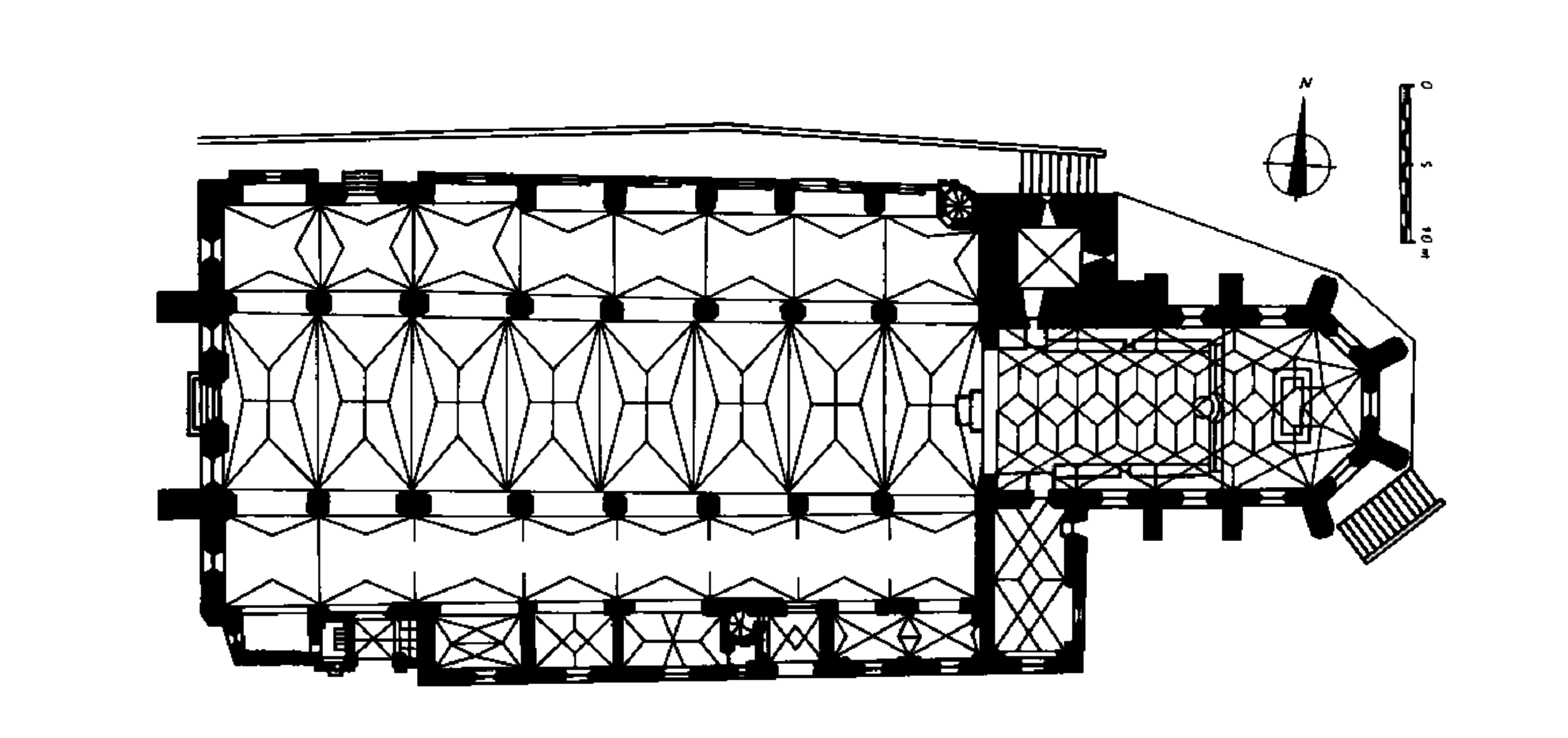
Church floor plan

Traces of settlements at the site of the church have been proven as early as the 2nd century AD. During excavations in 1912, remains of a Roman burgus were discovered under the building. The first church building on this site cannot be dated precisely. Researchers assume that it was built around the year 800. It is not clear whether St. Martin's or the Frauenkirche in the southern part of the city was the royal court church. The church, which had been Guelph until then, became Hohenstaufen in 1178/1179. In 1214, Frederick II handed over the patronage to the Antonines, who founded their first settlement on German soil in Memmingen. In the next years, accelerated by the growth and wealth of the city, the church became the city parish church. At the end of the 14th century the choir and the tower were built. This was followed by further interior reconstructions until the 20th century. In 1562 the patronage of the Antonines ended and the church was finally handed over to the town. The financing of all extensions and reconstructions was taken over by the citizens of the town. The Antonines (also called Antonians) built the Kinderlehrkirche opposite the eastern porch as an abbey church and limited themselves to this and their preceptory.

=== Guelph basilica ===
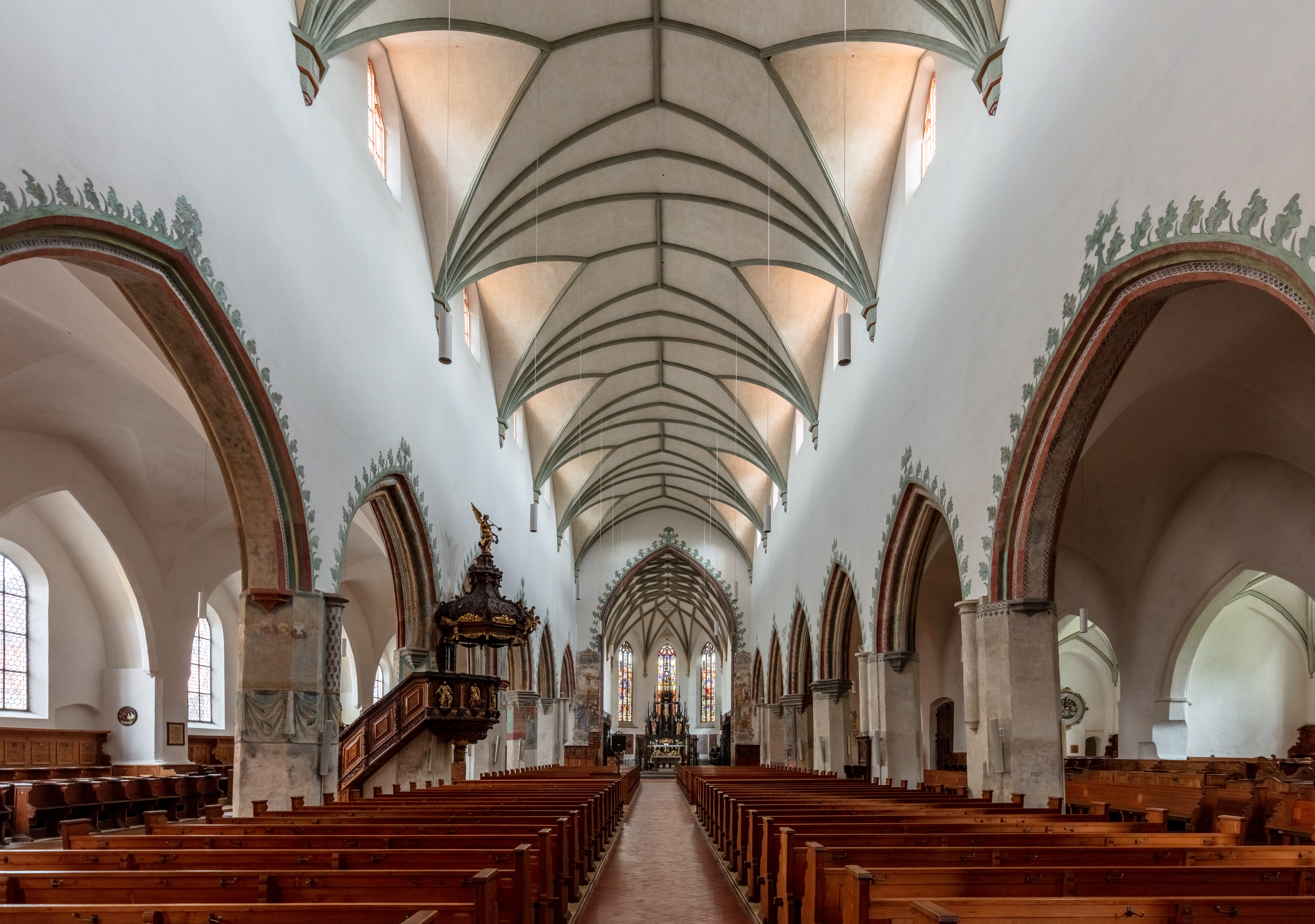
Inside view

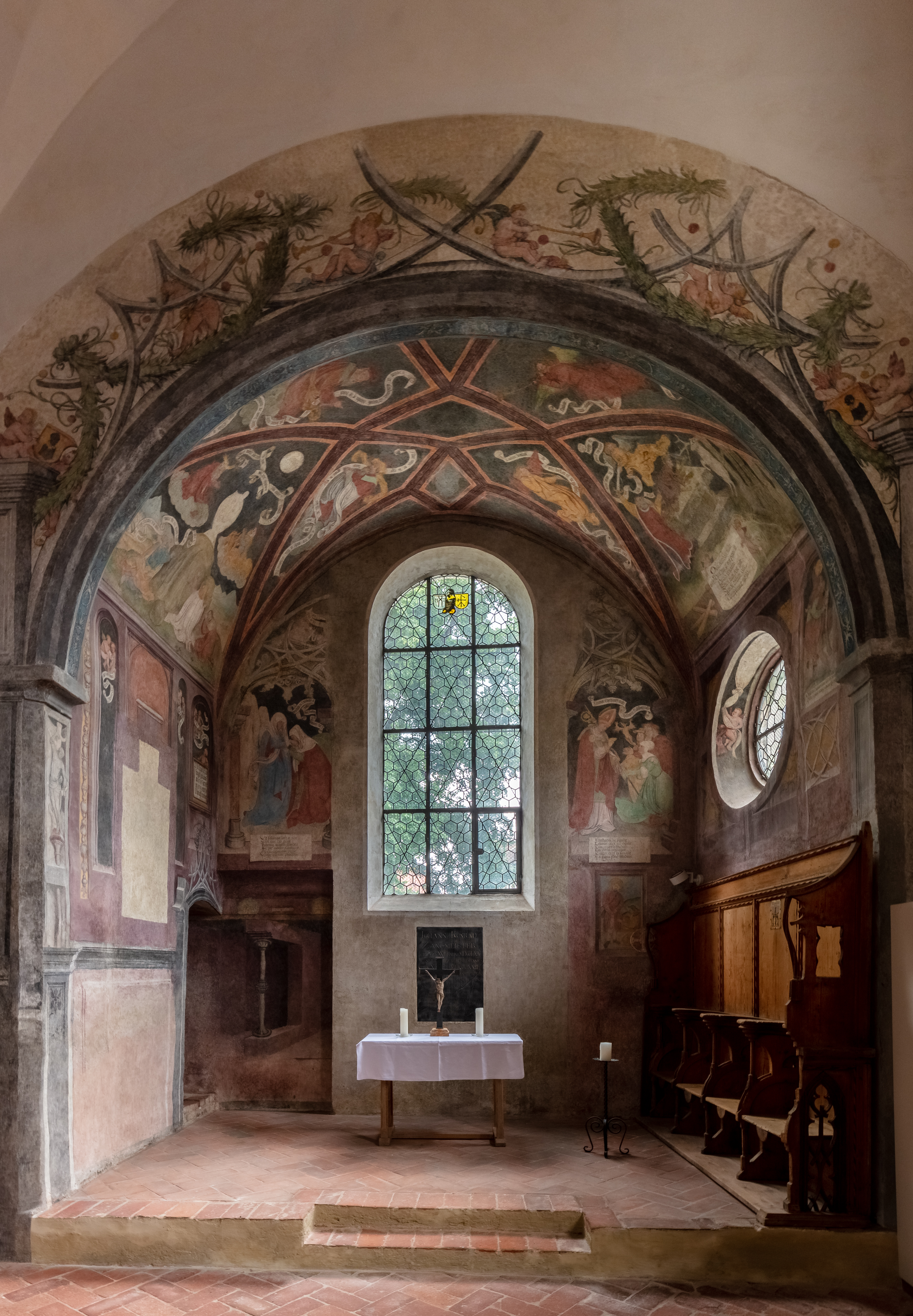
Small chapel

In the 10th century, the town of Memmingen came to the Guelphs. As a result, St. Martin's must have become a Guelph church of its own. It can be assumed that a strong building activity began. The building history of this time can be traced on the basis of chronicles. According to them, St. Martin was built in 926, extended in 1077 and remodeled in 1176. However, these dates cannot be proven by findings. The remodeling of 1176 fits well into the history of the city's development, so it can be assumed that this date is correct. Due to various irregularities within the present structure, it can be assumed that consideration was given to an earlier development. Thus, the eastern arch bay is 1.20 meters wider than the other bays, the sixth differs by 80 centimeters from the usual arch span. The southeast portal is not in harmony with the Gothic arcade rhythm, so that when entering one looks at a pillar. Presumably, a Gothic porch was added to the Romanesque structure. Researchers assume that the previous building was a basilica with a pair of western towers. According to this, the transept had its location in the first bay, while the towers were located in the sixth bay. According to the proportions of the time, there would have been room for six Romanesque bays between the towers and the transept. A reconstruction of the basilica on this basis would fit in with other Guelph buildings. In 1216, St. Martin became a pilgrimage church. A blood relic was transferred to the church from nearby Benningen. As early as 1446, its status as an altar sacrament was withdrawn by the Bishop of Augsburg and Cardinal Peter von Schaumberg, after the host had gradually decayed. He only allowed its veneration as a relic. During the Reformation, the blood host is said to have been walled up in an unknown place.

=== Extension to the Gothic basilica ===
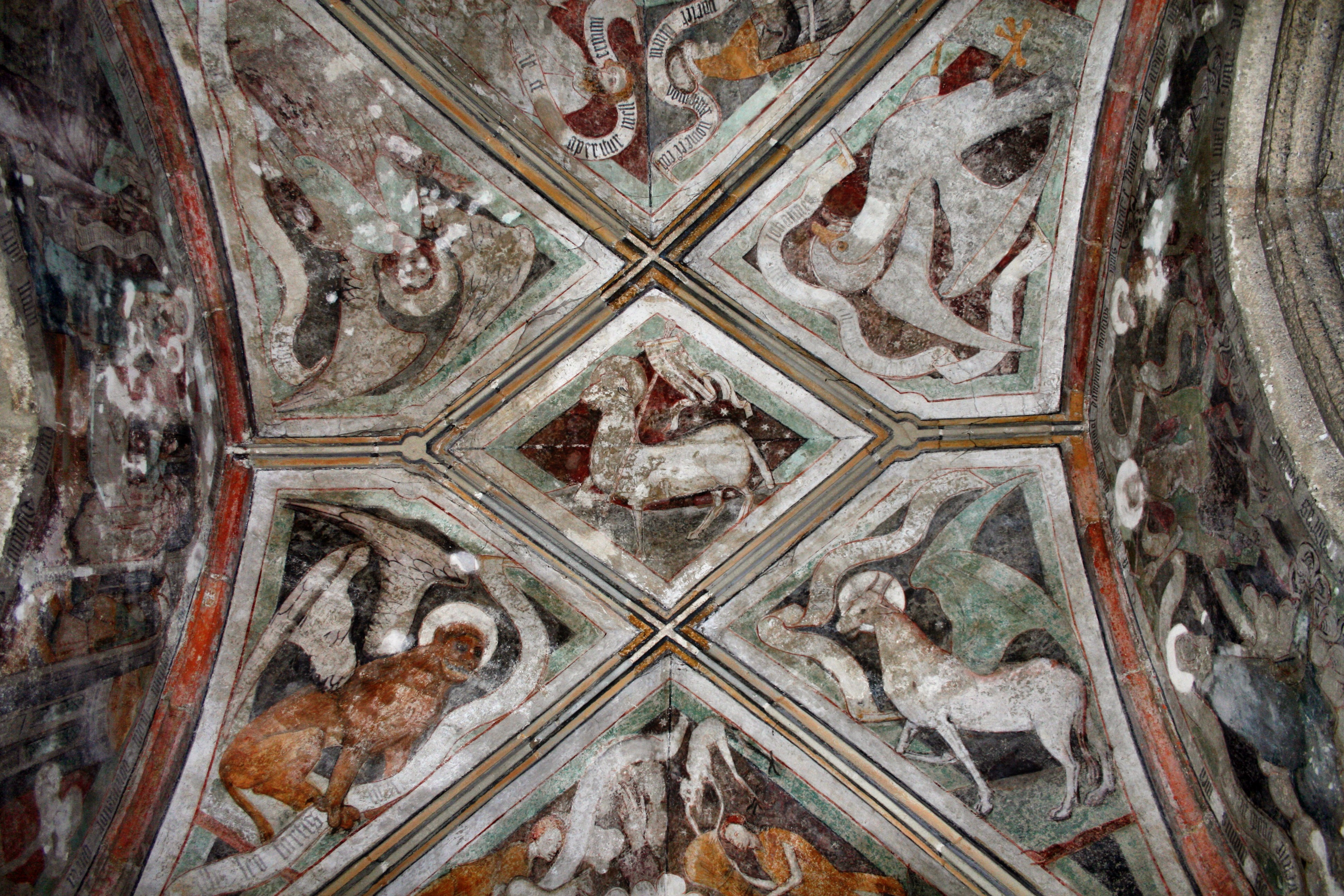
Entrance frescoes

Around 1325, the church had become too small for the greatly increased number of citizens of the town, so the first extensions were made. The tower and a choir were added. A buttress and a window tracery in the northern choir are preserved from this high Gothic building. The dating is based on a preserved fresco fragment on the wall of the lowest tower storey. Following this construction, the first pairs of pillars of the nave and the northern row of arcades with the more strongly dimensioned wall field rising above them must have been built. Around 1345, the construction measures came to a standstill, although in the same year Emperor Ludwig the Bavarian gave "the two bread tables" (probably Memmingen's first market) for the expansion of the cemetery. Whether this was connected with the political unrest around Emperor Ludwig IV or with the plague epidemic of 1349 could not be clarified. Only in the middle of the second half of the 14th century is there evidence of a renewed start of building activity. The unknown master builder must have enjoyed a good education in the Gothic architecture of his time, since the ponderous construction of the first buttresses was changed from the second bay into a slimmer, high Gothic architectural style. With the start of construction of the fourth bay with a plain console construction, the master builder must have changed again. After the fifth bay was completed, there was a longer pause in the building activity. Researchers assume that the Westwork of the Guelph basilica was located there and that it was thus provisionally completed.

From 1404/1405, work began on the expansion of the sixth yoke. However, the city workers could not cope with it, so the city council turned to Munich. In 1405 Conrad von Amberg was engaged for the extension. Presumably, the old west work made the extension extremely difficult, since it partly served as a structural system for the arcades and had to be partly demolished and partly integrated. The sixth bay had to be 80 centimetres wider than the existing bays. Conrad raised the central nave walls to their final height. By 1407, the roof structure had already been erected. It is one of the earliest examples of the recumbent chair in the German-speaking world. This made it possible to include the first attic in the central nave. It is assumed that only Master Conrad completed the fourth tower floor with the high tented roof. Similar examples of this Gothic church tower roofing can be found in Woringen and in Westerheim. By 1409/1410, Conrad vom Amberg had completed the church as a six-bay basilica.

In the following years, activities concentrated mainly on the interior construction. The eastern porches were built in 1438, and the vaulting of the side naves, begun in 1458, was only made possible by massive donations from the Besserer and Wespach families. The Funk Chapel marked the beginning of a series of chapel endowments in the basilica. Thus, the Vöhlin Chapel was added in 1476 and the Vöhlin Chapel in 1482. In 1489–1491, the demolition of two houses in Zangmeisterstraße enabled the nave to be extended by two bays. Since the Memmingen master builders were overburdened with this delicate task, the city council was able to win over the Ulm master builder Matthäus Böblinger. From 1496 to 1500, the choir was rebuilt, thus completing the largest city parish church between Lake Constance and Lech.

=== Parish church and Reformation ===
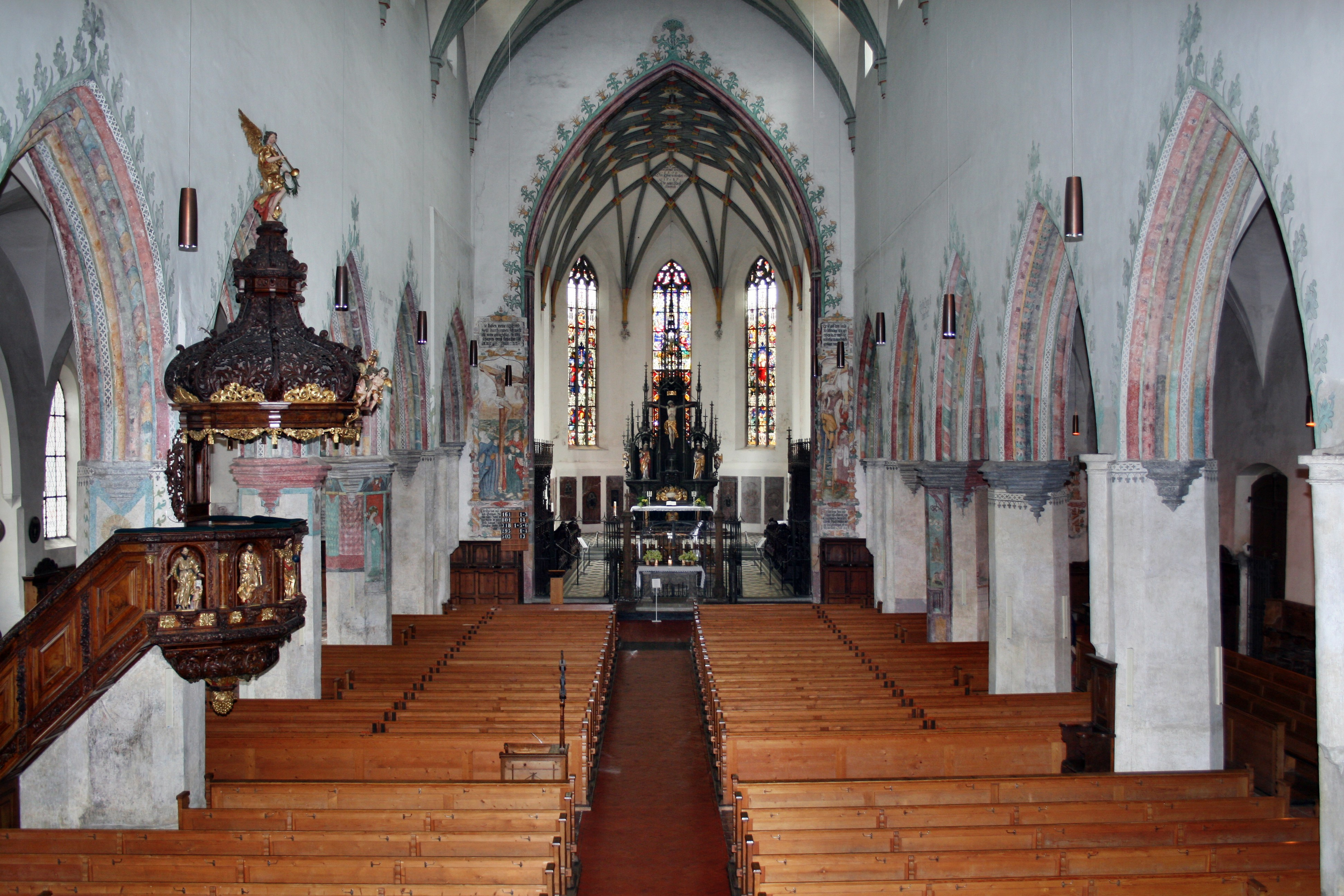
View from the organ loft into the nave with pulpit and high altar

Under the Swiss preacher Christoph Schappeler, the Reformation spread in Memmingen starting in 1524. Schappeler held a well-paid preacher's post at the Vöhlin Chapel in St. Martin's. In that year, he performed baptism in German for the first time. Together with Lindau, Constance and Strasbourg, the city, which initially had a Zwingli orientation, presented a special confession, the Tetrapolitan Confession (Quadrennial Confession), at the Diet of Augsburg in 1530.

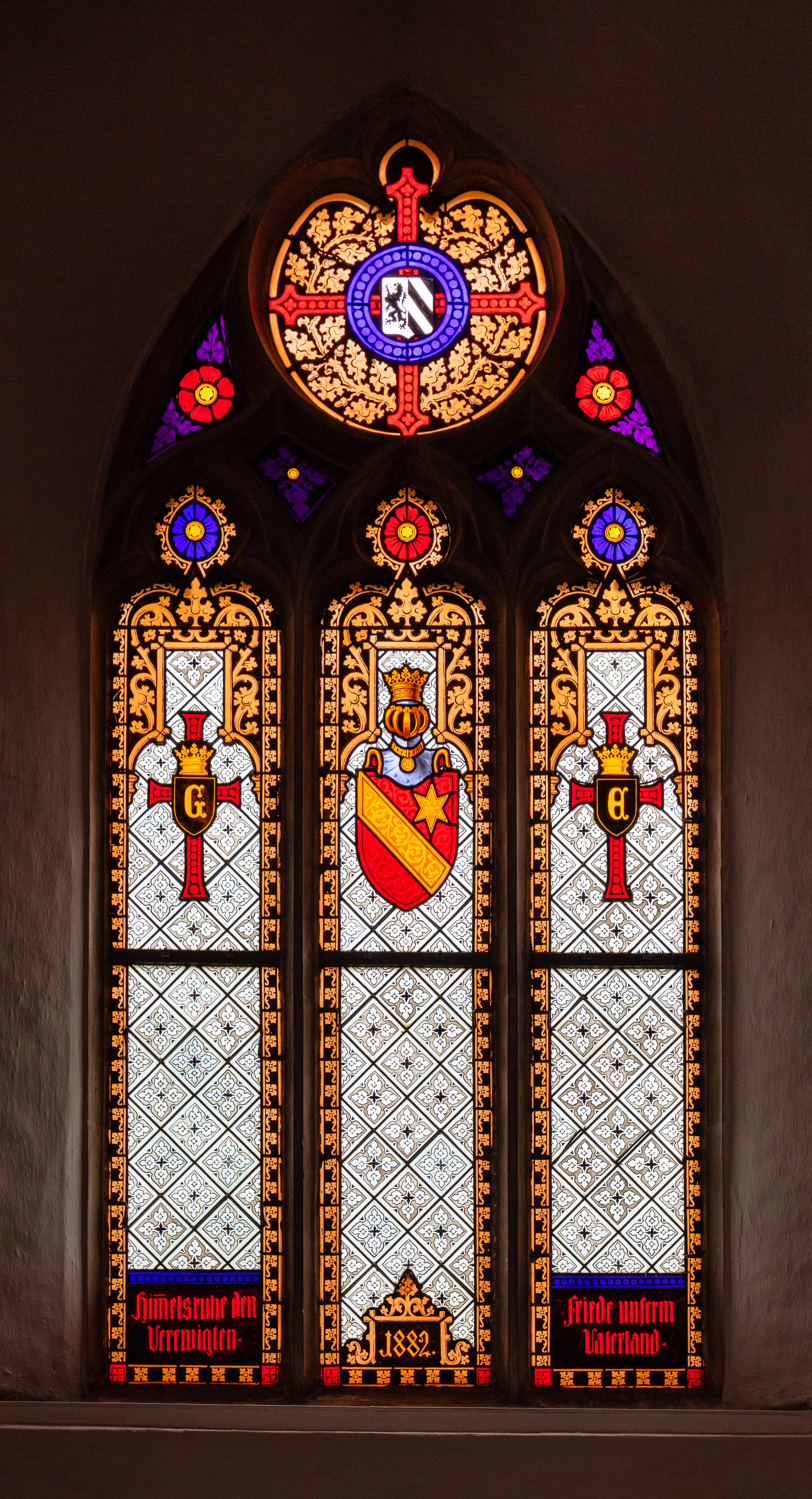
Stained glass

A city council decision from 1531, which stated that all ecclesiastical cult objects had to disappear from the city's churches, led to the greatest loss of St. Martin's furnishings. The church lost 21 side altars and the late Gothic high altar in the choir room. Of the furnishings of the high choir, only the choir stalls remained.

In 1532, the city professed the Lutheran doctrine by adopting the Augsburg Confession. Finally, Memmingen and thus also St. Martin's became committed to the Lutheran doctrine in 1536 by accepting the Wittenberg Concord.

=== After the Reformation ===
During the Thirty Years' War, Emperor Ferdinand II issued the Edict of Restitution, according to which all property expropriated during the Reformation was to be returned to the Catholic owners. This also affected St. Martin, but the town successfully defended itself against it. During the shelling by the imperial forces and the Bavarians in 1647, the church was also hit, damaging the wooden ceiling. Hans Knoll replaced it with a board vault made of ribs and keystones with painting, similar to the choir vault. Knoll also created a musicians' and singers' matroneum in the first nave aisle in 1656. The medieval churchyard wall was demolished in 1810. At the same time, the former churchyard was transformed into a park-like landscape with tree plantings. The ceiling of the nave was redesigned starting in 1845 and a false vault was added. The nave and tower were re-roofed with slate in 1867 and 1872. From 1926 to 1927 the church was renovated and the roofing was taken back. From 1962 to 1965 and from 1984 to 1988 the church was renovated again.

=== Tower ===
Nothing remains of the predecessor towers of the Guelph Basilica on the west side. The first tower construction on the present site is dated around 1300. The lowest floor of the present tower was built around 1325. A further construction of the fifth floor must be dated to around 1370. The brick format of 34×16.5×7.5 centimeters used there was also bricked in the Frauenkirche tower built around 1370. The other floors were added around 1405 to 1410 by master builder Conrad von Amberg. At that time, the tower was topped with a high pointed helmet with green slab roofing. The spiral staircase leading from the north nave to the second floor burned down in 1420. In 1428, the current belfry was built into the tower as a scaffolding structure. Until then, the bells hung in a beam system connected to the masonry. Two years later, the pointed spire rising above four stone gables was completed. Due to the vaulting of the side naves within the church, the tower entrance was moved to its present location in the northeast corner. After a lightning strike in 1470, the tower received a spire knob and it was re-roofed with green-glass tiles. The tower was saved in 1482 by quick extinguishing measures of the population after four lightning bolts had struck the tower and set it on fire. Chronicles record two nightly lightning strikes in 1494, when the later Emperor Maximilian I entered the city. The tower helmet, destroyed by another lightning strike in 1535, was replaced in 1537 by the present octagonal structure on the tower stump. A wooden bay window was added above the clock face of the tower clock in 1573. The master carpenter Jacob Britzel and the coppersmith Bartholomäus Seybrand erected a Welsh canopy made of copper above the helmet. Since then, the tower has had a height of about 65 meters. In 1872 the dome was covered with slate, which was reversed during the renovation in 1927. The tower was renovated in 1966 and for the last time in 2012. Since its construction, the lower part belonged to the parish, the upper part to the city. In 1927, the city also gave its part to the parish.

== Building description ==
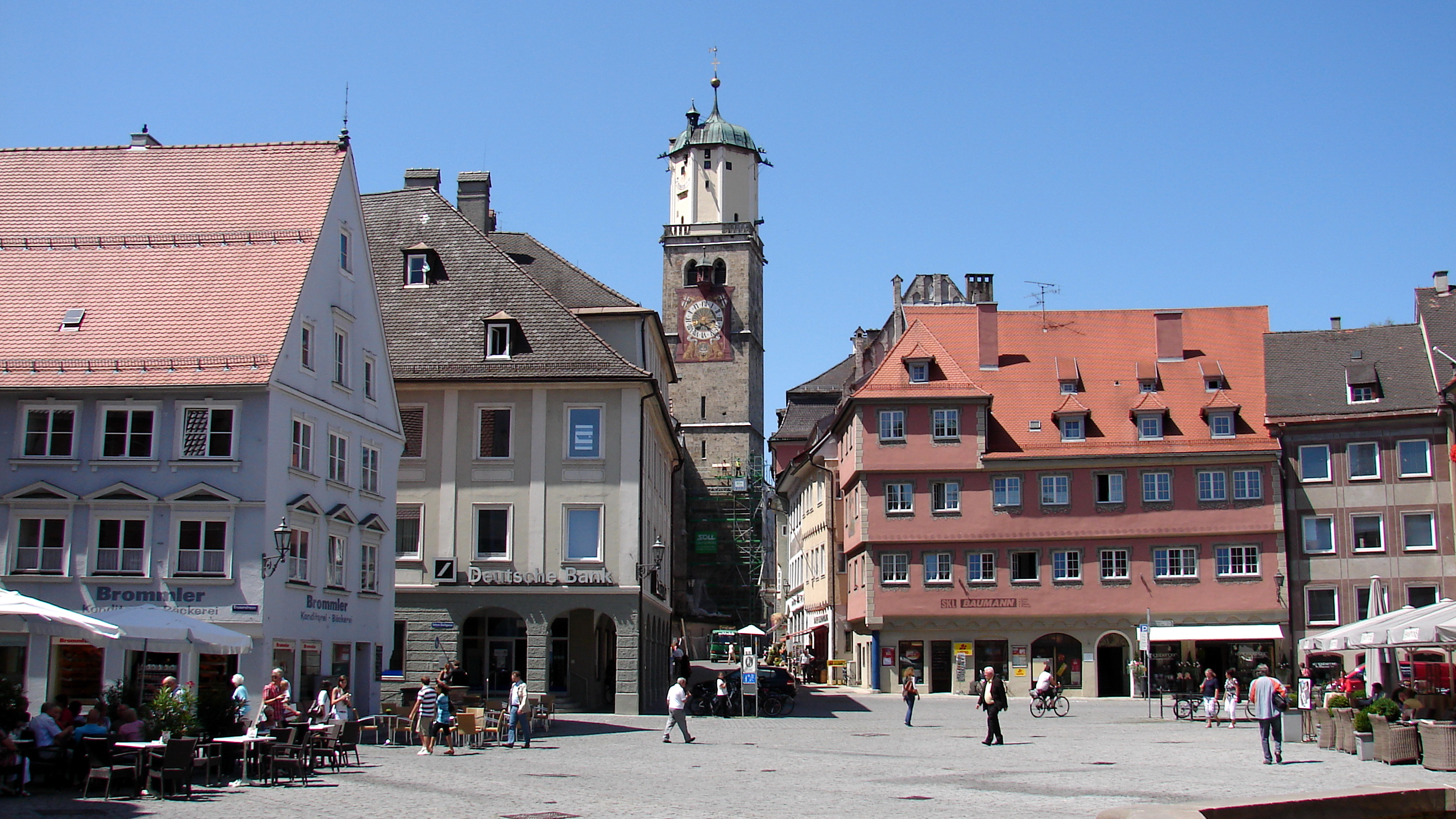
Marktplatz with St. Martin

The church is a three-nave, eight-bay basilica with a raised chancel ending in a Fünfachtelschluss. The northern part of the building is characterized by the tower and the choir. On the southern side is the old cemetery of the town, abandoned since 1530. On it there are over 300 years old beech trees and younger chestnut trees. Opposite the eastern porch stands the Kinderlehrkirche.

=== Exterior construction ===
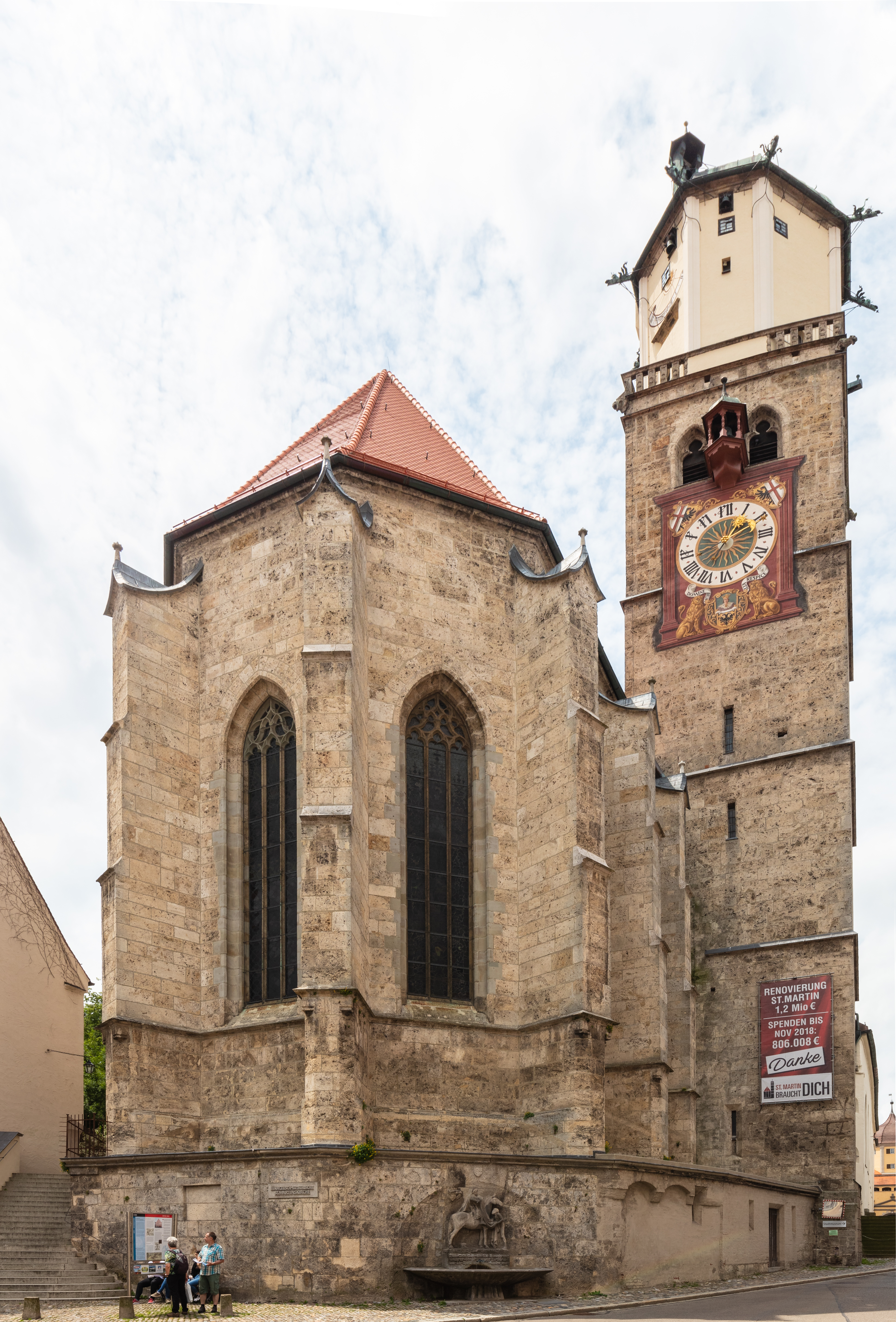
The tower seen from the Marktplatz

The outer walls of the side naves protrude behind the choir. In front of the nave, the choir is joined by the new sacristy on the south side and the old sacristy and tower on the north side. The central nave has a side gable roof, while the two side naves have a pent roof. The walls are made of plastered brickwork. Above the side naves, one skylight decorated with simple tracery is visible per bay. Directly below the windows is the roofing of the side naves. The tracery of the windows in the side naves was removed during the Baroque period, and the former pointed arches were reworked into round arches. Due to the construction method with plastered bricks, the individual construction stages are not visible externally. The western side is completely plastered. It is bordered by the narrow passage of Martin Luther Square, which narrows into a street at this point. Above the west portal of the church, called the bride gate, there used to be two windows, which are walled up today. Above it there is a small round window, which is followed by another, slightly larger round window at the level of the apex of the gable roof. The choir is made of tuff. The windows are decorated with tracery. The buttresses have little decoration.

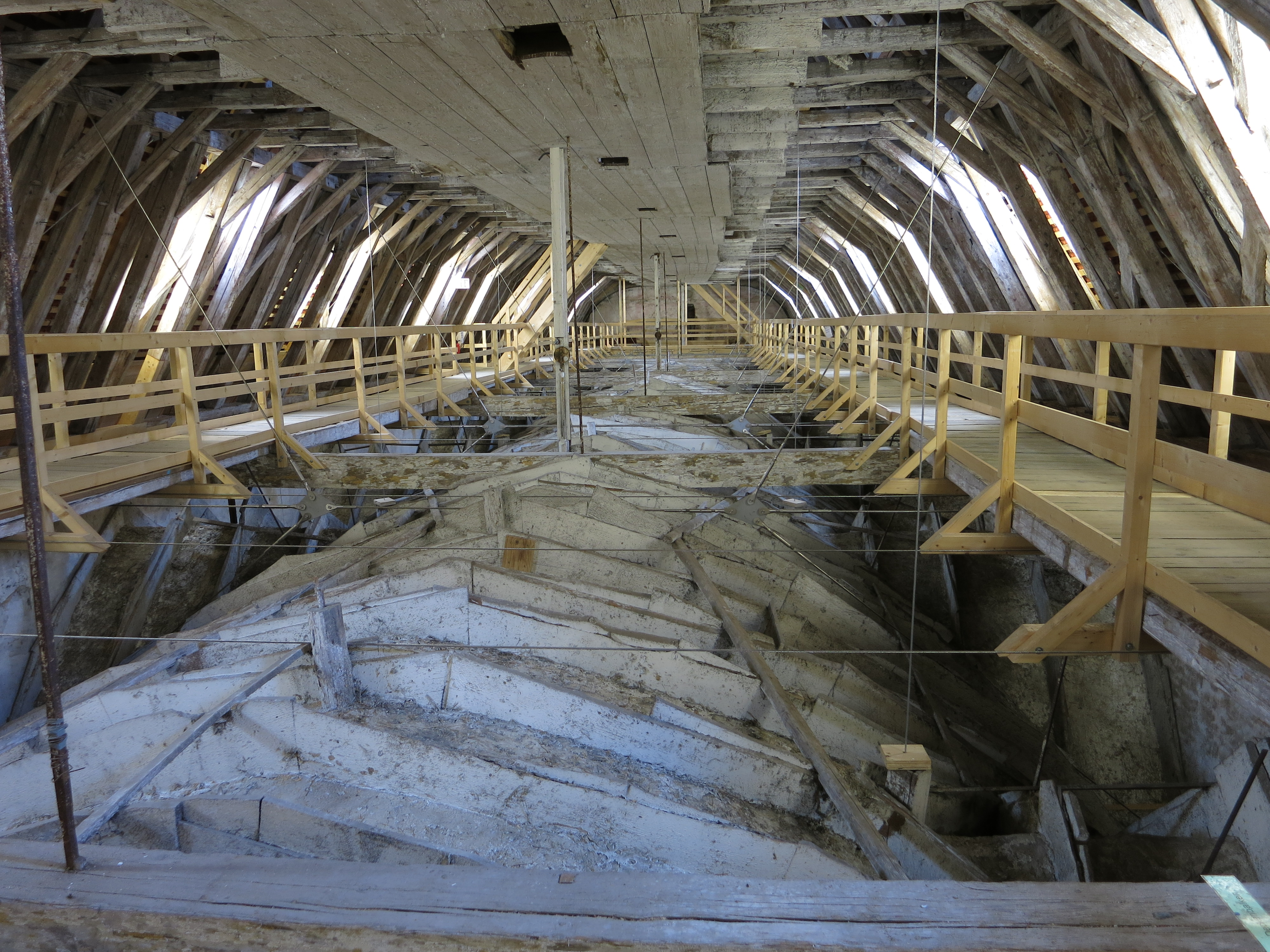
In the roof of St. Martin

=== Interior ===
==== Middle nave ====
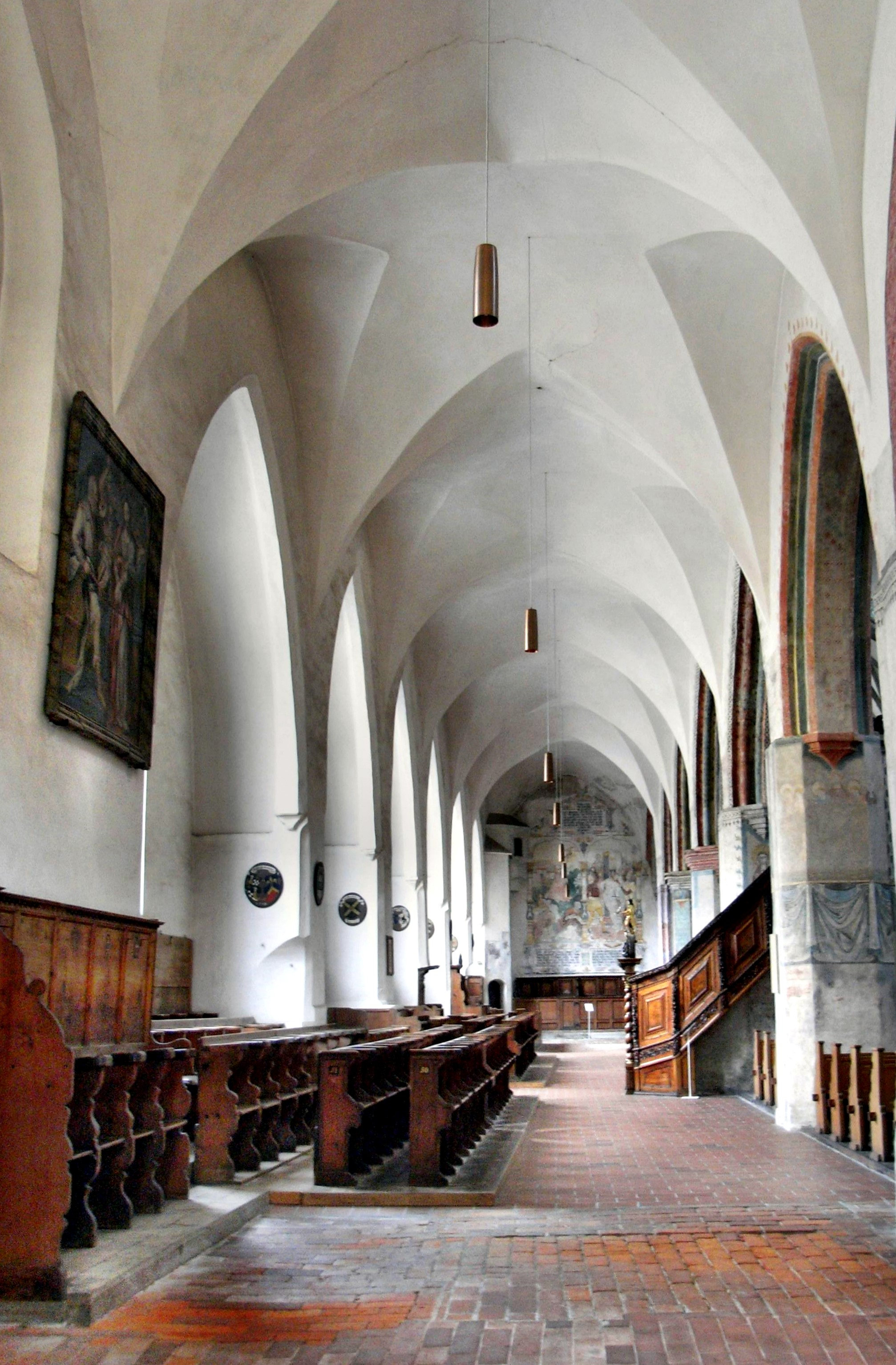
North nave

The 11.40 meter wide central nave is 50 meters long and 18.80 meters high. It can be entered directly through the so-called bridal gate on the west side. The walls above the eight bays are kept simple. The architectural style corresponds to the Gothic. It used to be closed off at the top by a flat wooden ceiling. In the course of historicism in the 19th century, the ceiling height was reduced by 3.80 meters in 1845, a mock vault in Gothic style was inserted and attached to the hanging beams of the roof truss with iron rods. Skylights provide light in the central nave. The yoke arches rest on octagonal piers, the easternmost of which were obviously reused. Researchers assume that these spolia originate from another, demolished church. Chronologically, the predecessor building of the Ulm Minster could fit in with this. Due to the scarcity of natural stone in Upper Swabia, only bricks could be used, which stood in the way of a High Gothic style of construction.

==== North nave ====
The north nave is 50 meters long, 5.7 meters wide and 9.45 meters high. It is entered through two entrances on the Zangmeisterstrasse, which stood in the way of the larger expansion of the north nave chapels. The chapels are recognizable as small pointed arch niches between the buttresses. Only the brotherhood chapel of 1501 deviates from this with its round arch. The north nave is closed by an unpainted, whitewashed Gothic ribbed vault.

==== South nave ====
The south nave is slightly higher than the north nave at ten meters, all other dimensions being equal. It has two entrances via the eastern and western porches. There are several larger chapels in it. It is closed by a Gothic ribbed vault.

==== Choir ====
The choir is 24.6 meters long and 10.67 meters wide. It is whitewashed. The late Gothic high windows are stained glass in the front part, and clear glass on the long sides. Beneath the windows, in the slightly elevated high altar area, are inset tombstones that used to be on the floor of the church. The choir is closed off at a height of 17.62 meters by a Gothic star-net vault, on which there are also the only frescoes in the choir.

== Equipment ==
The church is rich in works of art of painting and woodcarving, dating from the 13th to the 19th century.

=== Carvings ===
Carvings can be found on the choir stalls, the high altar, the pews and the pulpit. The decoration of the new sacristy can also be considered a large single work. All other sacred carvings were destroyed or saved to other church buildings during the iconoclasm ordered by the city council on 19 July 1531.

==== Choir pews ====
One of the most magnificent and expressive choir stalls in southern Germany was created in St. Martin's between 1501 and 1507. Along with the choir stalls in Ulm Minster by Jörg Syrlin the Elder and the stalls in Konstanz Minster, it is the most important late Gothic work in Germany. The choir stalls are still in use for worship.

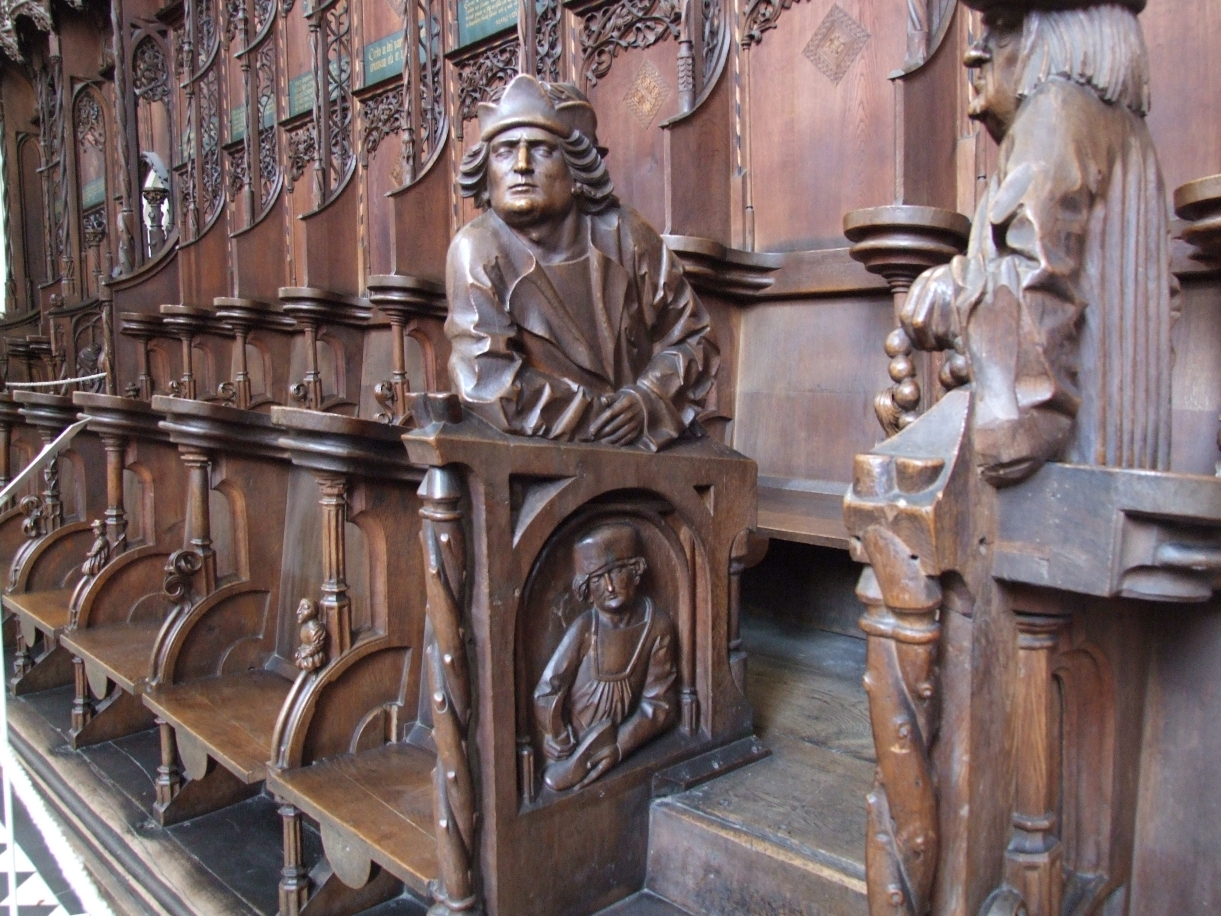
The choir stalls, completed in 1507, extensively restored in 1892-1901

At that time, the imperial city of Memmingen was at the peak of its history - an economic, political and cultural model of success. This success was particularly evident in the lively building activity. In the main parish church of St. Martin, the last years of the 15th century were characterized by the expansion of the church interior, its furnishing with chapels and altars and, from 1496, the construction of a new high choir, the exterior of which was made of tuff.

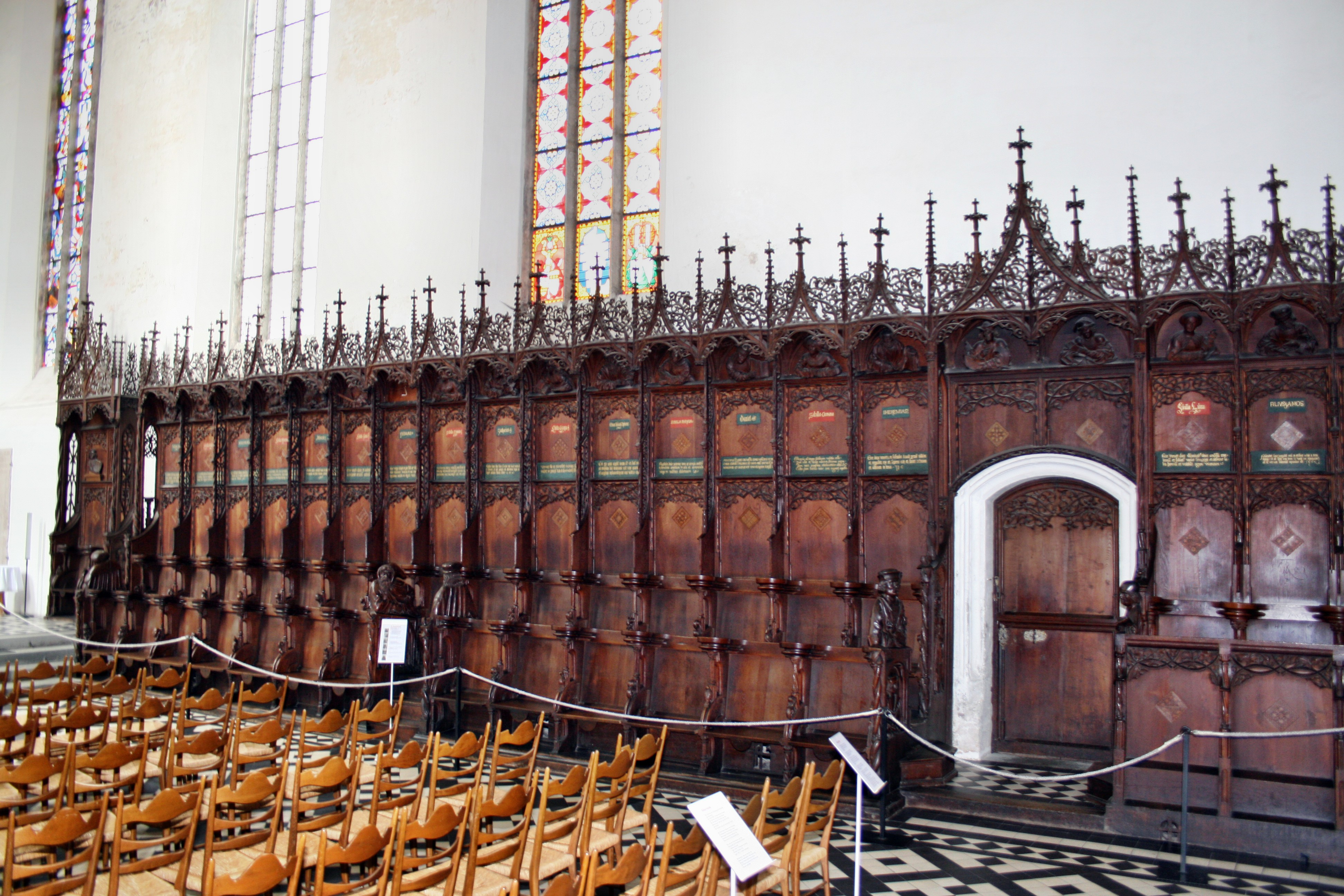
The right part of the choir stalls

Inside the chancel, the star-net vault provides a filigree roof and a dignified setting for the choir stalls. The order for this was placed in September 1501 by the two churchwardens of St. Martin. By 1507, the masters Hans Stark (carpenter) and Hans Herlin (sculptor) created a pew carved from oak wood with a total of 63 seats. On some of the sculptures of this choir stalls we can also recognize two of Herlin's journeymen: Hans Thoman and Christoph Scheller. Both later achieved artistic greatness as masters in their own right.

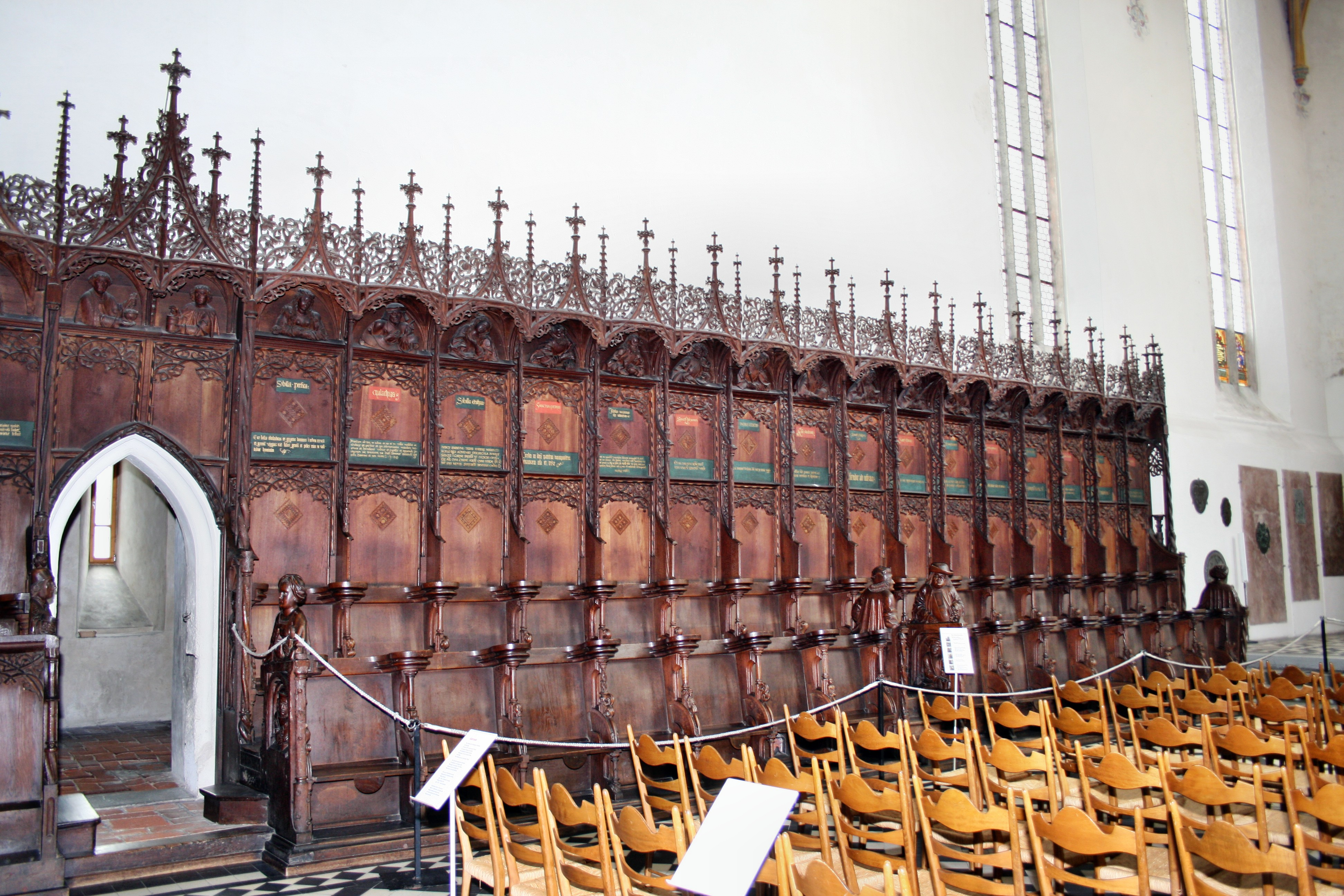
The left part of the choir stalls

Interrupted by two portals, 66 sculptures in the Memmingen choir stalls depict two cycles: The theological cycle shows sibyls and prophets of the Old Testament under the canopies. They testify to the coming of the Messiah in Christ. Expressive portraits of people from Memmingen's history can be seen on the front sides of the chairs. However, it is not always possible to precisely identify specific persons. Only the objects that the large sculptures hold in their hands provide a reasonably certain assignment. For example, the mayor and his wife or the amman and his wife can be more closely identified. A figure previously interpreted as the abbot of the Antonite abbey can with great probability not be identified as such. However, the persons depicted must have been so well known in Memmingen that a more detailed explanation was not necessary. Also, in the case of one of the sculptures, it can be assumed with relative certainty that it represents the Roman-German king and later emperor Maximilian I, who often stayed in Memmingen, especially at the time the choir stalls were created, and called the city his "cell of rest and sleep." Also because the Antonite abbey preceptor was his house chaplain, this assumption seems to be close to the truth.

But also the numerous intarsias on the back walls and the calligraphic variety of the writing fields, which do not appear in any other choir stalls of this time, deserve attention. They originate from the workshop of Bernhard Strigel. In the past, it was assumed that the inlays were added to the choir stalls later. However, due to various details, it can now be said with certainty that the inlaid fields - two on each chair - were already inserted at the time of their creation.

The choir stalls were comprehensively restored and missing parts were added between 1892 and 1901 by the Memmingen cabinetmaker Leonhard Vogt. The canopy, which had been removed in 1813/1814, was put back on the choir stalls. Research has shown that earlier parts of the figures were painted. This made a more lifelike representation possible. The choir stalls are among the most famous and artistic in Germany.

==== Pulpit ====
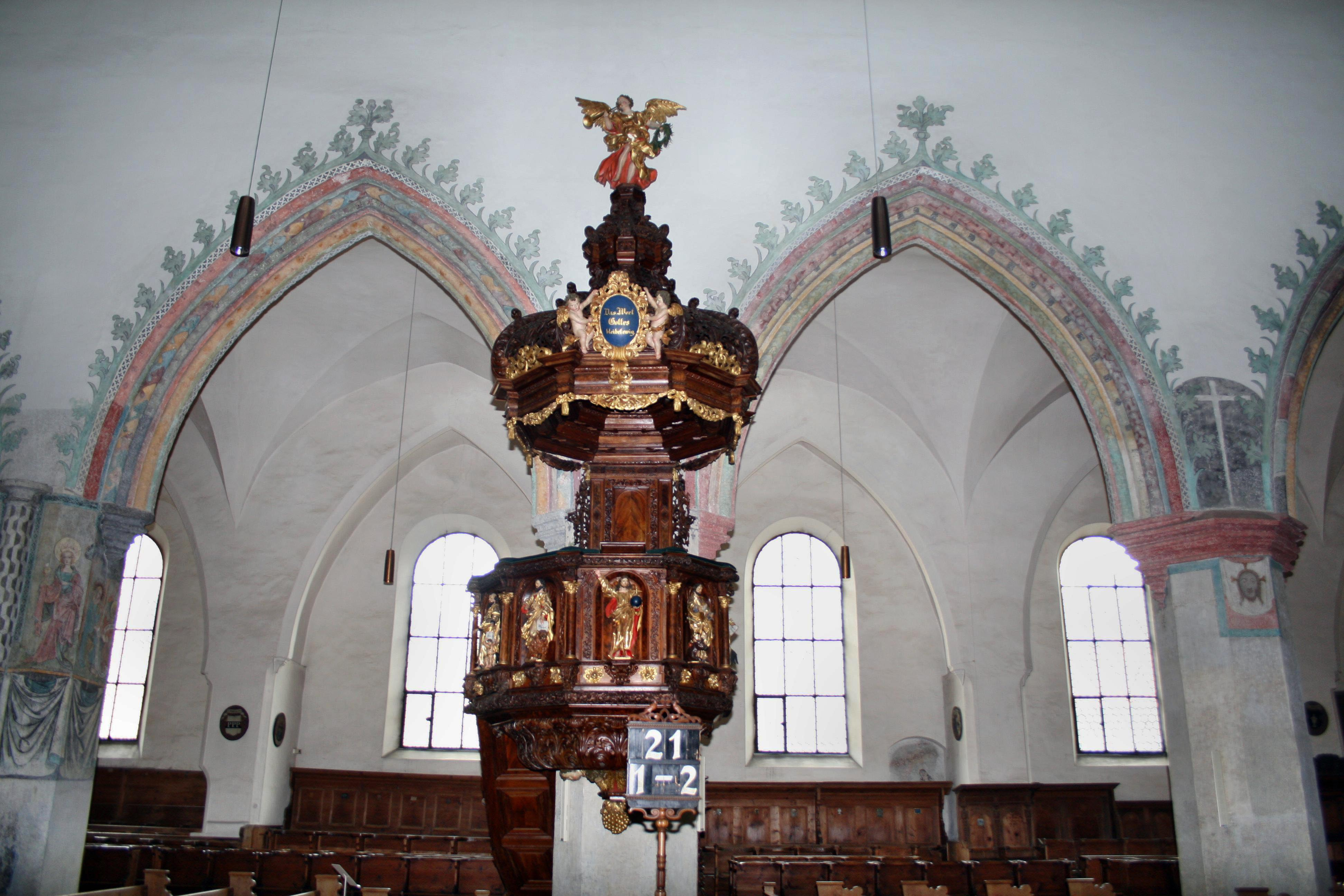
Pulpit

The pulpit in the nave of the basilica was designed by Johann Friedrich Sichelbein and manufactured according to his plans from 1699 to 1700. It represents a joint work of two artists. The carpentry work was done by Georg Rabus, the sculptural elements by Christoph Heinrich Dittmar from Arnstadt. The pulpit was made mainly of walnut with a few golden decorations. The sounding board has the shape of an onion dome and is crowned by an angel playing a trombone. On the outside it is decorated with acanthus leaves. Five statues of Jesus and the four evangelists are set into the pulpit basket in recesses provided for them. At the bottom of the basket, angel heads are grouped around a golden cluster of grapes. The pulpit doorway is decorated with fielding and fruit hangings. Above the door is a figure of John the Baptist. Overall, it is a high work of art of the Upper Swabian Baroque.

==== New sacristy ====
The furnishings of the new sacristy were probably made at the same time as the choir stalls. Accordingly, it is richly decorated with carvings and intarsias. The three-story wall of cupboards continues under the windows in chest-high credence tables. Rich foliage carvings, intarsias, pewter fittings and the green-backed flat cut provide altogether a magnificent late Gothic coniferous woodwork. Heinrich Stark comes into consideration as the master. The baroque table placed in the new sacristy is probably by Johann Christoph Dittmar.

==== Church pews ====
In the nave itself there are no pews worth mentioning. Only in the side chapels of the south nave are there individual late Gothic or Renaissance pieces. On a chair in the Vöhlin chapel there is one of the earliest images of the town coat of arms, carved around 1480.

=== Paintings ===
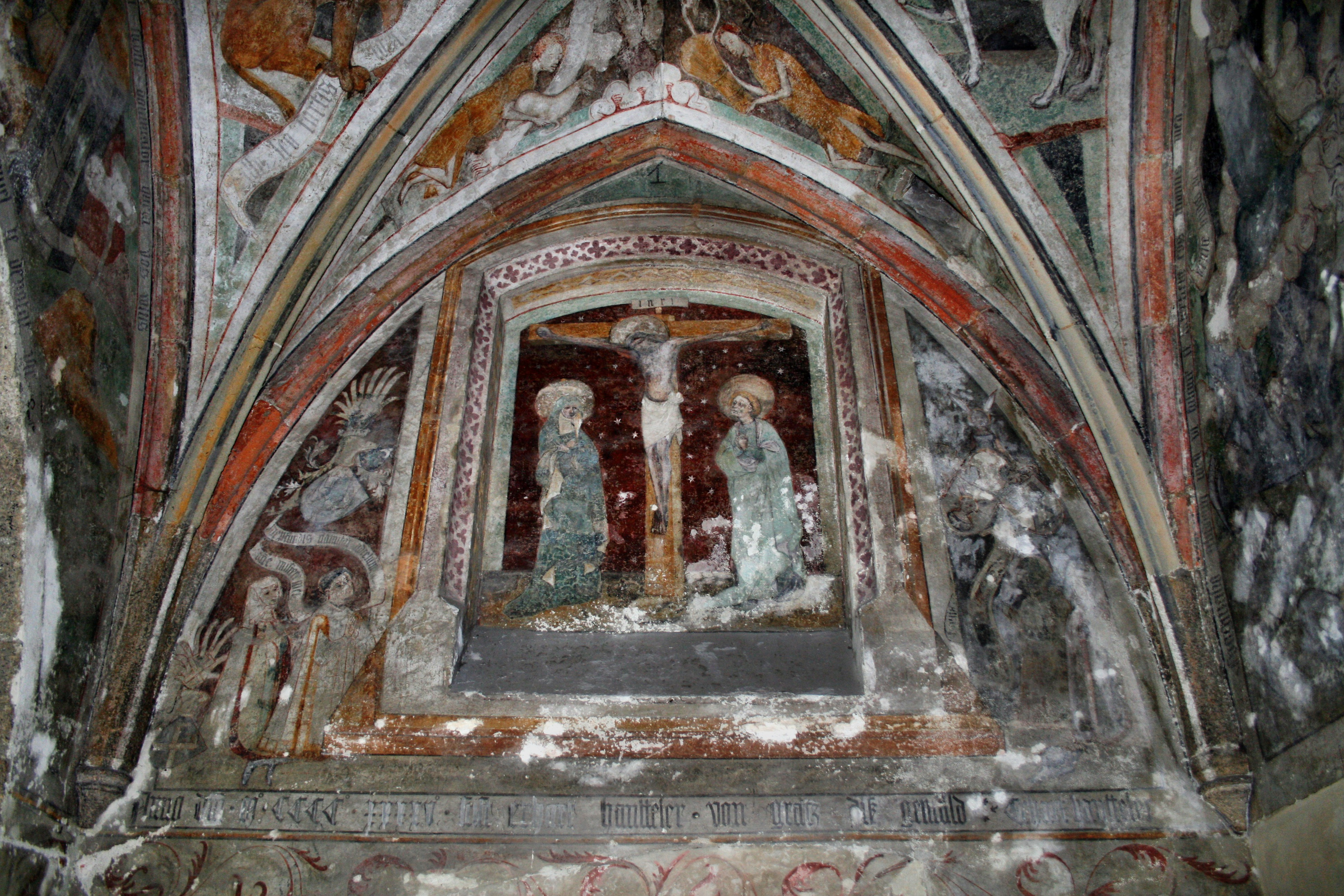
Strigel frescoes in the eastern porch

In the church there are numerous murals and oil paintings. The oldest ones date from the first half of the 15th century, the youngest ones from the 18th century. Many of the murals come from the Memmingen school.

==== Strigel frescoes ====
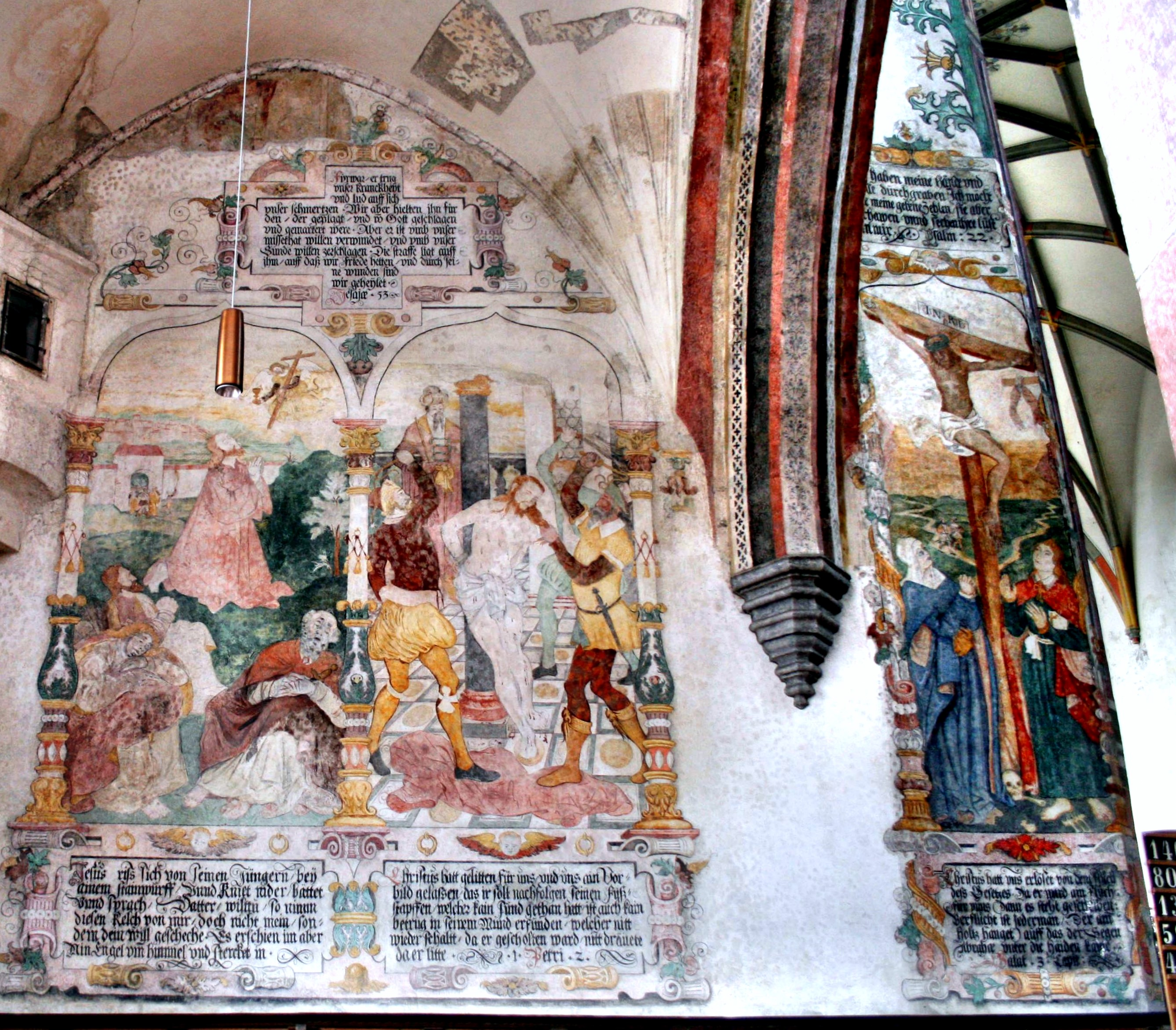
Detail of the Passion cycle, a Sichelbein frescoes in the north nave

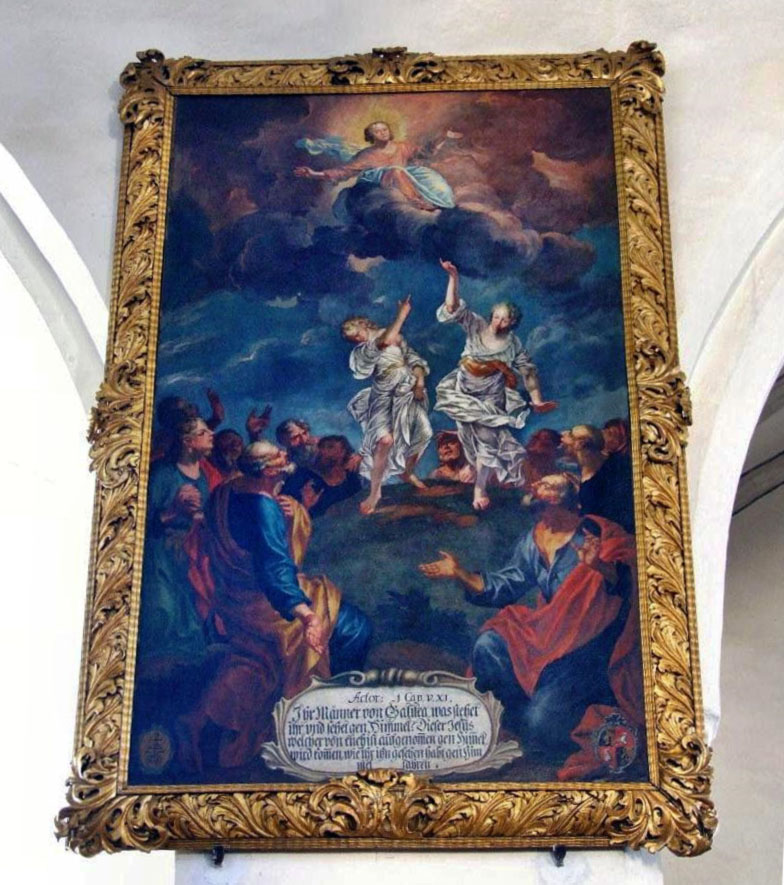
An oil painting of the Sichelbein cycle

Several frescoes in the building were painted by the Strigel family of artists. In the eastern porch of the south nave, Hans Strigel the Elder painted a portrait of the Last Judgment in 1445. The depiction of the Kreuzigung Jesu in the niche in the west wall is also from his hand. Below it are the donors with coats of arms and an inscription on which it can be read that the picture was donated by Erhard Hantteller from Graz. An Annunciation can be seen on the eastern arch field. The ceiling is decorated with the symbols of the four evangelists grouped around the Lamb of God. The prophets Isaiah and Ezekiel are in the eastern stitch-cap panel, Cain fighting with the devil for a sheaf and Abel's offering to God are in the counterpart. Around 1480, Hans Strigel the Younger probably created a Madonnen-Pfeilerfresko in the south nave. The largest surviving fresco work of the artist family is the Zangmeister-Kapelle. An impressive fresco work by Bernhard Strigel was created here around 1510. On the Gothic ceiling it treats the rarely painted themes of the Transfiguration of Jesus and the Binding of Isaac by Abraham. On the walls are depictions of St. Elizabeth visiting Mary and Teufelsaustreibung einer Besessenen performed by St. Eberhard. In addition, throughout the chapel there are smaller frescoes with ornaments, putti and the like. These frescoes were already covered in 1531 during the iconoclasm and could be uncovered again in 1963. Around 1500, frescoes of the Parable of the Ten Virgins were painted in the choir arch. They are stylistically attributed to Bernhard Strigel, the leading master of the Memmingen school.

==== Sichelbein frescoes ====
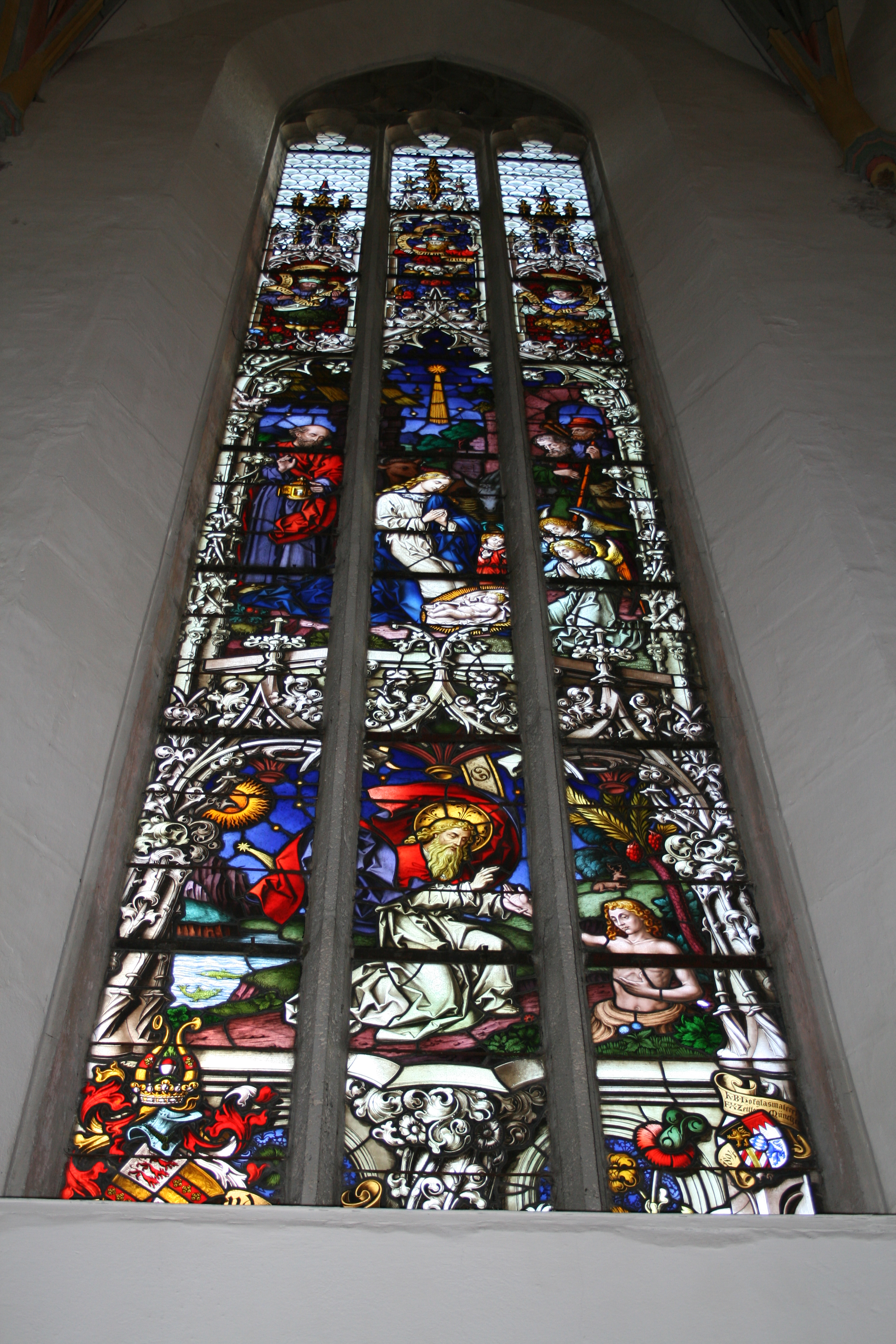
The right choir window with the stained glass from 1894

Probably Caspar Sichelbein the Elder decorated the church in 1587 with ornamental paintings, which were followed a year later by a Passionszyklus. The model was probably Albrecht Dürer's Kleine Passion. Sichelbein had to make some stylistic changes to the paintings because there was not enough space on the walls of the east side of the nave. They were covered over in 1656, uncovered and added to again in 1926 and 1965. Also in 1588, a fresco of the Jüngsten Gerichts was painted on the outer choir arch. This thematically complemented the Passion cycle. It extended 3.80 meters beyond the current apex of the vault. Here, too, it was presumably based on Dürer's Kleine Passion. Today, only a remnant of the fresco remains above the mock vault. The so-called green devil, one of Memmingen's seven landmarks, also disappeared above the mock vault. Fire protection paint, with which the roof truss was protected from fire during the World War II, also destroyed the rest of the green devil.

==== Oil painting ====
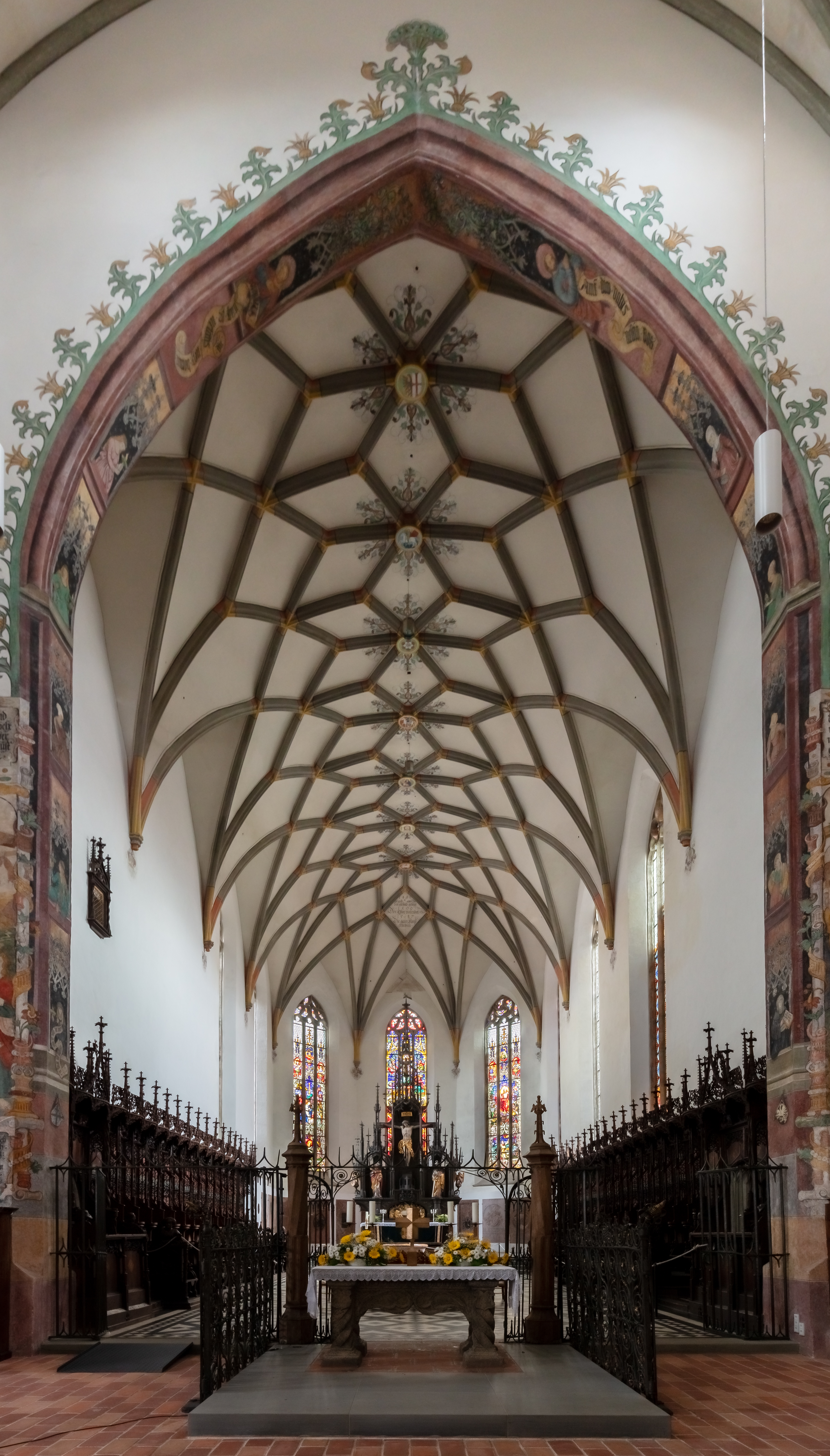
Altar of the cross

There are few oil paintings in the basilica due to the theological view of the Reformation that any church decoration distracts from the spoken word. Johann Friedrich Sichelbein painted eight pictures depicting the life of Jesus. They used to hang on the pillars in the nave. In the course of the interior renovations, they were placed in the chapels of the south nave. They are among the main works of the most important member of the Sichelbein family of artists, who had settled in Memmingen since 1581. Another oil painting is located in the northwest portal. It was painted by the Antwerp-born Abraham del Hel, who later settled in Augsburg, and shows Christ before Pilate.

==== Stained glass ====
The formerly Gothic stained glass windows of the choir and the new sacristy have disappeared. The paintings that can be seen today date from 1894 and are considered outstanding works of art of historicism. They were created by the court glass painter Franz Xaver Zettler from Munich. Only a few Gothic and Renaissance stained glass windows have survived in the chapels.

=== Altar of the Cross ===
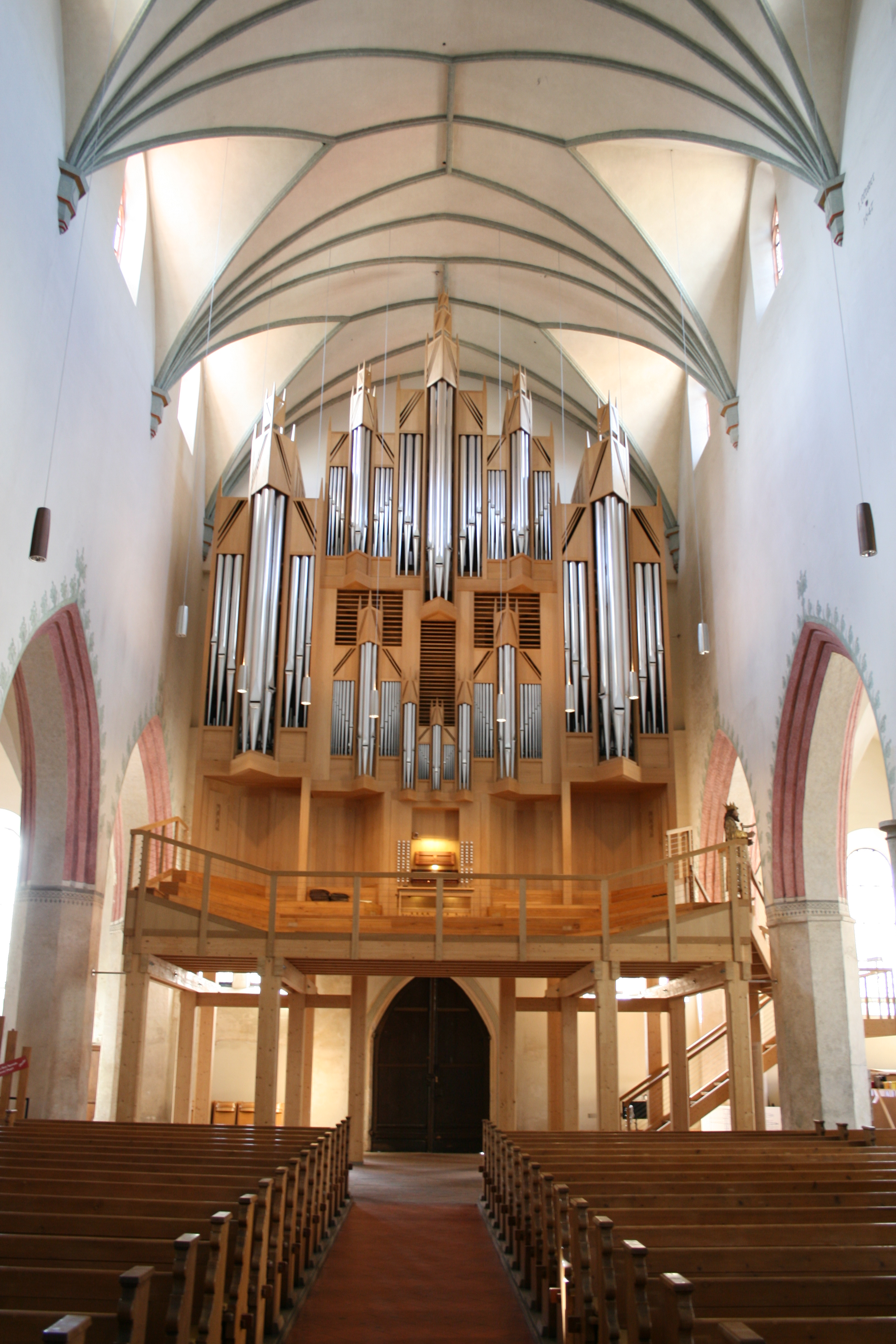
Prospectus of the new organ in St. Martin

The altar of the cross in St. Martin's church is one of the most artistic and earliest such works in Germany. The new theological orientation according to the Zwinglian model made such an altar necessary. It had to replace the previous center of worship, the high altar. Together with this, a total of 21 other altars were removed from the church.

The cross altar was created and erected in 1531 and has Gothic and Renaissance style elements. The columns are strongly worked and have empty escutcheons at the top. The massive table top is supported by cross joints formed of air bladder and decorated with cymatium. It is one of the greatest historical treasures of the former imperial city.

=== Choir grille ===
The bar grille with the doors to the high choir is simple, but the choir grille, which surrounds the altar of the cross, is worth seeing. It dates from 1603 and has spirals, flowers and leaves. To the right of it is said to have been the burial place of the monks of the Antonite abbey. At the beginning of the 19th century there was still a Solnhofen stone with the Antonite T there.

=== Organ ===
The organ has a long tradition in St. Martin. The first organ was mentioned as early as 1453. It had its place on a Schwalbennestempore on the southern high nave wall. In 1528 it was removed for Reformation reasons. In 1597/1598 a new organ was built by Kaspar Sturm and Aaron Ruck. On 21 November 1599 the Fugger court organist Hans Leo Haßler declared the organ a success. The famous work was extensively restored by Joseph Gabler in 1758. The disposition was modernized, Gabler's typical sound elements were inserted. The city archives state: "He repaired the organ well and put it in perfect condition, so that one found a strange pleasure in it." Johann Nepomuk Holzhey last overhauled the organ in 1778. In 1827 the swallow's nest, which had become dilapidated, was replaced in favor of a west matroneum. The organ moved there with it, but it never again achieved the sound it had in the Swallow's Nest. The casing was moved to Illerfeld Castle (Volkratshofen), where the organ's wings are built into the coffered ceiling.

In 1853, when a new organ with a late Gothic case was purchased from the organ-building workshop Walcker and Spaich from Ludwigsburg, organ music in the church again came into the public eye. This instrument was repaired in 1900 by Steinmeyer and extended in 1938 by Paul Ott according to the requirements of the time. This organ had to be abandoned in 1962. An organ from the Walcker company was installed. However, poor workmanship and materials allowed this instrument to last only 36 years.

In 1991, the parish considered a new concept for the organ, since the old one was beyond repair. It provided for the installation of a modern, large organ at the previous location on the west wall. On 8 November 1998 the new organ from Goll was inaugurated. It has 62 organ stops (4,285 pipes) on four manual movements and pedal. The bass-weak acoustics of the 72-meter-long and 20-meter-high church hall made it necessary to make the bass and midrange powerful yet variable. It was decided to install a symphonic organ based on the French model. It takes up the entire west facade from the first gallery. Only the bride's door below is not obstructed. This allows the sound of the organ to unfold freely into the nave. The organ case as well as the gallery are built of untreated oak wood with gothic style elements and combine the old gothic style with the modern architectural style of the late 20th century. The gallery itself is sufficient for about 70 choir members or a comparable instrumental ensemble.

Organ concerts are often held throughout the year. Numerous recordings have been made on the organ. On Saturdays at 11 a.m., the sound of the organ can be experienced during an OrgelKultour tour of the church.

== Turret clock ==
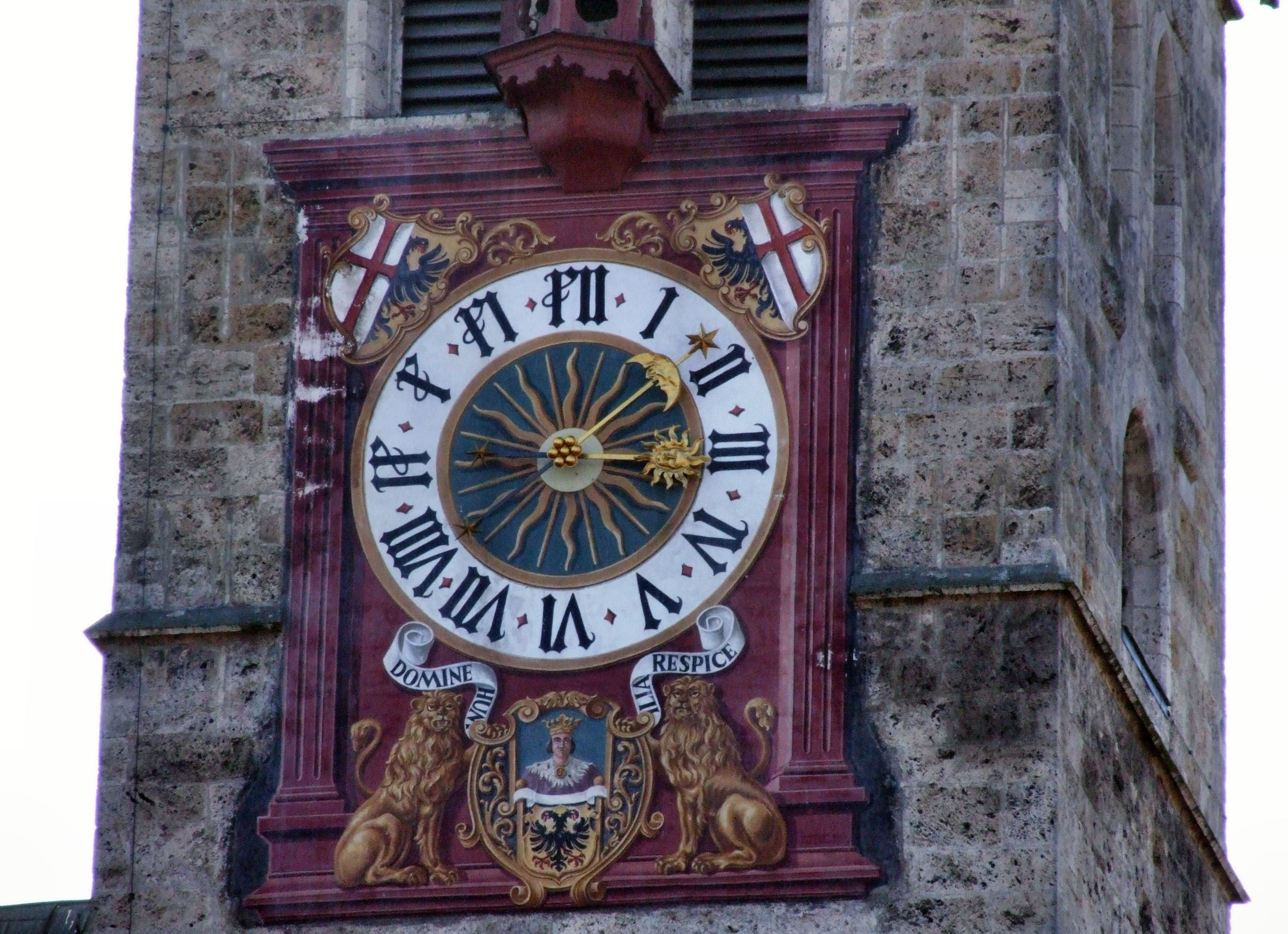
The turret clock of St. Martin

In 1524, one year before the German Peasants' War, the first mechanical watch was put into operation. The first dial was designed by Bernhard Strigel, one of the most outstanding artists of Memmingen. In 1537, during the remodeling of the tower, this painting was revised by Ursus Werlin. It was followed by another revision in 1688, when the baroque forms of the coats of arms and the band with the inscription were added. In 1829 a clock face made of iron sheet was added. Also the damaged parts of the frame were plastered.

Michael Geiger the Elder exposed the framing again in 1906. During the great tower restoration of 1927 under the Ulm Cathedral master builder Karl Wachter, the iron clock face was removed and the complete plaster was chipped off in the process. Prior to this, the original was removed and a new version was made by the Haugg brothers from Ottobeuren. Since this time, it is no longer possible to speak of a painting by Bernhard Strigel, which had to be renewed again in 1966. Today's condition reflects the representation from 1697. The dial is flanked by two Memmingen city coats of arms at the top left. Two lions hold a cartouche with the imperial double-headed eagle as well as the head of a king as the supreme lord of the free imperial city. The depicted king's head, however, was not recognized as such by the population, but was regarded and venerated as the head of "Saint" Hildegard. This is surprising, since Memmingen already converted to the reformed confession in 1530, and after that the veneration of the saint was practically no longer carried out. The painting became one of the seven Memmingen landmarks. On a banner above the lion heads is the imperial motto: "DOMINE HUMILIA RESPICE" (Lord, look at the lowly, Psalm 138:6).

Today's clockwork is a winding clockwork. In 1927, when the tower was handed over, the parish wanted the city to provide a new clock movement without a pendulum to wind it up. The city refused this request, whereupon the parish renounced the transfer of the tower clock and the clockwork remained in the possession of the city. Therefore, still today a municipal servant has to wind the pendulum of the clock every few days.

== Bells ==
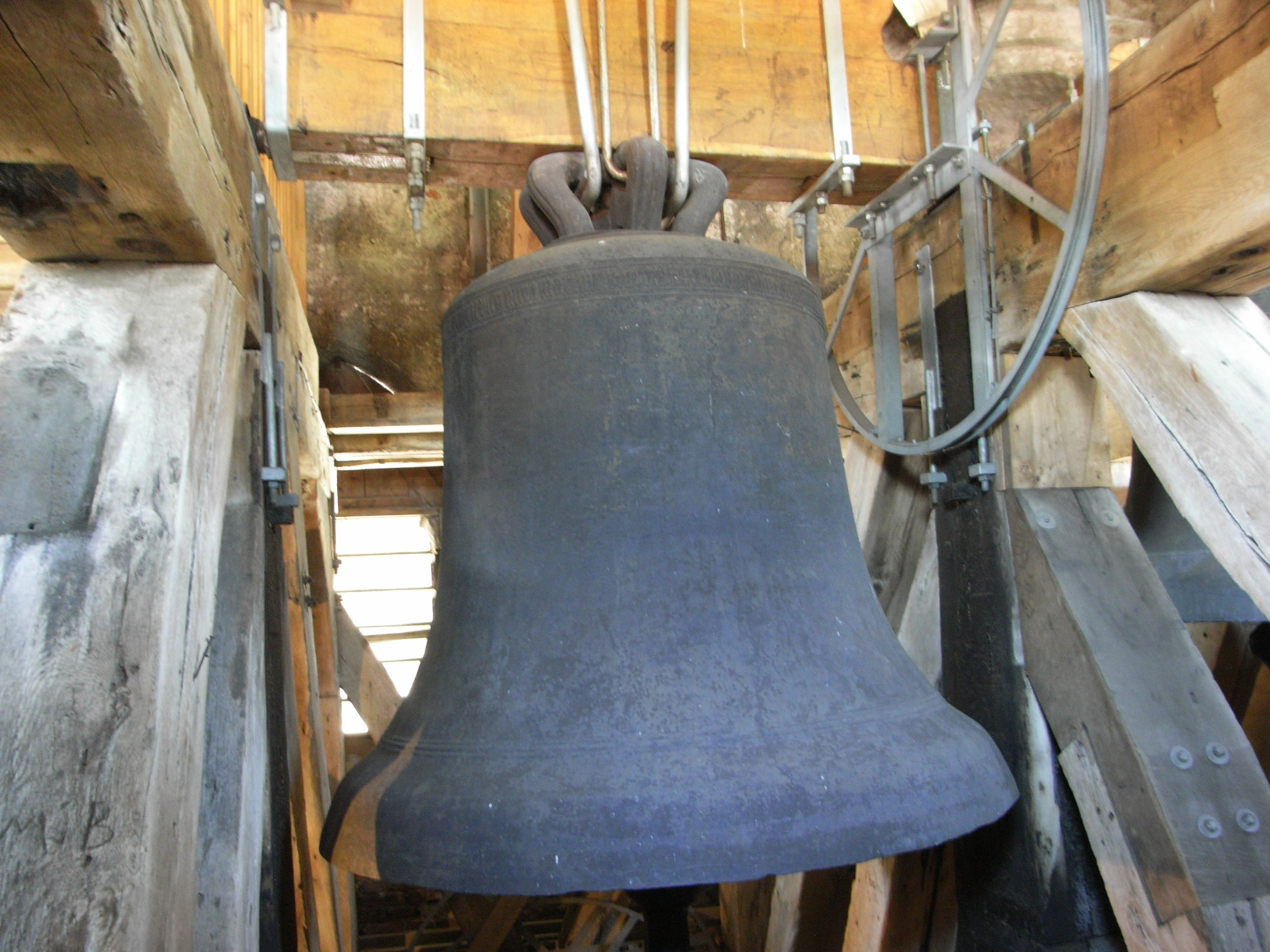
Osannaglocke from 1460

The church has a total of eight bells. Four large bells hang in the Martin Tower in a wooden belfry that is over 600 years old and can be rung. Another four bells hang outside the belfry and cannot be rung. In earlier times, there was another small bell in the belfry that served as a sacristan's bell and signaled to the bell ringer when the large bells had to be struck. The original oldest ringing bell, the Zwölfuhrglocke, was cast in 1415; in 1942 it had to be sent to Hamburg to be melted down and has been lost since then; in 1954 it was replaced by a new casting. Today's oldest bell, the large Osannaglocke, was cast in 1460 by the St. Gallen bell founder Ulrich Snabelburg II, who lived in Memmingen; it was dedicated to St. Martin, St. Mary and St. George, but this was forgotten with the Reformation. The two other ringing bells, the Elfuhr bell and the Marienglocke and more of the ringing bells were cast in 1514.

No.	Name	Casting year	Cast	Weight (kg)	Ø (cm)	Height (cm)	Nominal	Notes, inscription(s)
1	Osannaglocke	1460	Ulrich Snabelburg II	3850	174	144	c^{1}	Inscription: +o • rex • glorie • veni • cvm pace • anno • domini • mo • cccco • lxo • completvm est hoc opvs • in honore • beate marie virginis • martini • et geory • patronorvm • hvivs ecclesie • vo • snabelbvrg / de • s • gallo
2	Elfuhrglocke	1428	Foundry of Conrad Bodenwaltz, Memmingen	1650	129	112	f^{1}	It always strikes at eleven o'clock.
3	Marienglocke	1514	Martin Kisling and Hans Folmer II, Biberach Hut	450	87	73	as^{1}	Colloquially also referred to as "horse tail". Inscription: AVE MARIA GRATIA PLENA, DOMINUS TECUM ANNO MCC-CCCXIIII und ihesus • maria • anna • vnd • das • vierdig • hailtum • lucas • marcus • mathevs • iohannes • sancte • martine • avse • maria • anno • dni • mccccxx • viii.
4	Zwölfuhrglocke	1954		650			b^{1}	Is also called the Gefallenen-Gedächtnis-Glocke. Always strikes at 12 o'clock

Outside the Martin tower hang four other bells, which are not part of the ringing.

- The hour striking bell is located in a small bay window above the tower clock dial. It was cast in 1573 and broke during the bombardment of the city by the imperial army during the Thirty Years' War in 1632. Leonhard Ernst II cast it again in 1644. It strikes every hour of the day except the eleventh and twelfth.
- The town fire bell hangs above the Türmerstube outside and was cast in 1728 by Johann Melchior Ernst. It was struck during fires within the city, weighs 2.5 hundredweights, has a diameter of 48 and a height of 35.5 centimeters. The inscription reads "DEO GLORIA ANNO 1728".
- The quarter hour bell was cast in 1990 as a replacement for the arm sin bell stolen from the scaffolding in 1986. It hangs above a window of the Türmerstube. In the past, the bell with its shrill sound accompanied those sentenced to death to the place of execution. In more recent times it struck the quarter hours. It was engraved with "Hilf Maria". It was the oldest preserved bell in the town. It has been lost since it was stolen.
- The country fire bell is placed in the small ridge turret above the southeast balcony. It was cast in 1966. In the past, it was struck in case of fires in the Protestant surrounding countryside. If, on the other hand, there was a fire in the Catholic surrounding area, the city fire department was not called to help.

== Use ==
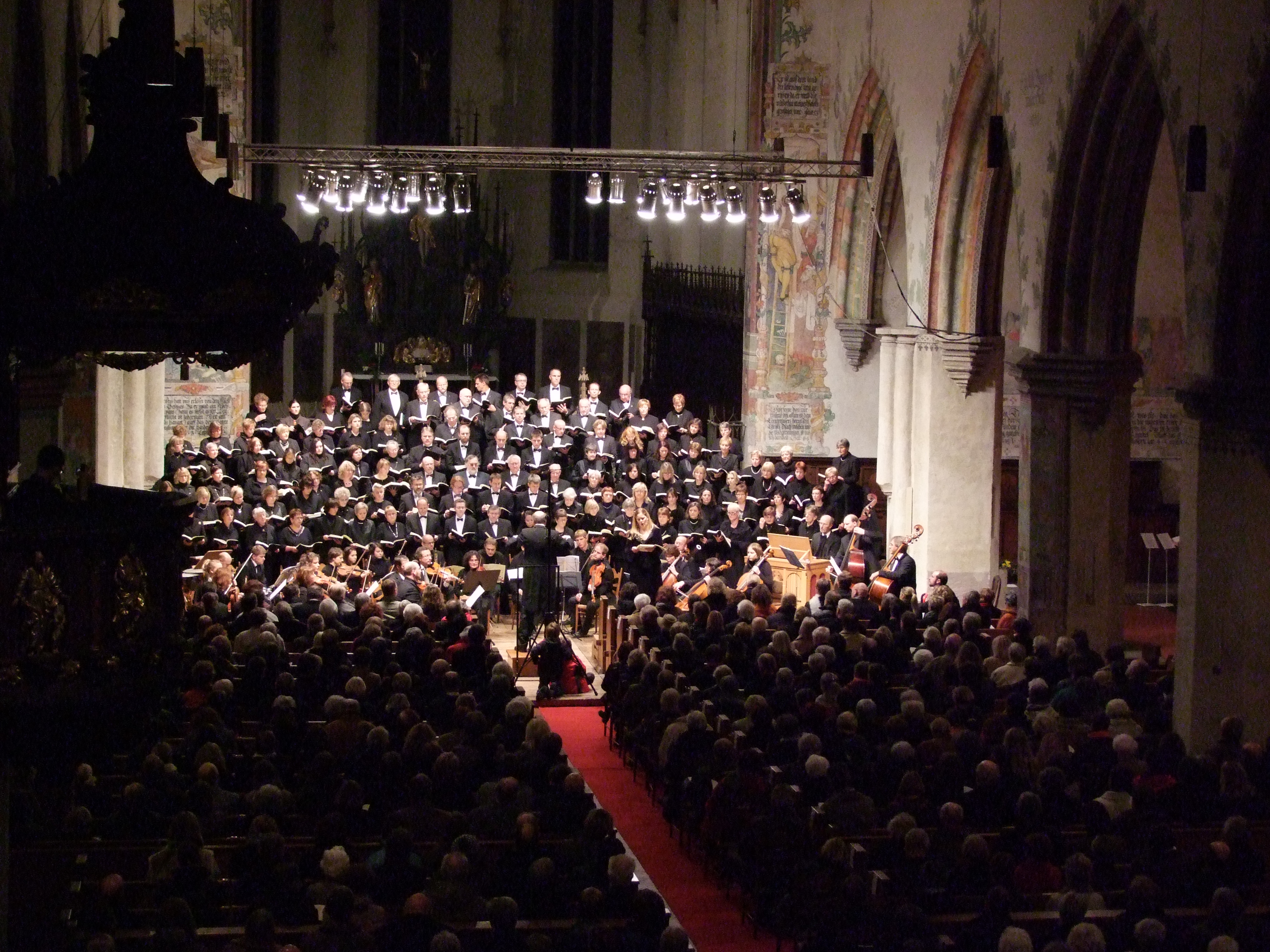
Oratorio 2009

The church was probably founded as a royal court church of the Guelphs. It was not until 1214 that the patronage was handed over to the Antonines, who set up their preceptory diagonally opposite at the city wall. Since then, the church was actually the monastery church of the Antonines. Since the people of Memmingen always shared its use and paid for the renovations, the church gradually became the town parish church. During the Reformation, the Antonines were expelled in 1531, and the final replacement of the monastery did not take place until 1562. Since that time, the church has been a purely city parish church.

Today, the church is the deanery church of the Memmingen deanery. The dean is also the holder of the first parish position in St. Martin. church services are usually held every Sunday. Tours of the church are conducted every Saturday at noon with organ accompaniment. The church hall also serves as a concert hall for organ recitals, oratorios, vocal concerts, and smaller ensembles. Tours of the tower take place daily at 3 p.m. from May to October.

== Bibliography ==
- Evangelisch-lutherisches Pfarramt St. Martin, Memmingen, ed. (2006), St. Martin und Kinderlehrkirche • Memmingen, Memmingen: Memminger Mediencentrum AG
- Historischer Verein Memmingen e. V., ed. (2007), 500 Jahre Chorgestühl in St. Martin zu Memmingen, Memmingen: Memminger Mediencentrum AG, ISSN 0539-2896
- Historischer Verein Memmingen e. V., ed. (2017), Kirche St. Martin Memmingen, Memmingen: Memminger Mediencentrum AG, ISSN 0539-2896
