= Lachen =

Lachen can refer to:

== Places ==
- Lachen, Switzerland, a municipality of the canton of Schwyz
  - Lachen railway station in the municipality of Lachen, canton of Schwyz
- Lachen, Germany, a municipality of Bavaria
- Lachen, Sikkim – a town in India
- Lachen River, in India

== Other ==
- The German and Dutch words for laughing
