= Memmingerberg =

- Municipality
- Coat of arms

- Location of Memmingerberg within Unterallgäu district
- Interactive map of Memmingerberg
- Location within Germany Location within Bavaria
- Coordinates: 47°59′N 10°13′E
- Country: Germany
- State: Bavaria
- Admin. region: Schwaben
- District: Unterallgäu
- Municipal assoc.: Memmingerberg

Government
  - Mayor (2020–26): Alwin Lichtensteiger (CSU)

Area
  - Total: 6.09 km^{2} (2.35 sq mi)
- Elevation: 603 m (1,978 ft)

Population (2025-12-31)
  - Total: 2,951
  - Density: 485/km^{2} (1,260/sq mi)
- Time zone: UTC+01:00 (CET)
  - Summer (DST): UTC+02:00 (CEST)
- Postal codes: 87766
- Dialling codes: 08331
- Vehicle registration: MN
- Website: www.memmingerberg.de

Memmingerberg is a municipality in the district of Unterallgäu in Bavaria, Germany. The town is the headquarters of a municipal association with Benningen, Holzgünz, Lachen, Bavaria, Trunkelsberg and Ungerhausen.
