= Trunkelsberg =

- Municipality
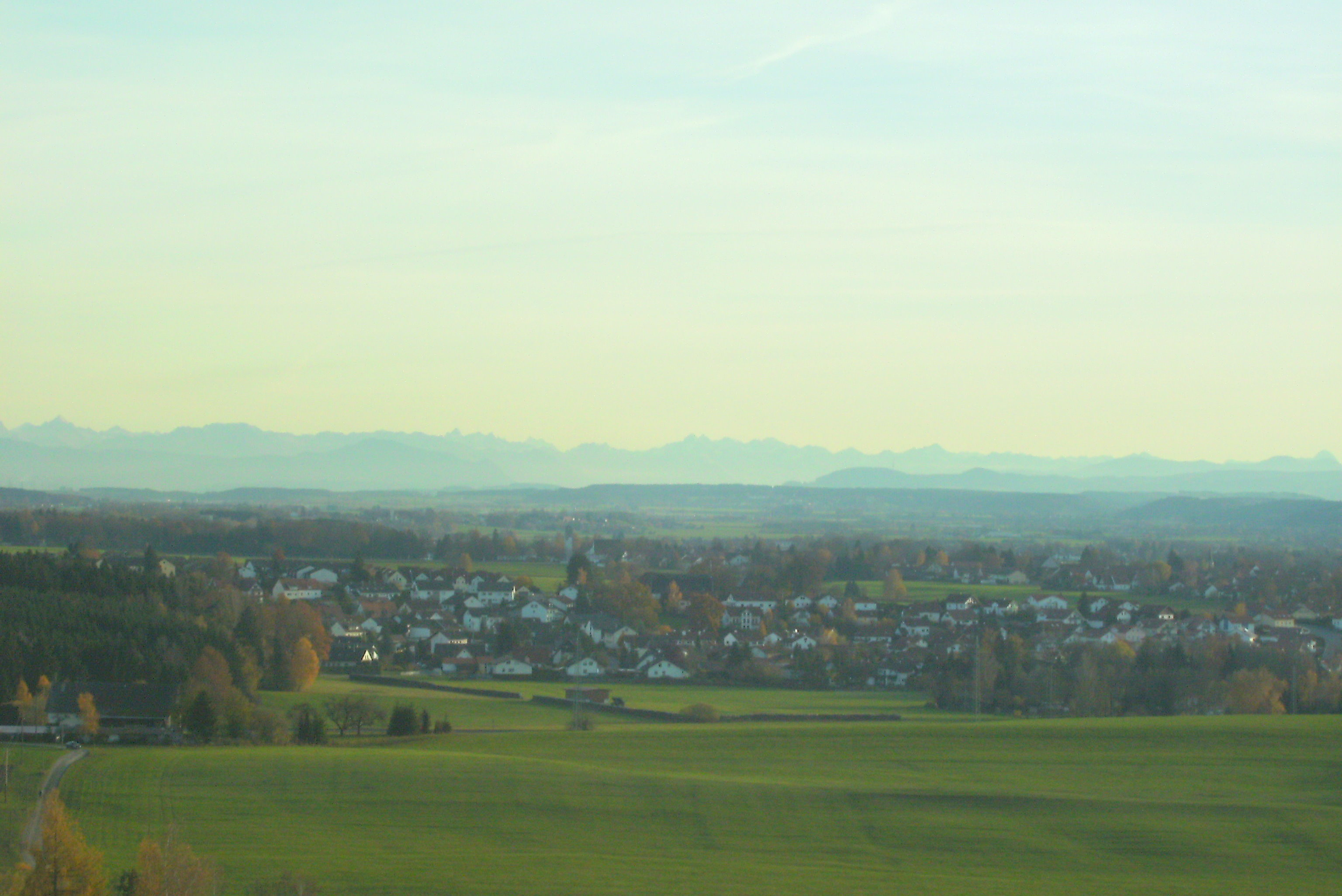
- Trunkelsberg

- Coat of arms

- Location of Trunkelsberg within Unterallgäu district
- Interactive map of Trunkelsberg
- Location within Germany Location within Bavaria
- Coordinates: 48°0′N 10°13′E
- Country: Germany
- State: Bavaria
- Admin. region: Schwaben
- District: Unterallgäu
- Municipal assoc.: Memmingerberg

Government
  - Mayor (2020–26): Roman Albrecht (Greens)

Area
  - Total: 1.90 km^{2} (0.73 sq mi)
- Elevation: 625 m (2,051 ft)

Population (2025-12-31)
  - Total: 1,730
  - Density: 911/km^{2} (2,360/sq mi)
- Time zone: UTC+01:00 (CET)
  - Summer (DST): UTC+02:00 (CEST)
- Postal codes: 87779
- Dialling codes: 08331
- Vehicle registration: MN

Trunkelsberg is a municipality in the district of Unterallgäu in Bavaria, Germany. The town has a municipal association with Memmingerberg.
