= Ungerhausen =

- Municipality
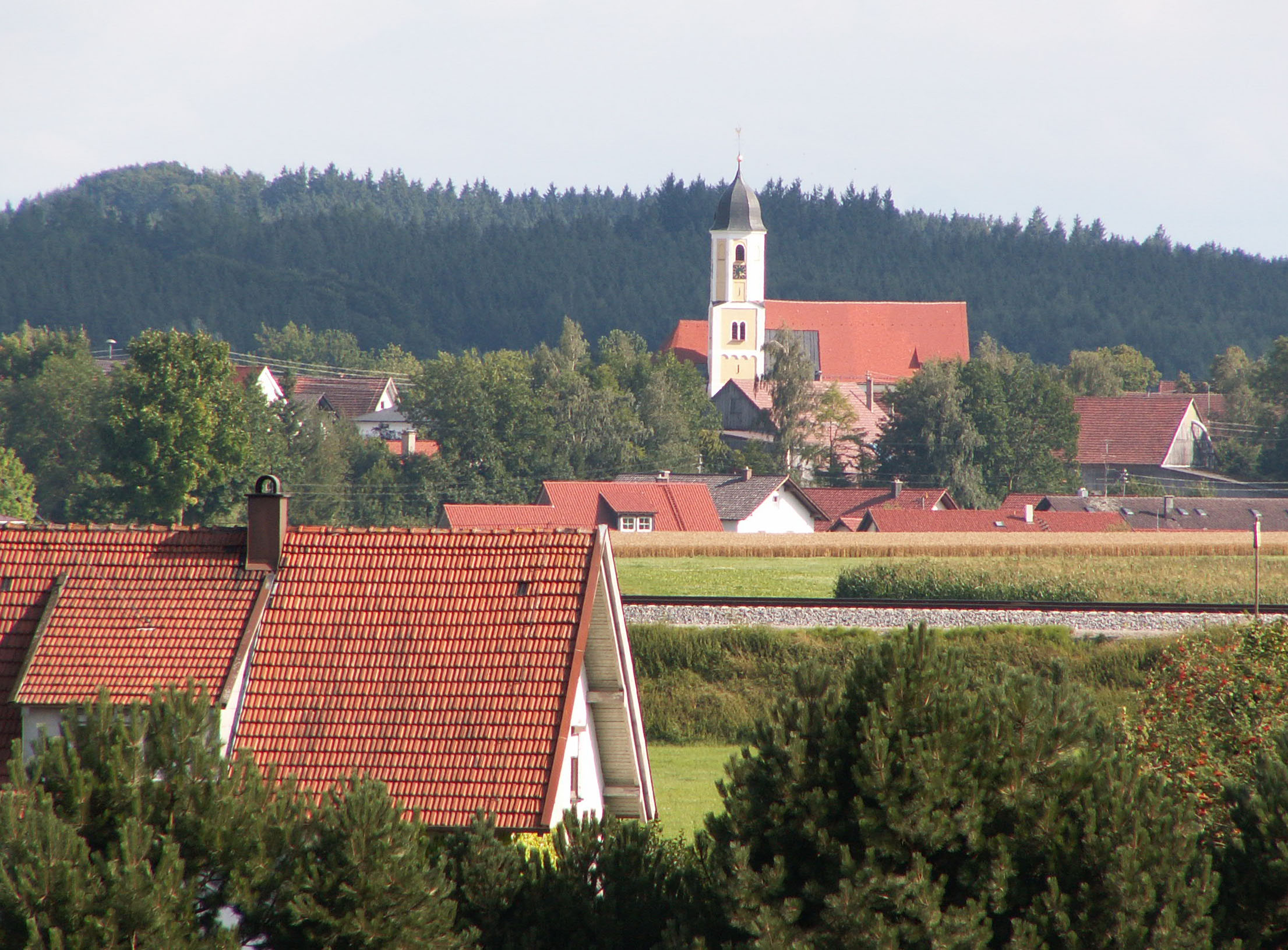
- Ungerhausen seen from the north

- Coat of arms

- Location of Ungerhausen within Unterallgäu district
- Interactive map of Ungerhausen
- Location within Germany Location within Bavaria
- Coordinates: 48°1′N 10°16′E
- Country: Germany
- State: Bavaria
- Admin. region: Schwaben
- District: Unterallgäu
- Municipal assoc.: Memmingerberg

Government
  - Mayor (2020–26): Josef Fickler (FW)

Area
  - Total: 7.02 km^{2} (2.71 sq mi)
- Elevation: 615 m (2,018 ft)

Population (2025-12-31)
  - Total: 1,114
  - Density: 159/km^{2} (411/sq mi)
- Time zone: UTC+01:00 (CET)
  - Summer (DST): UTC+02:00 (CEST)
- Postal codes: 87781
- Dialling codes: 08393
- Vehicle registration: MN
- Website: www.ungerhausen.de

Ungerhausen is a municipality in the district of Unterallgäu in Bavaria, Germany. The town has a municipal association with Memmingerberg.
