= Memmingerberg (Verwaltungsgemeinschaft) =

- Verwaltungsgemeinschaft
- Location of Memmingerberg within Unterallgäu district
- Interactive map of Memmingerberg
- Location within Germany Location within Bavaria
- Coordinates: 47°59′N 10°13′E
- Country: Germany
- State: Bavaria
- Admin. region: Swabia
- District: Unterallgäu
- Seat: Memmingerberg
- Subdivisions: 6 municipalities

Area
  - Total: 51.6 km^{2} (19.9 sq mi)

Population (2025-12-31)
  - Total: 10,994
  - Density: 213/km^{2} (552/sq mi)
- Time zone: UTC+01:00 (CET)
  - Summer (DST): UTC+02:00 (CEST)
- Website: www.vg-memmingerberg.de

Memmingerberg is a Verwaltungsgemeinschaft (municipal association) in the district of Unterallgäu in Bavaria, Germany. Its seat is in Memmingerberg. It consists of the following municipalities:

1. Benningen
2. Holzgünz
3. Lachen
4. Memmingerberg
5. Trunkelsberg
6. Ungerhausen
