= Holzgünz =

- Municipality
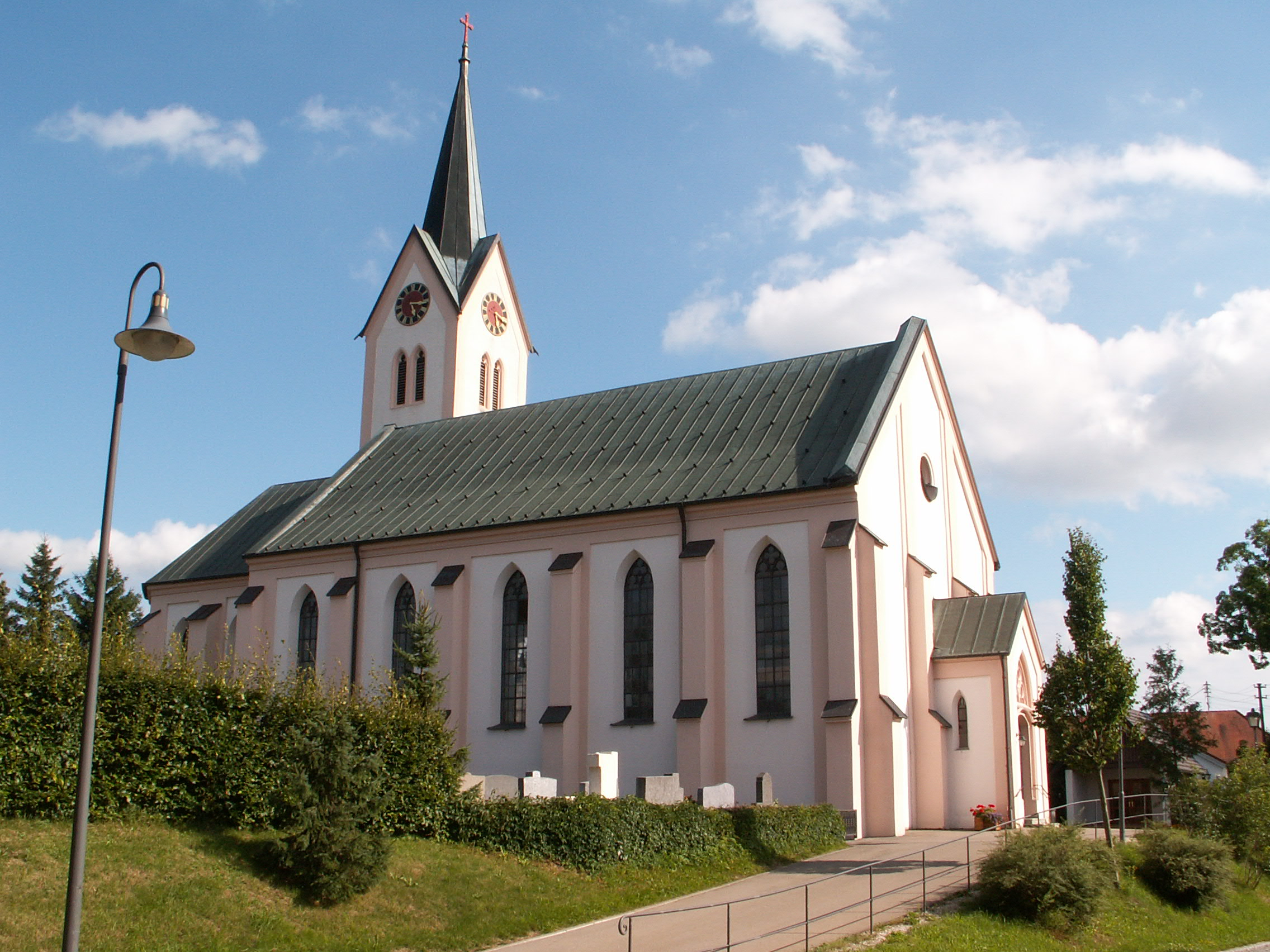
- Church in Holzgünz

- Coat of arms

- Location of Holzgünz within Unterallgäu district
- Interactive map of Holzgünz
- Location within Germany Location within Bavaria
- Coordinates: 48°1′N 10°16′E
- Country: Germany
- State: Bavaria
- Admin. region: Schwaben
- District: Unterallgäu
- Municipal assoc.: Memmingerberg

Government
  - Mayor (2020–26): Franz Rolla

Area
  - Total: 12.10 km^{2} (4.67 sq mi)
- Elevation: 602 m (1,975 ft)

Population (2025-12-31)
  - Total: 1,378
  - Density: 113.9/km^{2} (295.0/sq mi)
- Time zone: UTC+01:00 (CET)
  - Summer (DST): UTC+02:00 (CEST)
- Postal codes: 87752
- Dialling codes: 08393
- Vehicle registration: MN
- Website: www.holzguenz.de

Holzgünz is a municipality in the district of Unterallgäu in Bavaria, Germany. The town has a municipal association with Memmingerberg.
