= Benningen =

- Municipality
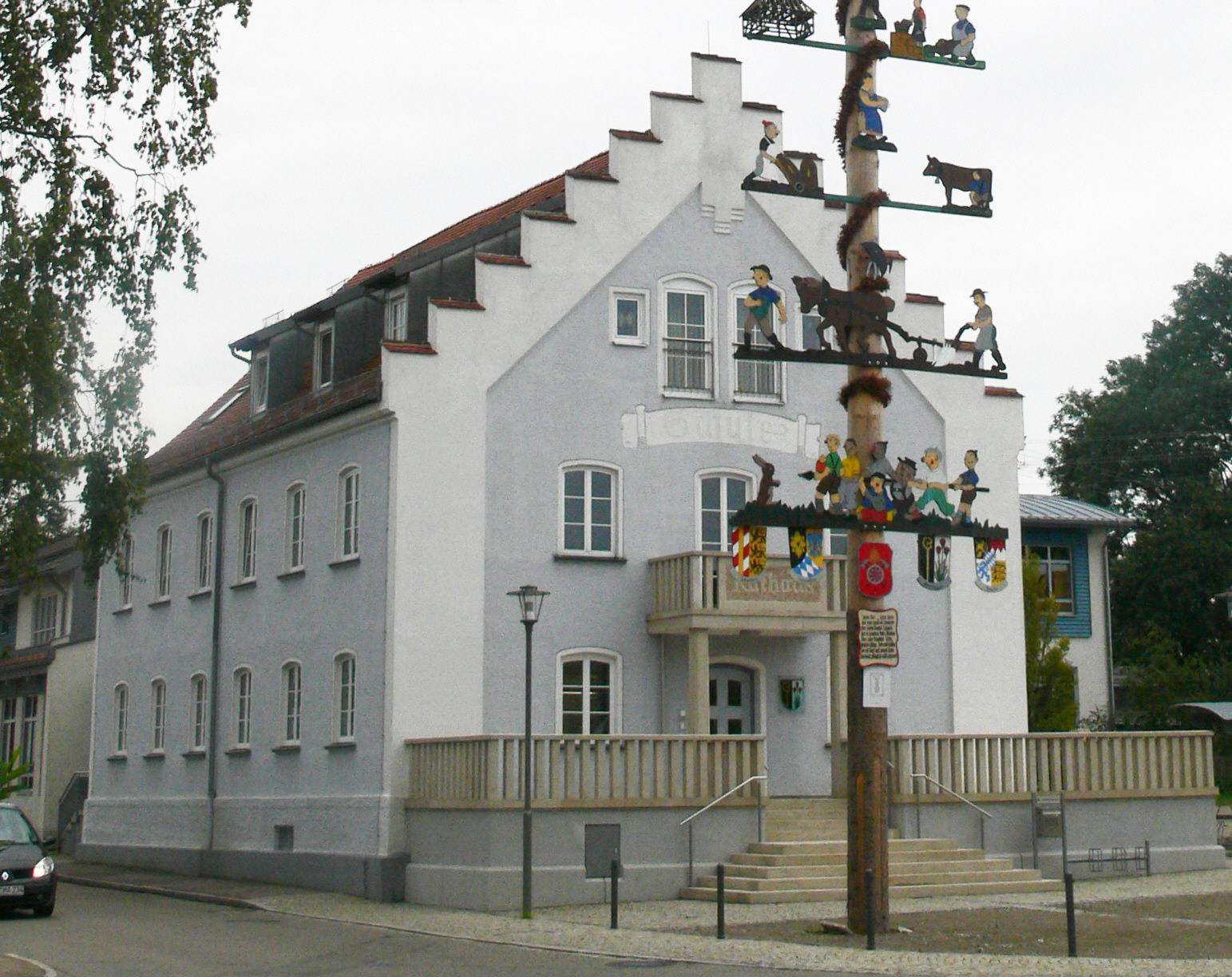
- Town hall

- Coat of arms

- Location of Benningen within Unterallgäu district
- Interactive map of Benningen
- Location within Germany Location within Bavaria
- Coordinates: 47°58′N 10°13′E
- Country: Germany
- State: Bavaria
- Admin. region: Schwaben
- District: Unterallgäu
- Municipal assoc.: Memmingerberg

Government
  - Mayor (2020–26): Martin Osterrieder

Area
  - Total: 11.17 km^{2} (4.31 sq mi)
- Elevation: 601 m (1,972 ft)

Population (2025-12-31)
  - Total: 2,124
  - Density: 190.2/km^{2} (492.5/sq mi)
- Time zone: UTC+01:00 (CET)
  - Summer (DST): UTC+02:00 (CEST)
- Postal codes: 87734
- Dialling codes: 08331
- Vehicle registration: MN
- Website: www.benningen-allgaeu.de

Benningen (German pronunciation: [ˈbɛnɪŋən]) is a municipality in the district of Unterallgäu in Bavaria, Germany. The town has a municipal association with Memmingerberg.

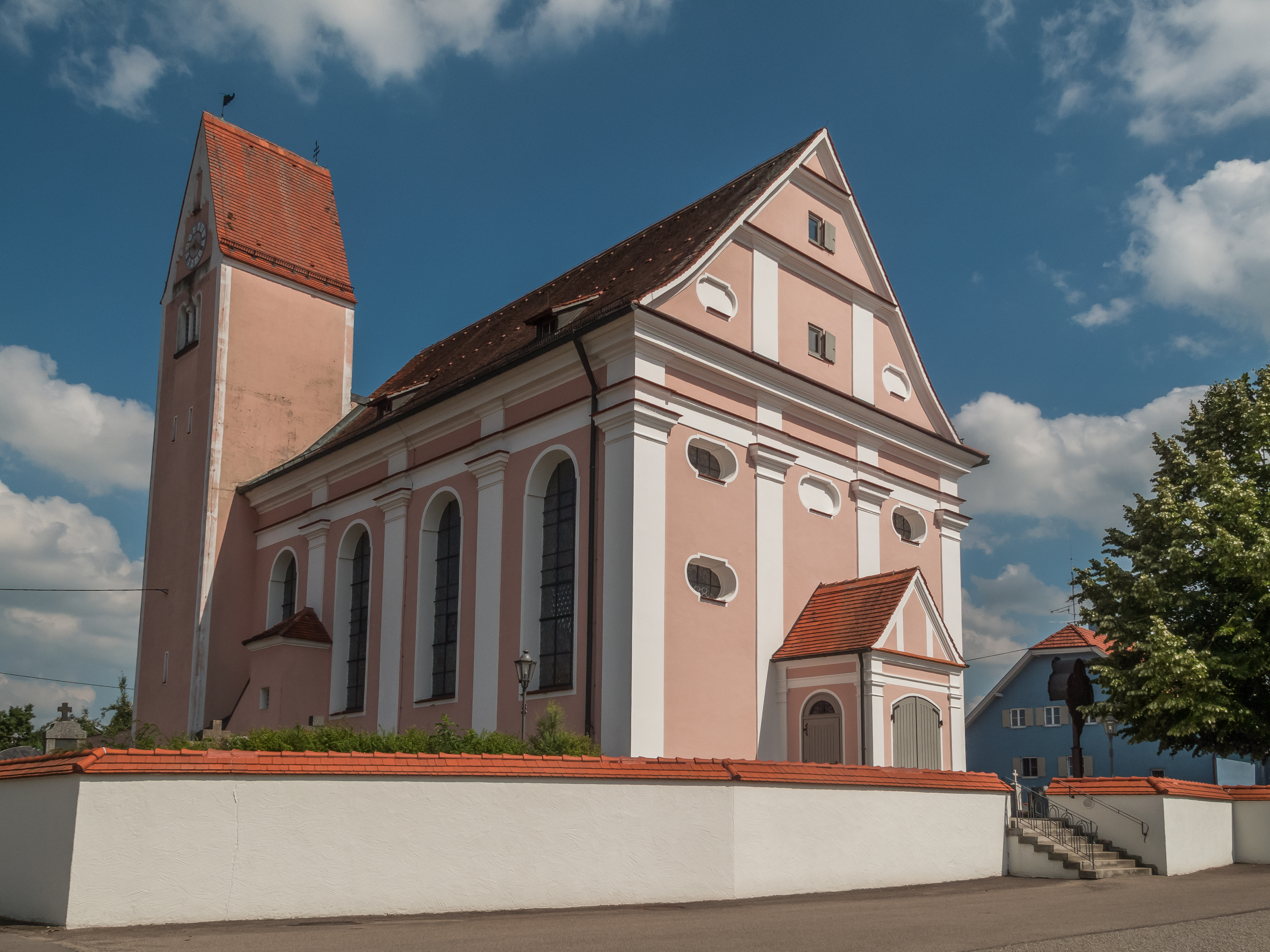
The Catholic parish Church of Saints Peter and Paul
