= Lachen, Bavaria =

Lachen
- Municipality
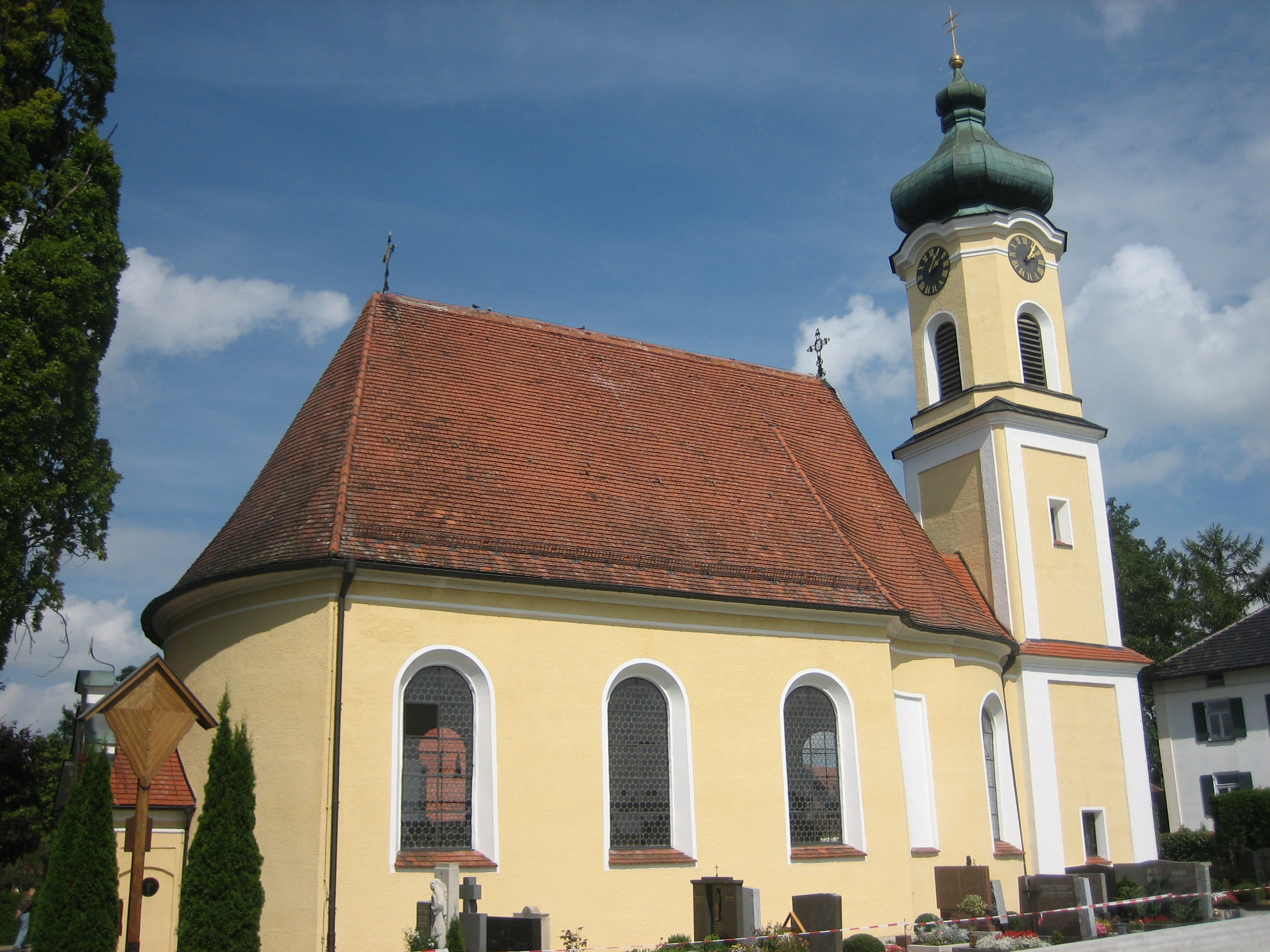
- Saint Afra Church

- Coat of arms

- Location of Lachen within Unterallgäu district
- Interactive map of Lachen
- Location within Germany Location within Bavaria
- Coordinates: 47°57′N 10°14′E
- Country: Germany
- State: Bavaria
- Admin. region: Schwaben
- District: Unterallgäu
- Municipal assoc.: Memmingerberg
- Subdivisions: 7

Government
  - Mayor (2020–26): Josef Diebolder (FW)

Area
  - Total: 13.31 km^{2} (5.14 sq mi)
- Elevation: 651 m (2,136 ft)

Population (2025-12-31)
  - Total: 1,697
  - Density: 127.5/km^{2} (330.2/sq mi)
- Time zone: UTC+01:00 (CET)
  - Summer (DST): UTC+02:00 (CEST)
- Postal codes: 87760
- Dialling codes: 08331, 08332
- Vehicle registration: MN
- Website: www.gemeinde-lachen.de

Lachen (German pronunciation: [ˈlaxn̩]) is a municipality in the district of Unterallgäu in Bavaria, Germany. The town has a municipal association with Memmingerberg.

== Notable people ==
- Johannes Zick (1702 in Lachen – 1762), a German painter of frescoes in southern Germany, active during the Baroque period
- Oberleutnant Stefan Kirmaier (1889 in Lachen - 1916), a World War I German flying ace
