= Babenhausen =

Babenhausen may refer to:

- Babenhausen, Hesse, city in the Darmstadt-Dieburg district, Hesse, Germany
- Babenhausen, Bavaria, municipality in the Unterallgäu district, Bavaria, Germany
