= Ettringen =

Ettringen may refer to:

- Ettringen, Bavaria
- Ettringen, Mayen-Koblenz

== See also ==
- Ettlingen, a city in Baden-Württemberg, Germany
- Ettingen, a village in Basel-Land, Switzerland
