= Breitenbrunn =

Breitenbrunn may refer to:

- Breitenbrunn am Neusiedler See, in Burgenland, Austria
- Breitenbrunn, Upper Palatinate, in the district of Neumarkt, Bavaria, Germany
- Breitenbrunn, Swabia, in the district of Unterallgäu, Bavaria, Germany
- Breitenbrunn, Saxony, in the district of Aue-Schwarzenberg, Saxony, Germany
