= Boos, Bavaria =

Boos
- Municipality
- Coat of arms

- Location of Boos within Unterallgäu district
- Interactive map of Boos
- Location within Germany Location within Bavaria
- Coordinates: 48°4′N 10°12′E
- Country: Germany
- State: Bavaria
- Admin. region: Schwaben
- District: Unterallgäu
- Municipal assoc.: Boos

Government
  - Mayor (2020–26): Helmut Erben

Area
  - Total: 17.59 km^{2} (6.79 sq mi)
- Elevation: 570 m (1,870 ft)

Population (2025-12-31)
  - Total: 2,384
  - Density: 135.5/km^{2} (351.0/sq mi)
- Time zone: UTC+01:00 (CET)
  - Summer (DST): UTC+02:00 (CEST)
- Postal codes: 87737
- Dialling codes: 08335
- Vehicle registration: MN
- Website: www.vg-boos.de

Boos (German pronunciation: [boːs]) is a municipality in the district of Unterallgäu in Bavaria in Germany. The town is the seat of the municipal association with Fellheim, Heimertingen, Niederrieden and Pleß.
