= Unterallgäu =

Coordinates: 48°00′N 10°30′E

- District
- Flag Coat of arms
- Country: Germany
- State: Bavaria
- Adm. region: Swabia
- Capital: Mindelheim

Government
  - District admin.: Alex Eder (FW)

Area
  - Total: 1,229.2 km^{2} (474.6 sq mi)

Population (31 December 2025)
  - Total: 147,386
  - Density: 119.90/km^{2} (310.55/sq mi)
- Time zone: UTC+01:00 (CET)
  - Summer (DST): UTC+02:00 (CEST)
- Vehicle registration: MN
- Website: www.unterallgaeu.de

Unterallgäu (German pronunciation: [ˈʊntɐˌʔalɡɔʏ], lit. 'Lower Allgäu') is a Landkreis (district) in Swabia, Bavaria, Germany. Neighboring districts are (from the north clockwise) Neu-Ulm, Günzburg, Augsburg, Ostallgäu, Oberallgäu, and the districts Ravensburg and Biberach in Baden-Württemberg. The district-free city Memmingen in the west of the district is nearly surrounded by the district. The capital of the district is Mindelheim.

== Geography ==
The district is located in the Allgäu, the northern foothills of the Alps. The river Iller forms part of the western boundary of the district.

== History ==
The district was created July 1, 1972 by merging the previous districts Mindelheim and Memmingen. Mindelheim is the administrative seat of the new district.

== Partnerships ==
The district started a partnership with the Polish Gostyn County in 2001.

== Coat of arms ==
The rose in the left of the coat of arms is the symbol of the abbey of Ottobeuren, which ruled the southern part of the district. The fleur-de-lis in the right stands for the Fugger family, who owned several estates in the district. To the bottom are the Bavarian lozenges, to symbolize that the area became part of Bavaria in 1814.

== Towns and municipalities ==
Clickable map of towns and municipalities in the district

Towns

1. Bad Wörishofen
2. Mindelheim

Märkte

1. Markt Rettenbach
2. Markt Wald
3. Tussenhausen

Municipalities

1. Buxheim
2. Ettringen
3. Sontheim

Verwaltungsgemeinschaften
1. Babenhausen; 1. Babenhausen^{1,3}; 2. Egg an der Günz; 3. Kettershausen; 4. Kirchhaslach; 5. Oberschönegg; 6. Winterrieden; 2. Bad Grönenbach; 1. Bad Grönenbach^{1,3}; 2. Wolfertschwenden; 3. Woringen	3. Boos; 1. Boos^{1}; 2. Fellheim; 3. Heimertingen; 4. Niederrieden; 5. Pleß; 4. Dirlewang; 1. Apfeltrach; 2. Dirlewang^{1,3}; 3. Stetten; 4. Unteregg	5. Erkheim; 1. Erkheim^{1,3}; 2. Kammlach; 3. Lauben; 4. Westerheim; 6. Illerwinkel; 1. Kronburg; 2. Legau^{1,3}; 3. Lautrach; 7. Kirchheim in Schwaben; 1. Eppishausen; 2. Kirchheim in Schwaben^{1,3}	8. Memmingerberg; 1. Benningen; 2. Holzgünz; 3. Lachen; 4. Memmingerberg^{1}; 5. Trunkelsberg; 6. Ungerhausen; 9. Ottobeuren; 1. Böhen; 2. Hawangen; 3. Ottobeuren^{1,3}	10. Pfaffenhausen; 1. Breitenbrunn; 2. Oberrieden; 3. Pfaffenhausen^{1,3}; 4. Salgen; 11. Türkheim; 1. Amberg; 2. Rammingen; 3. Türkheim^{1,3}; 4. Wiedergeltingen
^{1}seat of the Verwaltungsgemeinschaft; ^{2}town; ^{3}Markt
