= Niederrieden =

- Municipality
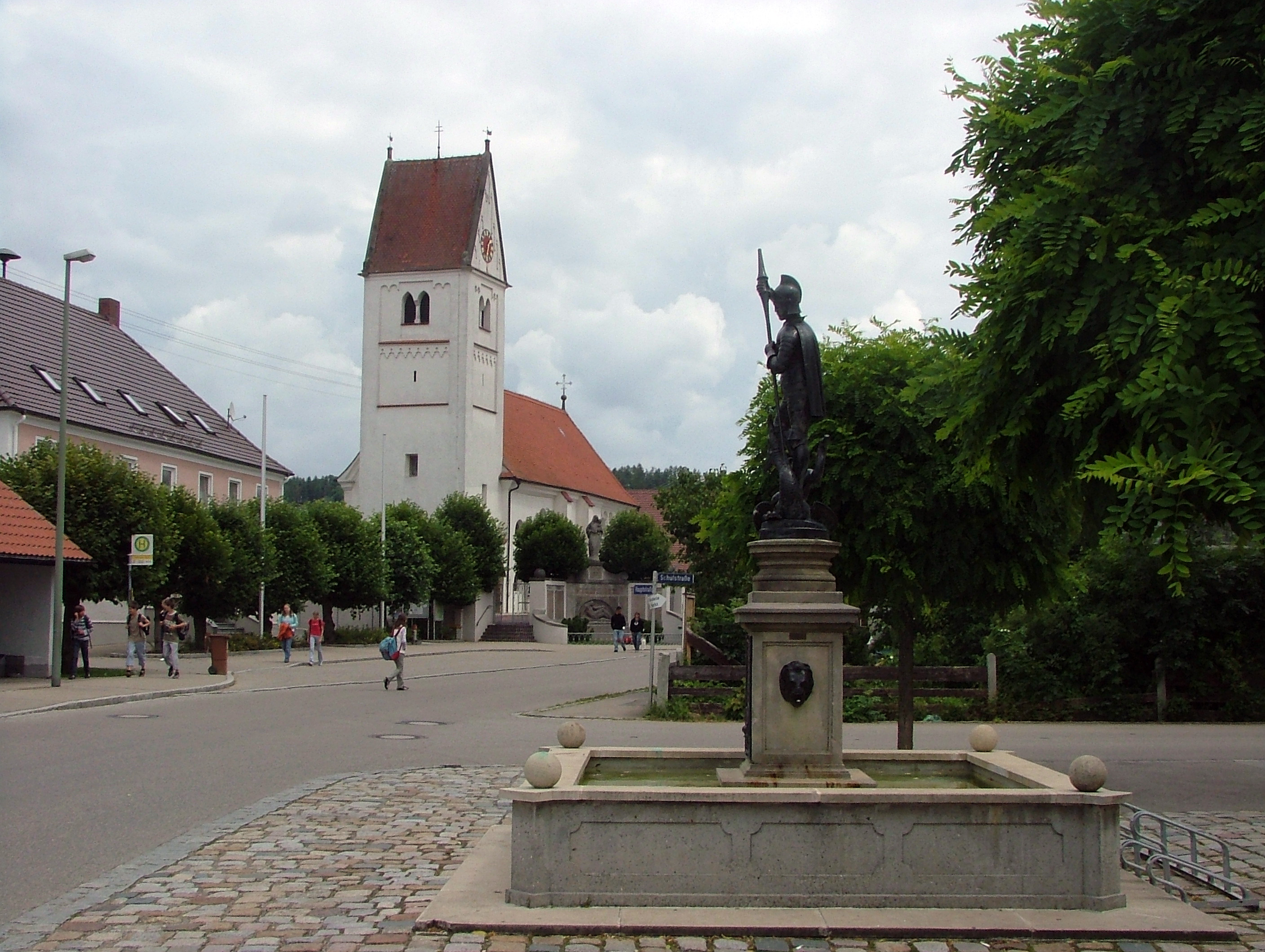
- Church of Saint George

- Coat of arms

- Location of Niederrieden within Unterallgäu district
- Interactive map of Niederrieden
- Location within Germany Location within Bavaria
- Coordinates: 48°3′N 10°11′E
- Country: Germany
- State: Bavaria
- Admin. region: Schwaben
- District: Unterallgäu
- Municipal assoc.: Boos

Government
  - Mayor (2020–26): Michael Büchler

Area
  - Total: 13.90 km^{2} (5.37 sq mi)
- Elevation: 582 m (1,909 ft)

Population (2025-12-31)
  - Total: 1,517
  - Density: 109.1/km^{2} (282.7/sq mi)
- Time zone: UTC+01:00 (CET)
  - Summer (DST): UTC+02:00 (CEST)
- Postal codes: 87767
- Dialling codes: 08335
- Vehicle registration: MN
- Website: www.vg-boos.de

Niederrieden is a municipality in the district of Unterallgäu in Bavaria, Germany. The town has a municipal association with Boos.
