= Kettershausen =

- Municipality
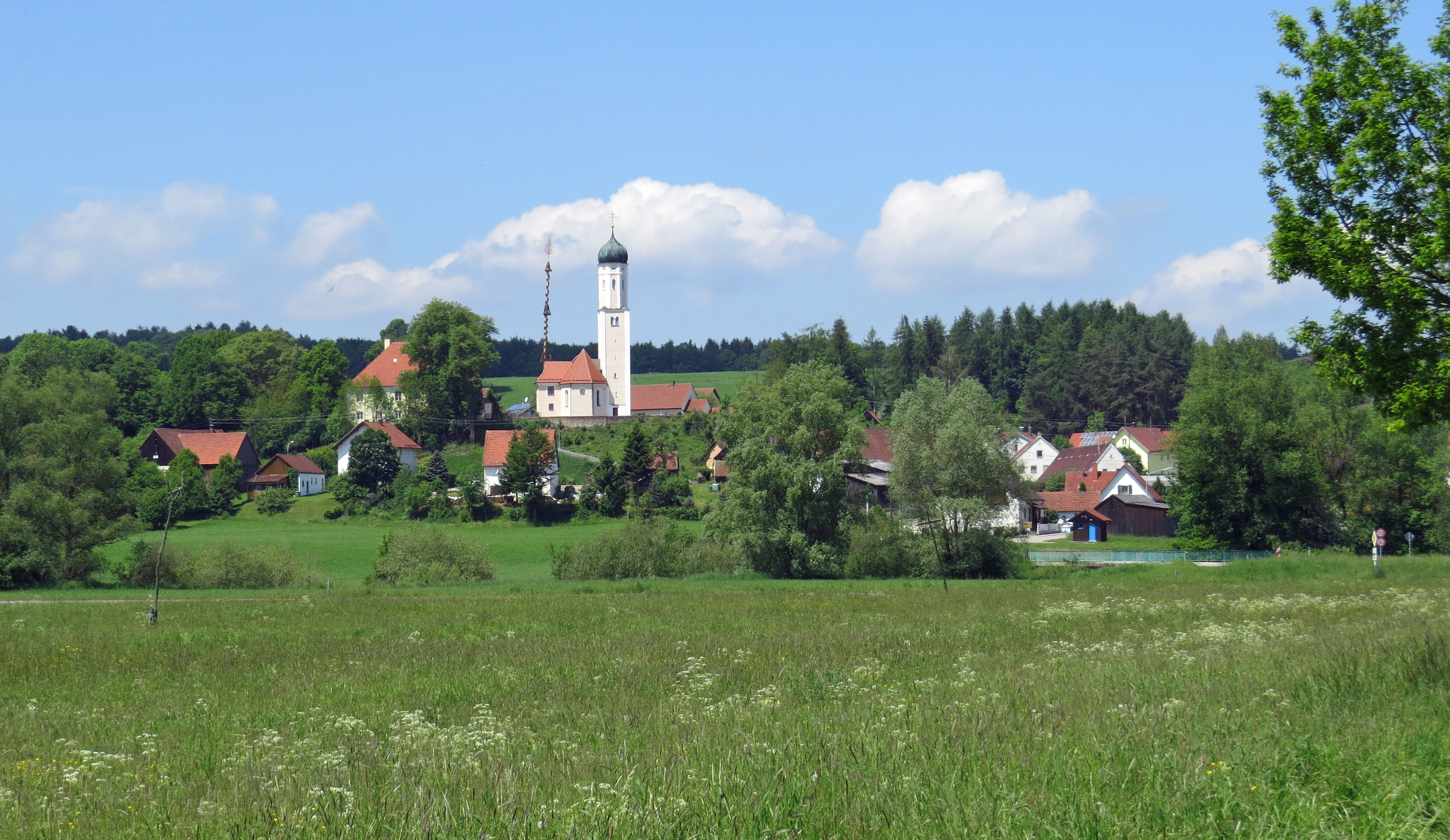
- Kettershausen - Tafertshofen

- Coat of arms

- Location of Kettershausen within Unterallgäu district
- Interactive map of Kettershausen
- Location within Germany Location within Bavaria
- Coordinates: 48°11′N 10°16′E
- Country: Germany
- State: Bavaria
- Admin. region: Schwaben
- District: Unterallgäu
- Municipal assoc.: Babenhausen

Government
  - Mayor (2020–26): Markus Koneberg

Area
  - Total: 26.73 km^{2} (10.32 sq mi)
- Elevation: 540 m (1,770 ft)

Population (2025-12-31)
  - Total: 1,874
  - Density: 70.11/km^{2} (181.6/sq mi)
- Time zone: UTC+01:00 (CET)
  - Summer (DST): UTC+02:00 (CEST)
- Postal codes: 86498
- Dialling codes: 08333
- Vehicle registration: MN (or KRU on req.)
- Website: www.kettershausen.de

Kettershausen (Swabian: Kettershausa) is a municipality in the district of Unterallgäu in Bavaria, Germany. The town has a municipal association with Babenhausen, Bavaria.

== Notable people ==
- Joseph Siegmund Bachmann (1754–1825), organist and composer, was born in Kettershausen
