= Illerwinkel =

- Verwaltungsgemeinschaft
- Location of Illerwinkel within Unterallgäu district
- Interactive map of Illerwinkel
- Location within Germany Location within Bavaria
- Coordinates: 47°51′N 10°08′E
- Country: Germany
- State: Bavaria
- Admin. region: Swabia
- District: Unterallgäu
- Seat: Legau
- Subdivisions: 3 municipalities

Area
  - Total: 64.71 km^{2} (24.98 sq mi)

Population (2025-12-31)
  - Total: 6,261
  - Density: 96.75/km^{2} (250.6/sq mi)
- Time zone: UTC+01:00 (CET)
  - Summer (DST): UTC+02:00 (CEST)
- Website: www.vg-illerwinkel.de

Illerwinkel is a Verwaltungsgemeinschaft (municipal association) in the district of Unterallgäu in Bavaria, Germany. Its seat is in Legau. It consists of the following municipalities:

- Kronburg
- Lautrach
- Legau
