= Kirchhaslach =

- Municipality
- Coat of arms

- Location of Kirchhaslach within Unterallgäu district
- Interactive map of Kirchhaslach
- Location within Germany Location within Bavaria
- Coordinates: 48°9′N 10°18′E
- Country: Germany
- State: Bavaria
- Admin. region: Schwaben
- District: Unterallgäu
- Municipal assoc.: Babenhausen

Government
  - Mayor (2020–26): Franz Grauer jun.

Area
  - Total: 32.04 km^{2} (12.37 sq mi)
- Elevation: 550 m (1,800 ft)

Population (2025-12-31)
  - Total: 1,312
  - Density: 40.95/km^{2} (106.1/sq mi)
- Time zone: UTC+01:00 (CET)
  - Summer (DST): UTC+02:00 (CEST)
- Postal codes: 87755
- Dialling codes: 08333
- Vehicle registration: MN
- Website: www.babenhausen-schwaben.de

Kirchhaslach is a municipality in the district of Unterallgäu in Bavaria, Germany. The town has a municipal association with Babenhausen, Bavaria.

== Buildings ==
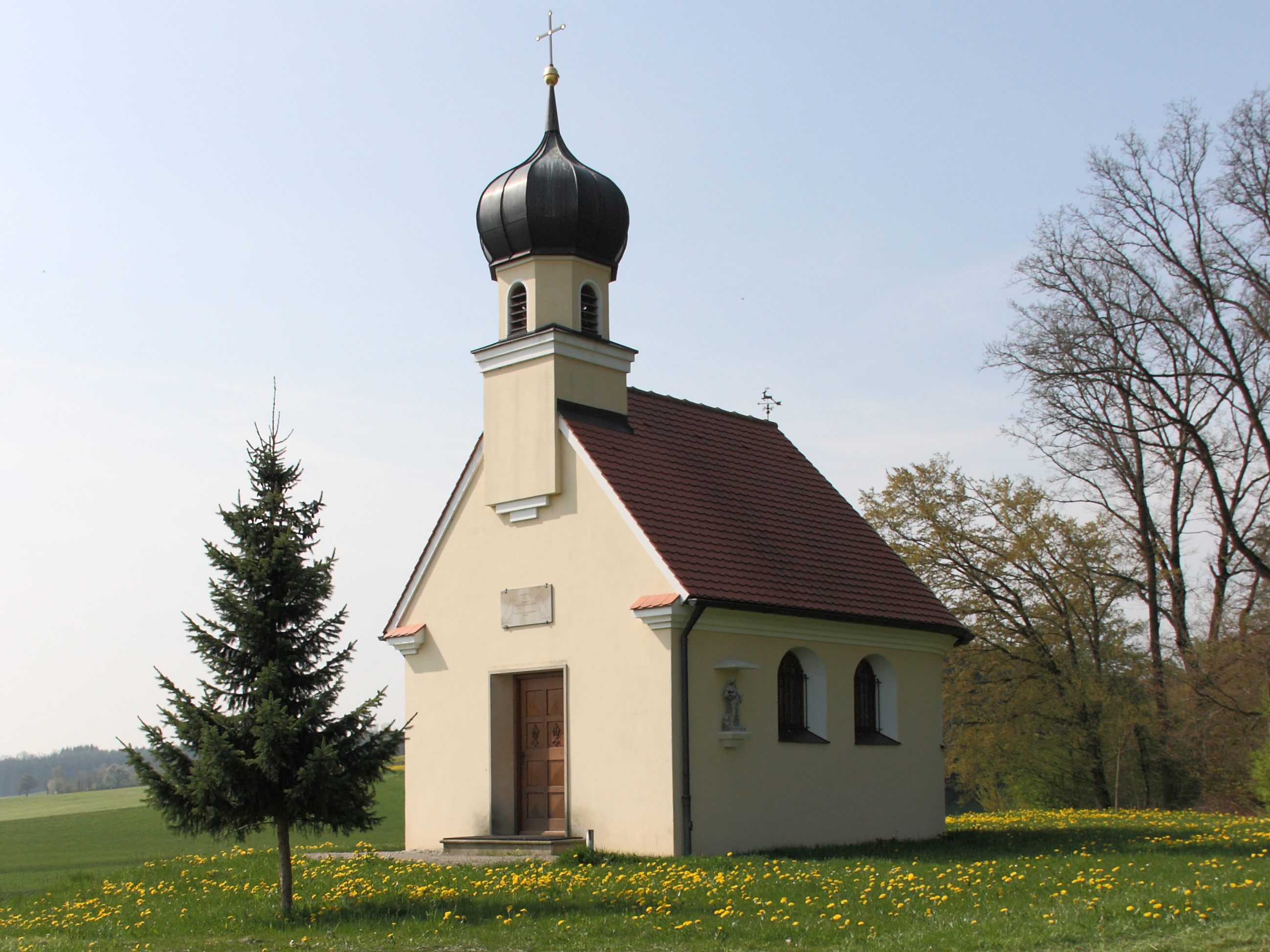
Fugger-Chapel, view from Northeast

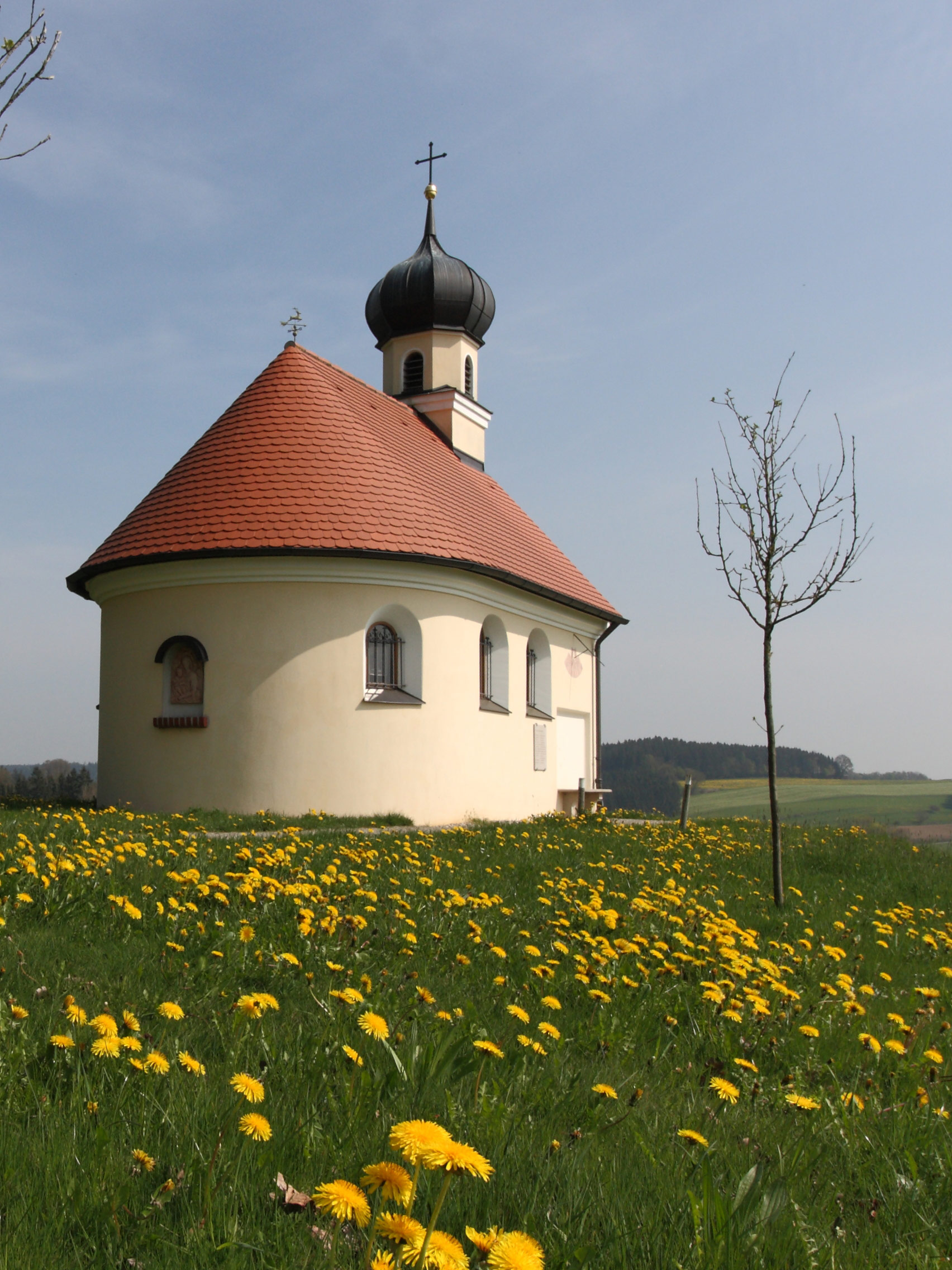
Fugger-Chapel, view from Southwest

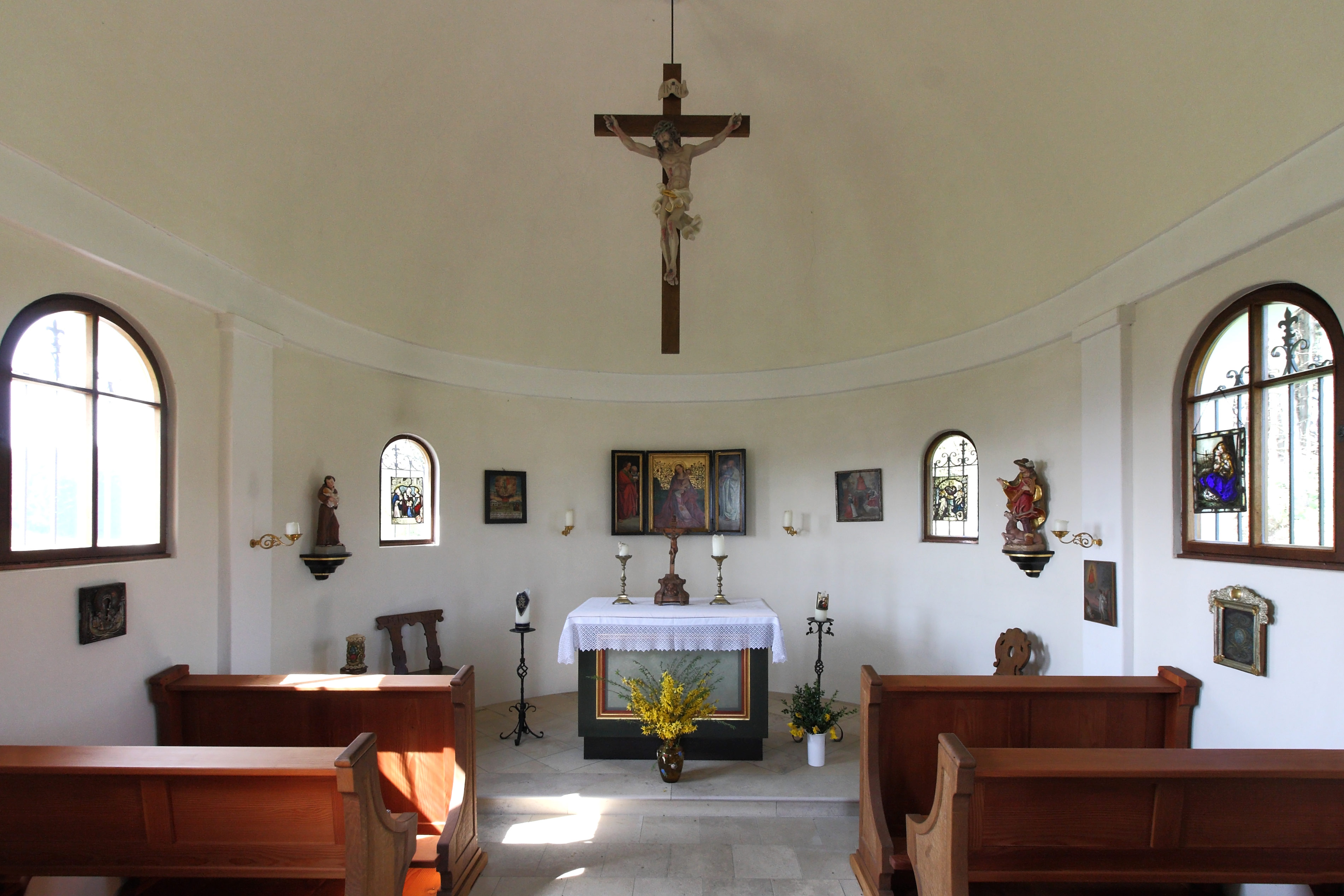
Fugger-Chapel inside

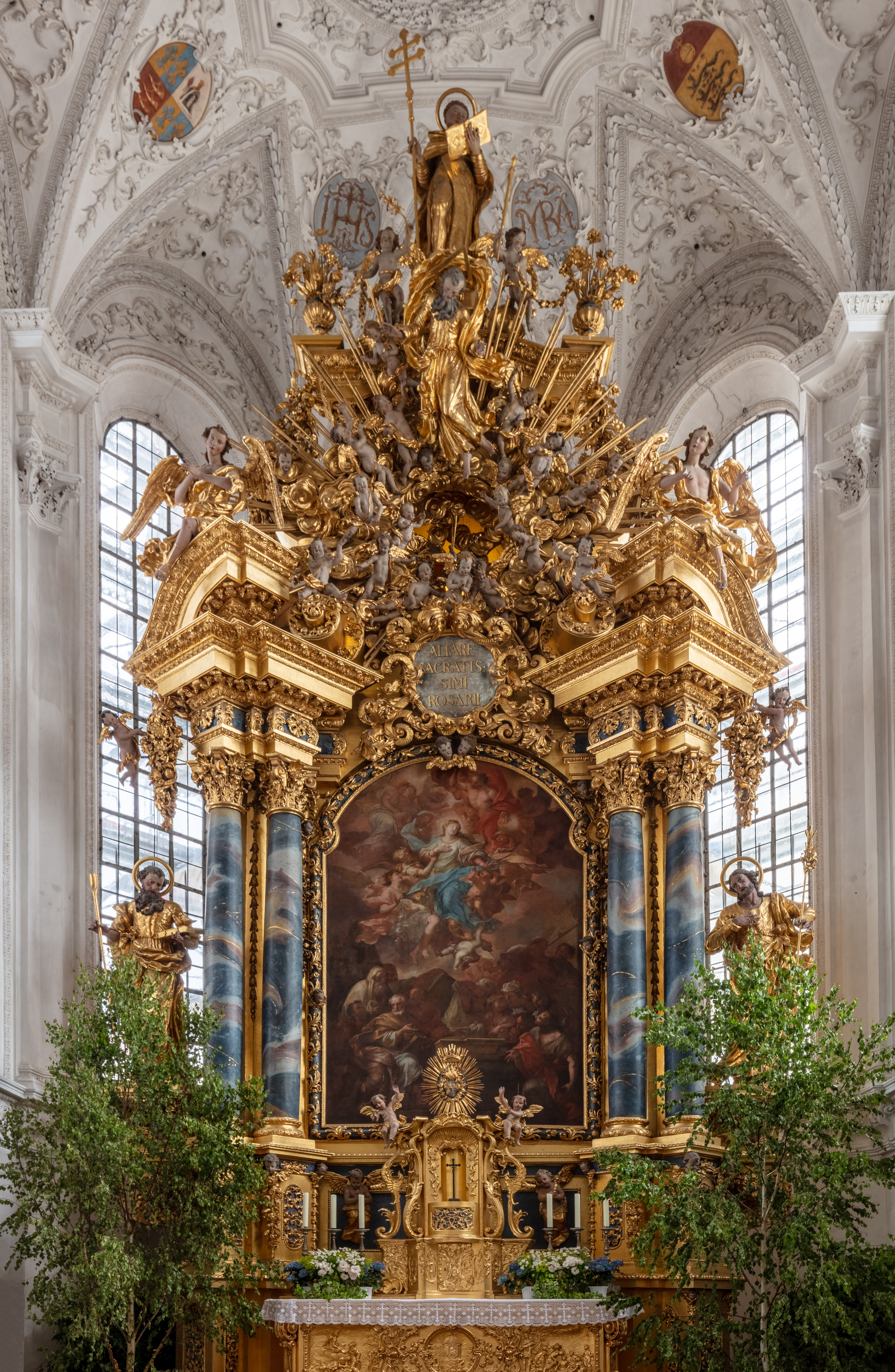
Parish church Kirchhaslach, high altar

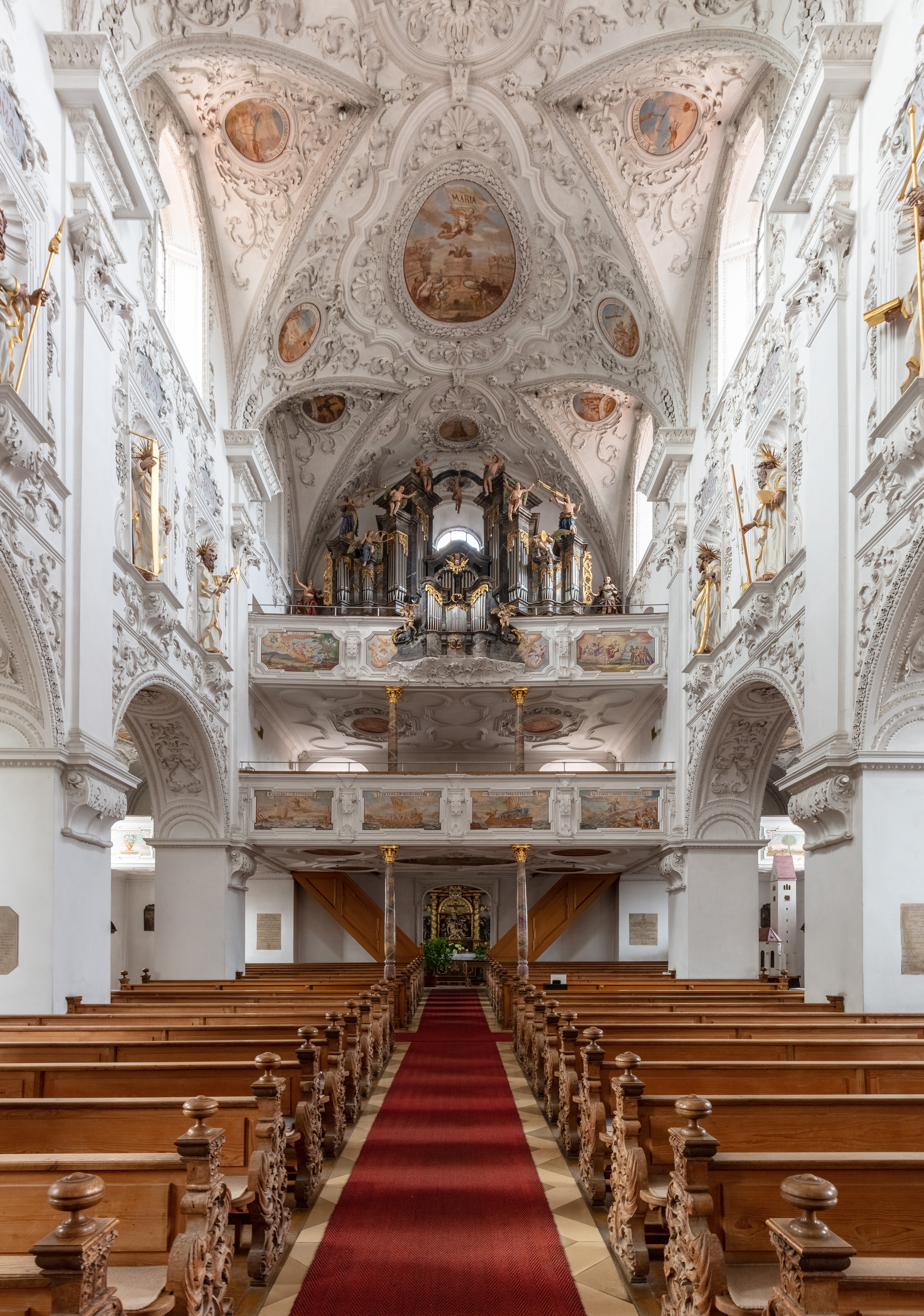
Parish church Kirchhaslach, nave and view of the organ pipe

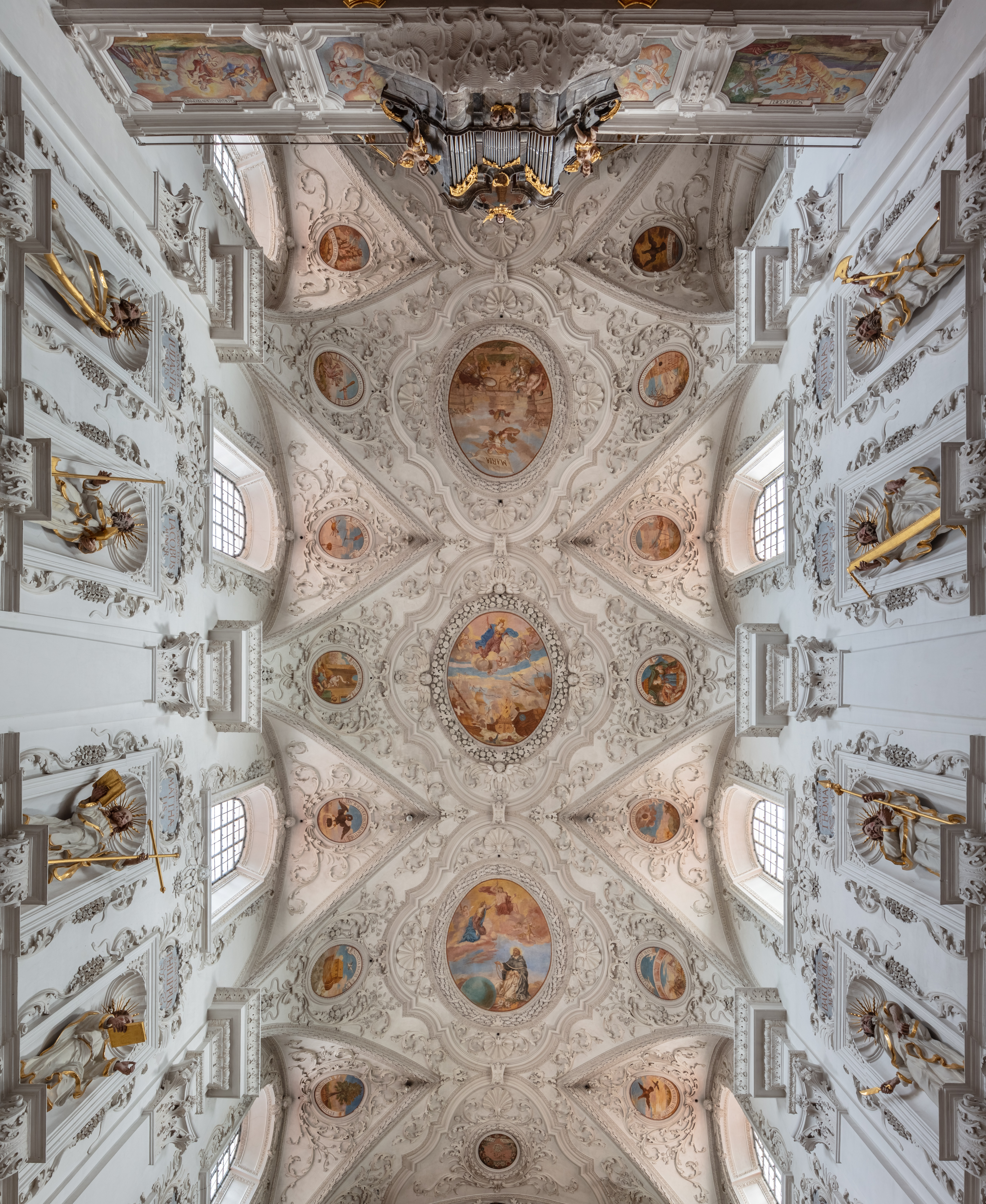
Parish church Kirchhaslach, ceiling
