= Bad Grönenbach =

- Municipality
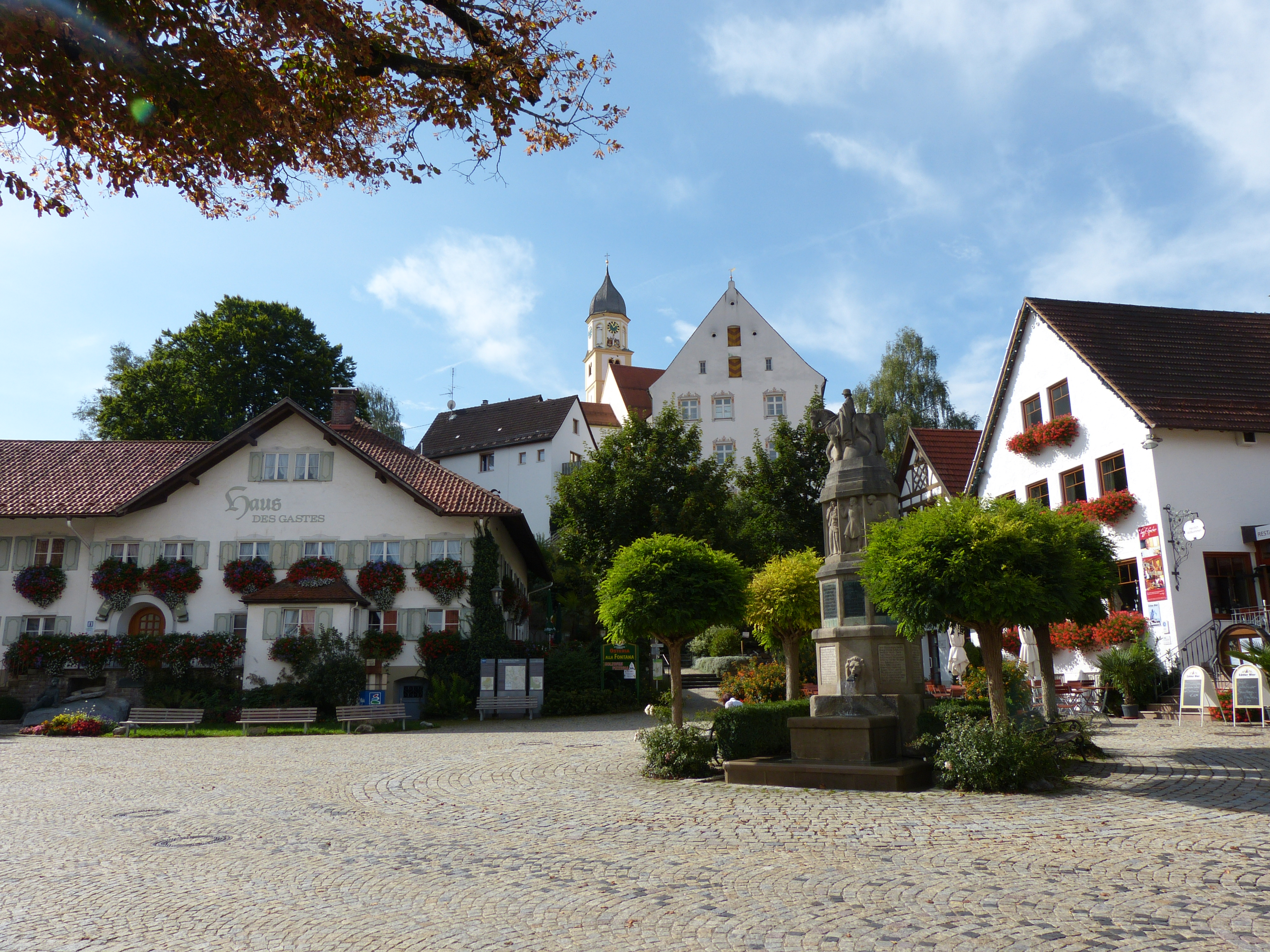
- Market square in Bad Grönenbach

- Flag Coat of arms

- Location of Bad Grönenbach within Unterallgäu district
- Interactive map of Bad Grönenbach
- Location within Germany Location within Bavaria
- Coordinates: 47°52′N 10°13′E
- Country: Germany
- State: Bavaria
- Admin. region: Schwaben
- District: Unterallgäu
- Municipal assoc.: Bad Grönenbach

Government
  - Mayor (2020–26): Bernhard Kerler

Area
  - Total: 42.03 km^{2} (16.23 sq mi)
- Elevation: 718 m (2,356 ft)

Population (2025-12-31)
  - Total: 5,771
  - Density: 137.3/km^{2} (355.6/sq mi)
- Time zone: UTC+01:00 (CET)
  - Summer (DST): UTC+02:00 (CEST)
- Postal codes: 87730
- Dialling codes: 08334
- Vehicle registration: MN
- Website: www.bad-groenenbach.de

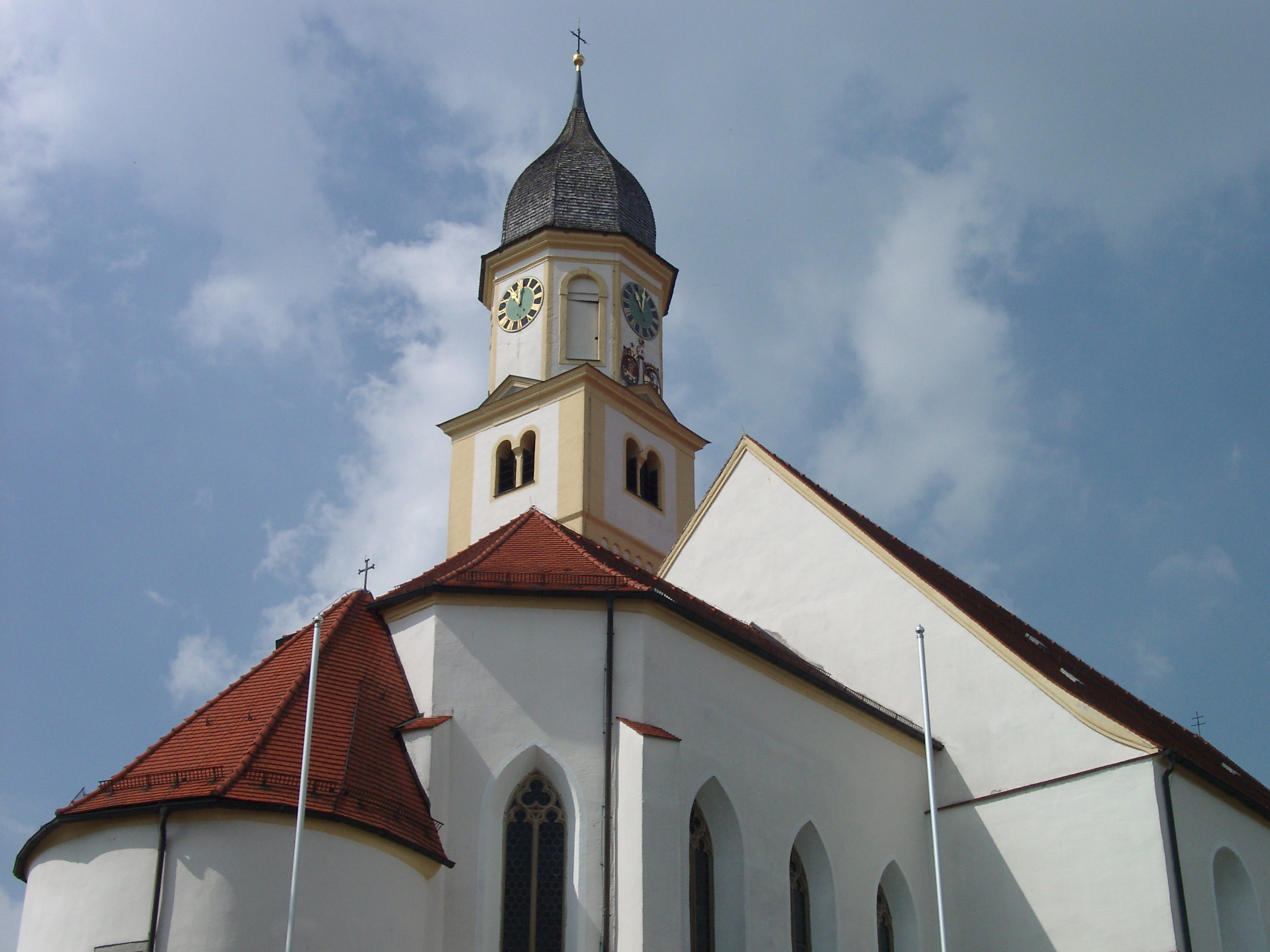
Parish church St. Philippus und Jakobus, Bad Grönenbach.

Bad Grönenbach is a market town in the district of Unterallgäu in Bavaria, Germany. It belongs to the region of Upper Swabia and the headquarters of the Gemeindeverband of the same name.

== Transport ==
Bad Grönenbach is located on the county road MN 15, which runs north of Memmingen on Woringen and Zell by Bad Grönenbach to Wolfertschwenden in an easterly direction. In the center of Bad Grönenbach begins the county road MN 24, which leads from Bad Grönenbach to the border of the district Oberallgäu in the south. From the west, the county road MN 21 leads from Legau over the hamlet Au and Rothenstein to Bad Groenenbach and flows there into the county road 24.

To the east of Bad Grönenbach runs the Bundesautobahn 7. The nearest motorway interchange is about two kilometers away and is located on the edge of belonging to Bad Grönenbach industrial park Thal.

The train station at Bad Grönenbach is located outside the village in the district Thal, about 2.5 km from the village center on the Illertalbahn. Originally, the railway line should lead directly to Bad Grönenbach, but was redesigned in 1862 to the existing route.

Bad Grönenbach is the starting point of the Iller Cycle Route between Ulm and Oberstdorf and the Kneipp Cycle Path, which was established in 1997 on the occasion of the 100th anniversary of the death of Sebastian Kneipp and connects the Kneipp spa towns of Bad Grönenbach, Ottobeuren and Bad Wörishofen with a length of around 50 kilometers. The longest of the signposted bike paths through Bad Grönenbach is the Swabian Bäderradweg with just under 250 kilometers from Überlingen on Lake Constance to the Kneipp spa town of Bad Wörishofen Almost continuous cycling routes exist from Bad Grönenbach to the municipalities of the Verwaltungsungsgemeinschaft Woringen and Wolfertschwenden.

== Culture and Attractions ==
- Castle Hohes Schloss, built in the 12th century
- Castle Unteres Schloss, 1563
- Castle Burg Rothenstein, built in the 11th century
- Roman catholic church St. Philippus und Jakobus, 1136. On October 15, 1445 it was built a new Gothic art building
- Hospital church Heiliger Geist, 1479
- Collegiate church St. Philipp und Jakob
- District office Amtshaus Rothenstein, built between the 16th and 17th century
