= Oberschönegg =

Municipality in Bavaria, Germany

- Municipality
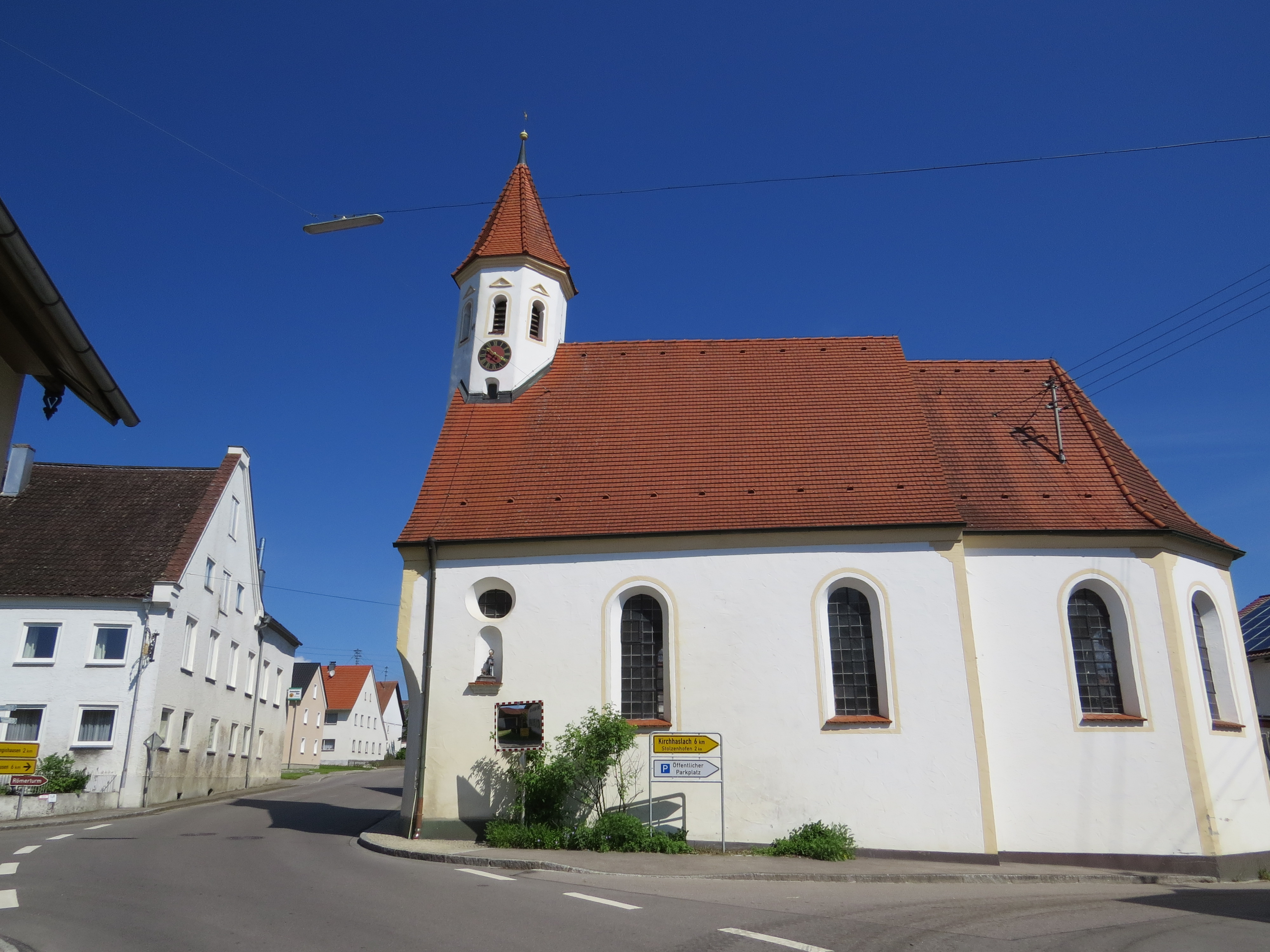
- Church of Saint Leonhard

- Coat of arms

- Location of Oberschönegg within Unterallgäu district
- Interactive map of Oberschönegg
- Location within Germany Location within Bavaria
- Coordinates: 48°6′N 10°18′E
- Country: Germany
- State: Bavaria
- Admin. region: Schwaben
- District: Unterallgäu
- Municipal assoc.: Babenhausen

Government
  - Mayor (2020–26): Günther Fuchs

Area
  - Total: 18.28 km^{2} (7.06 sq mi)
- Elevation: 630 m (2,070 ft)

Population (2025-12-31)
  - Total: 1,074
  - Density: 58.75/km^{2} (152.2/sq mi)
- Time zone: UTC+01:00 (CET)
  - Summer (DST): UTC+02:00 (CEST)
- Postal codes: 87770
- Dialling codes: 08333
- Vehicle registration: MN
- Website: www.oberschoenegg.de

Oberschönegg is a municipality in the district of Unterallgäu in Bavaria, Germany. The town has a municipal association with Babenhausen, Bavaria.
