= Egg an der Günz =

Egg a.d.Günz
- Municipality
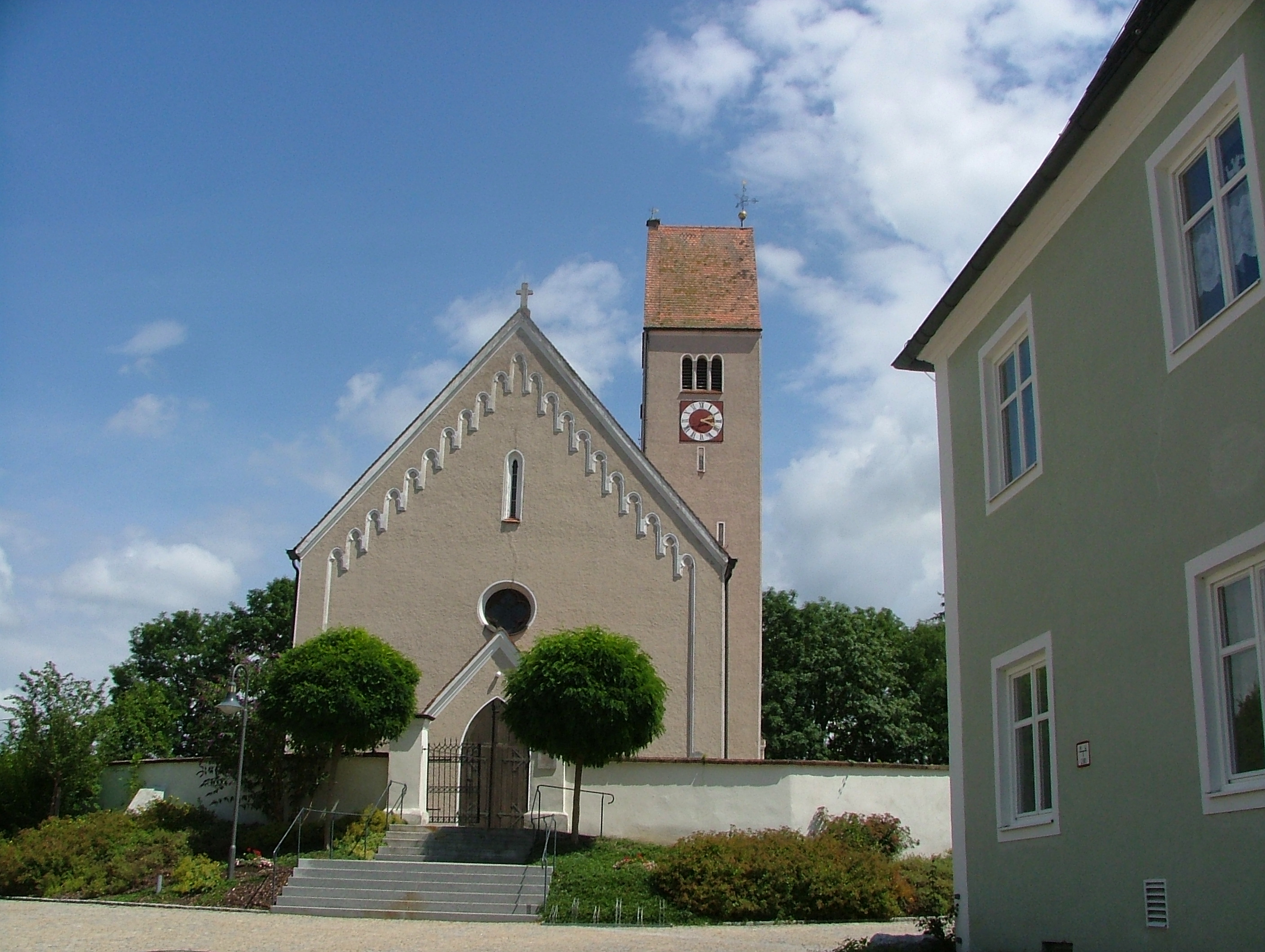
- Saint Bartholomew Church

- Coat of arms

- Location of Egg a.d.Günz within Unterallgäu district
- Interactive map of Egg a.d.Günz
- Location within Germany Location within Bavaria
- Coordinates: 48°5′N 10°17′E
- Country: Germany
- State: Bavaria
- Admin. region: Schwaben
- District: Unterallgäu
- Municipal assoc.: Babenhausen
- Subdivisions: 3 Ortsteile

Government
  - Mayor (2020–26): Wolfgang Walter

Area
  - Total: 20.65 km^{2} (7.97 sq mi)
- Elevation: 580 m (1,900 ft)

Population (2025-12-31)
  - Total: 1,192
  - Density: 57.72/km^{2} (149.5/sq mi)
- Time zone: UTC+01:00 (CET)
  - Summer (DST): UTC+02:00 (CEST)
- Postal codes: 87743
- Dialling codes: 08333
- Vehicle registration: MN
- Website: www.gemeinde-egg.de

Egg an der Günz (Alemannic German: Egg) is a municipality in the district of Unterallgäu in Bavaria, Germany. The town has a municipal association with Babenhausen, Bavaria.
