= Kronburg =

- Municipality
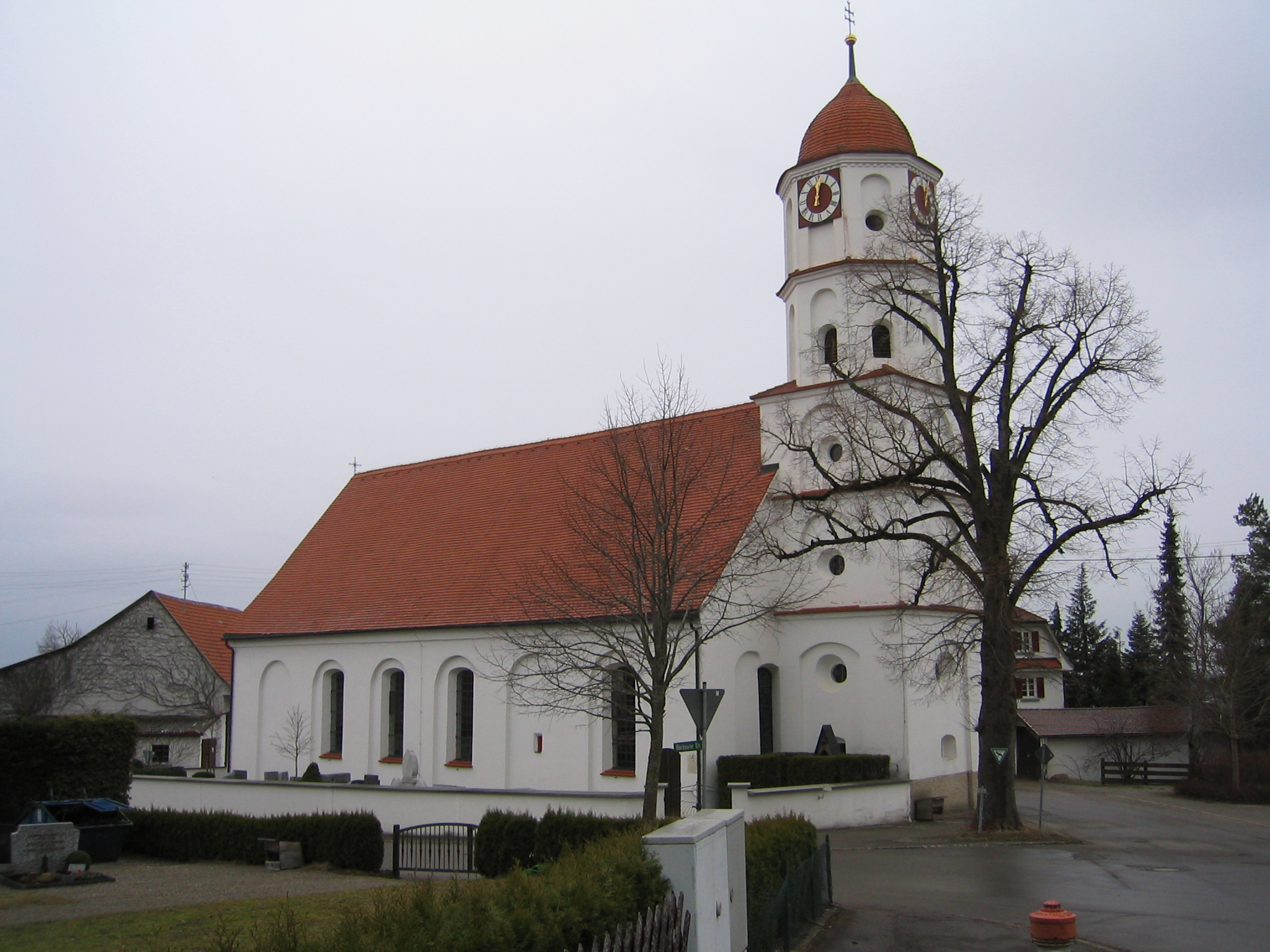
- Catholic Church

- Coat of arms

- Location of Kronburg within Unterallgäu district
- Interactive map of Kronburg
- Location within Germany Location within Bavaria
- Coordinates: 47°55′N 10°10′E
- Country: Germany
- State: Bavaria
- Admin. region: Schwaben
- District: Unterallgäu
- Municipal assoc.: Illerwinkel

Government
  - Mayor (2020–26): Hermann Gromer (FW)

Area
  - Total: 20.19 km^{2} (7.80 sq mi)
- Elevation: 744 m (2,441 ft)

Population (2025-12-31)
  - Total: 1,756
  - Density: 86.97/km^{2} (225.3/sq mi)
- Time zone: UTC+01:00 (CET)
  - Summer (DST): UTC+02:00 (CEST)
- Postal codes: 87758
- Dialling codes: 08394
- Vehicle registration: MN
- Website: www.illerbeuren.de

Kronburg is a municipality in the district of Unterallgäu in Bavaria, Germany.
