= Joseph Siegmund Bachmann =

German organist and composer

Joseph Siegmund Bachmann (monastic name Sixtus Bachmann; 18 July 1754 – 18 October 1825) was a German organist and composer. Musically talented at an early age, he had an organ-playing competition in 1766 with the ten-year-old Wolfgang Amadeus Mozart.

== Life ==
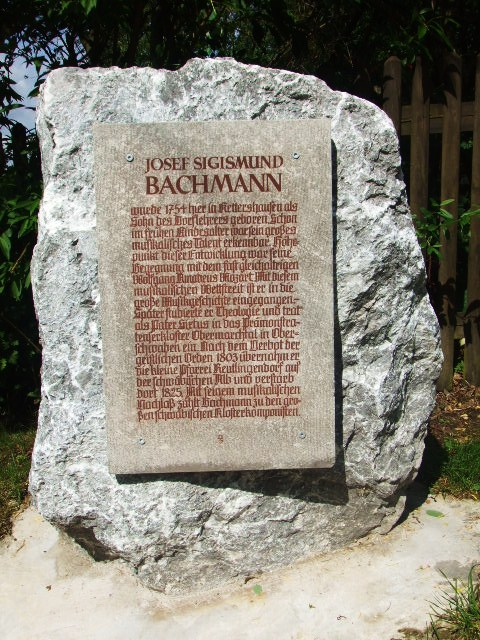
Memorial stone for Joseph Siegmund Bachmann in Kettershausen

He was born in Kettershausen in 1754, son of Franz Anton Bachmann and his wife Maria Anna Franziska. He had notable musical abilities at an early age. In November 1766 in Biberbach, where his grandfather Franz Joseph Schmöger was organist, he had an organ-playing competition with Mozart who was then aged ten.

Bachmann was educated at the Benedictine monastery at Elchingen, and from 1771 he studied music at the Premonstratensian monastery Marchtal Abbey, where in 1773 he took holy orders. From 1782 he was choirmaster, organist and later a teacher of theology at this abbey. In 1803 he moved to Reutlingendorf, where he died in 1825.

== Works ==
He wrote masses, keyboard sonatas, string quartets, symphonies and organ fugues. Many of his compositions are unpublished.
