= Wolfertschwenden =

- Municipality
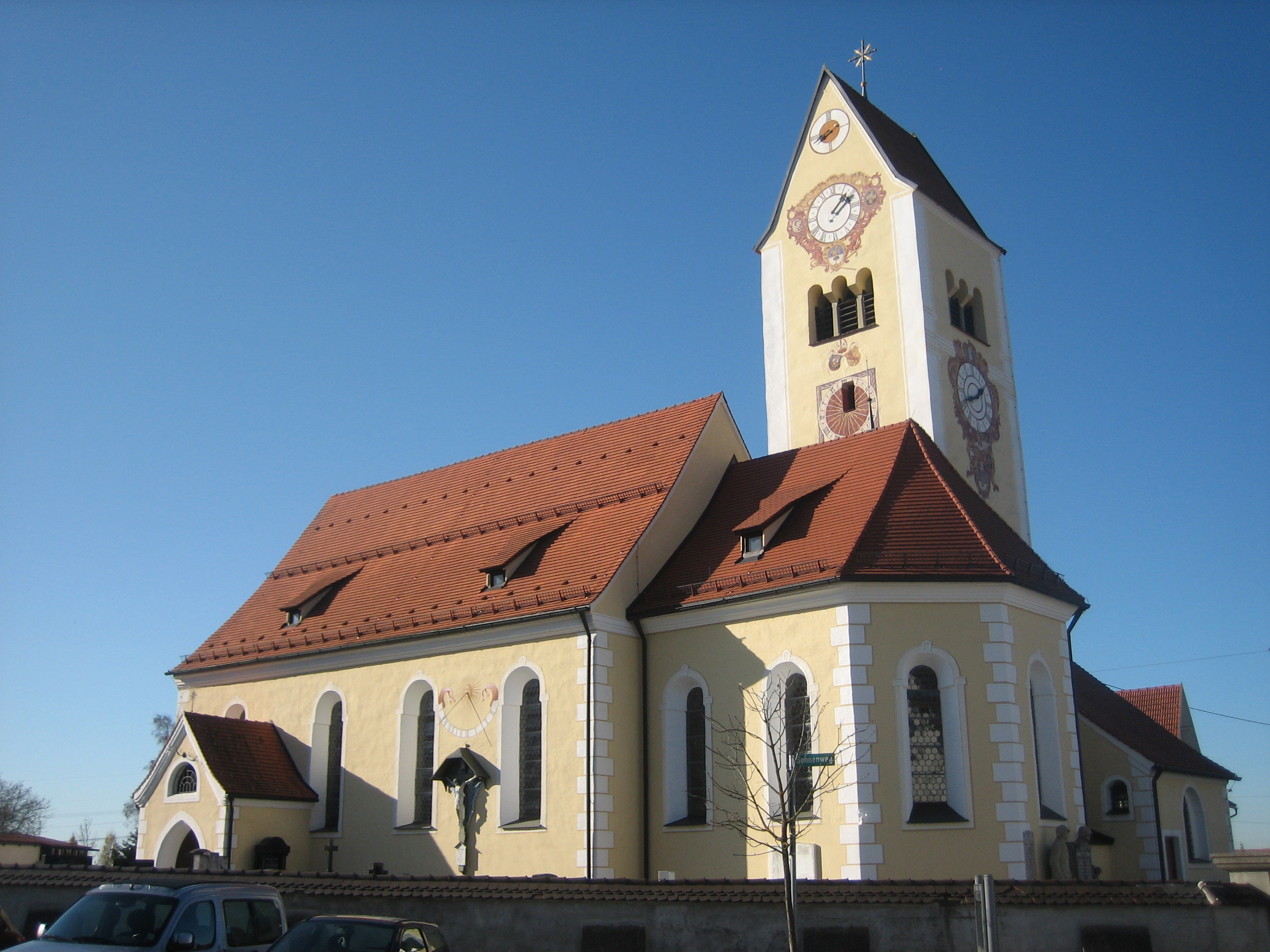
- Saint Vitus Church

- Coat of arms

- Location of Wolfertschwenden within Unterallgäu district
- Interactive map of Wolfertschwenden
- Location within Germany Location within Bavaria
- Coordinates: 47°53′N 10°16′E
- Country: Germany
- State: Bavaria
- Admin. region: Schwaben
- District: Unterallgäu
- Municipal assoc.: Bad Grönenbach

Government
  - Mayor (2020–26): Beate Ullrich (CSU)

Area
  - Total: 14.48 km^{2} (5.59 sq mi)
- Elevation: 678 m (2,224 ft)

Population (2025-12-31)
  - Total: 2,102
  - Density: 145.2/km^{2} (376.0/sq mi)
- Time zone: UTC+01:00 (CET)
  - Summer (DST): UTC+02:00 (CEST)
- Postal codes: 87787
- Dialling codes: 08334
- Vehicle registration: MN
- Website: www.wolfertschwenden.de

Wolfertschwenden (German pronunciation: [ˈvɔlfɐtʃvɛndn̩]) is a municipality in the district of Unterallgäu in Bavaria, Germany.
