= Pfaffenhausen (Verwaltungsgemeinschaft) =

- Verwaltungsgemeinschaft
- Location of Pfaffenhausen within Unterallgäu district
- Interactive map of Pfaffenhausen
- Location within Germany Location within Bavaria
- Coordinates: 48°07′N 10°27′E
- Country: Germany
- State: Bavaria
- Admin. region: Swabia
- District: Unterallgäu
- Seat: Pfaffenhausen
- Subdivisions: 4 municipalities

Area
  - Total: 107.12 km^{2} (41.36 sq mi)

Population (2025-12-31)
  - Total: 7,666
  - Density: 71.56/km^{2} (185.4/sq mi)
- Time zone: UTC+01:00 (CET)
  - Summer (DST): UTC+02:00 (CEST)
- Website: vgem-pfaffenhausen.de

Pfaffenhausen is a Verwaltungsgemeinschaft (municipal association) in the district of Unterallgäu in Bavaria, Germany. Its seat is in Pfaffenhausen. It consists of the following municipalities:

1. Breitenbrunn
2. Oberrieden
3. Pfaffenhausen
4. Salgen
