= Heimertingen =

- Municipality
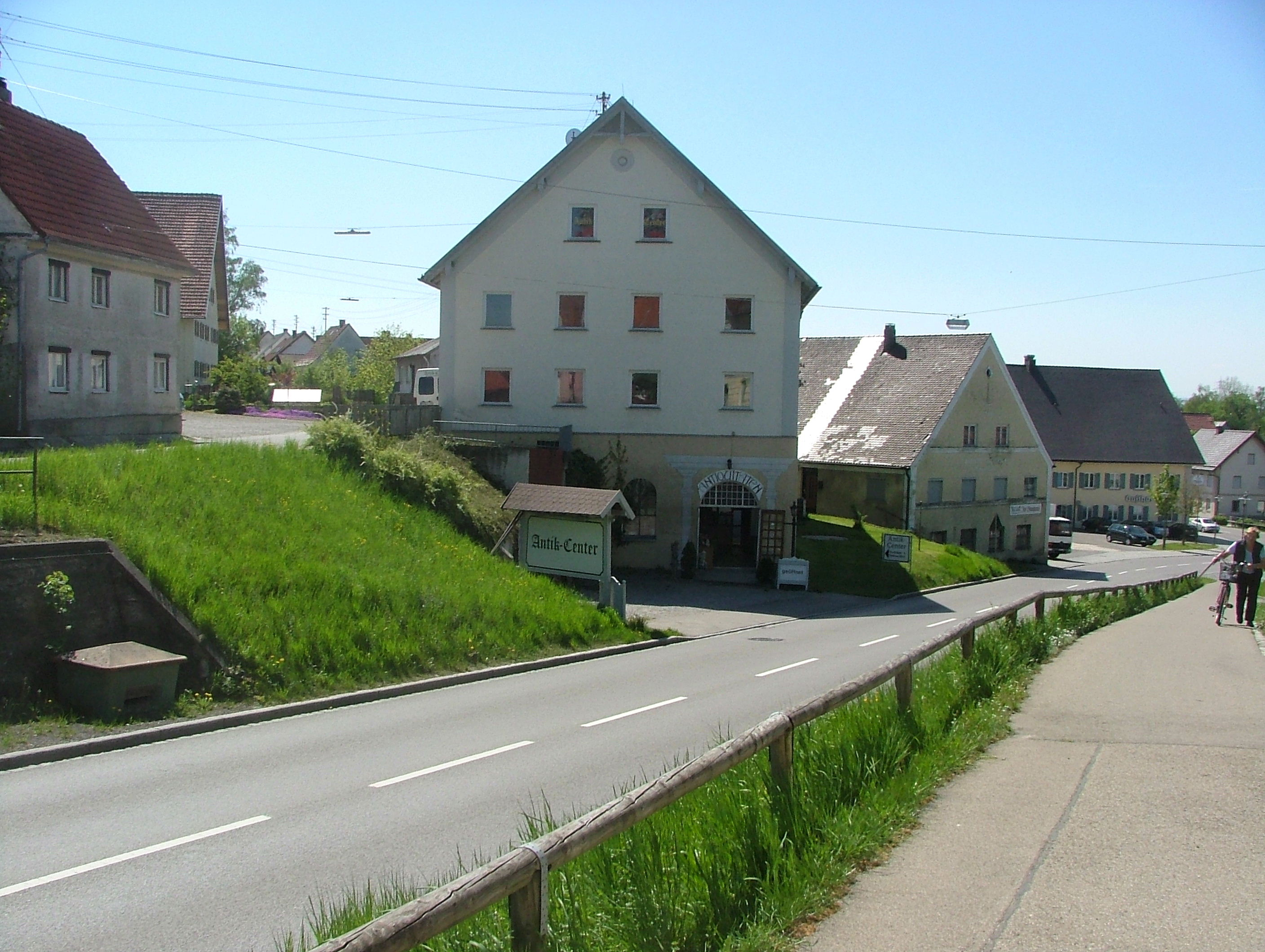
- Ulm Street in Heimertingen

- Coat of arms

- Location of Heimertingen within Unterallgäu district
- Interactive map of Heimertingen
- Location within Germany Location within Bavaria
- Coordinates: 48°2′N 10°9′E
- Country: Germany
- State: Bavaria
- Admin. region: Schwaben
- District: Unterallgäu
- Municipal assoc.: Boos

Government
  - Mayor (2020–26): Josef Wechsel

Area
  - Total: 13.88 km^{2} (5.36 sq mi)
- Elevation: 579 m (1,900 ft)

Population (2025-12-31)
  - Total: 1,868
  - Density: 134.6/km^{2} (348.6/sq mi)
- Time zone: UTC+01:00 (CET)
  - Summer (DST): UTC+02:00 (CEST)
- Postal codes: 87751
- Dialling codes: 08335
- Vehicle registration: MN
- Website: www.vg-boos.de

Heimertingen is a municipality in the district of Unterallgäu in Bavaria, Germany. The town has a municipal association with Boos, Bavaria.
