= Legau =

- Municipality
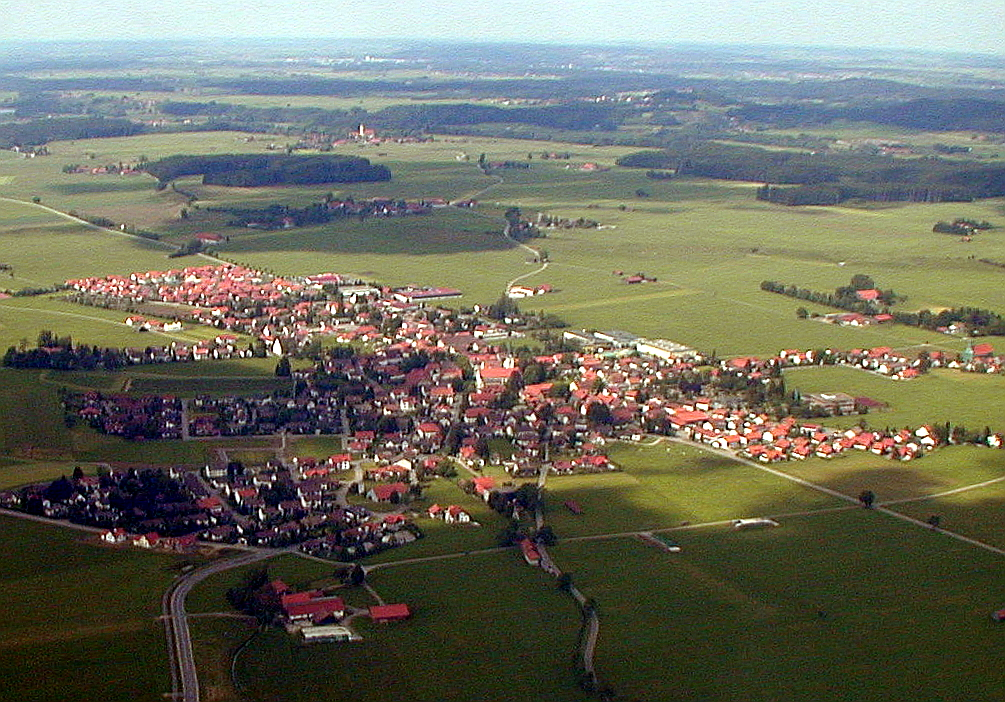
- Legau

- Coat of arms

- Location of Legau within Unterallgäu district
- Interactive map of Legau
- Location within Germany Location within Bavaria
- Coordinates: 47°51′N 10°8′E
- Country: Germany
- State: Bavaria
- Admin. region: Schwaben
- District: Unterallgäu
- Municipal assoc.: Illerwinkel

Government
  - Mayor (2020–26): Thomas Heinle (CSU)

Area
  - Total: 36.35 km^{2} (14.03 sq mi)
- Elevation: 667 m (2,188 ft)

Population (2025-12-31)
  - Total: 3,232
  - Density: 88.91/km^{2} (230.3/sq mi)
- Time zone: UTC+01:00 (CET)
  - Summer (DST): UTC+02:00 (CEST)
- Postal codes: 87764
- Dialling codes: 08330
- Vehicle registration: MN
- Website: www.legau.de

Legau is a municipality in the district of Unterallgäu in Bavaria, Germany.
