= Dirlewang =

- Municipality
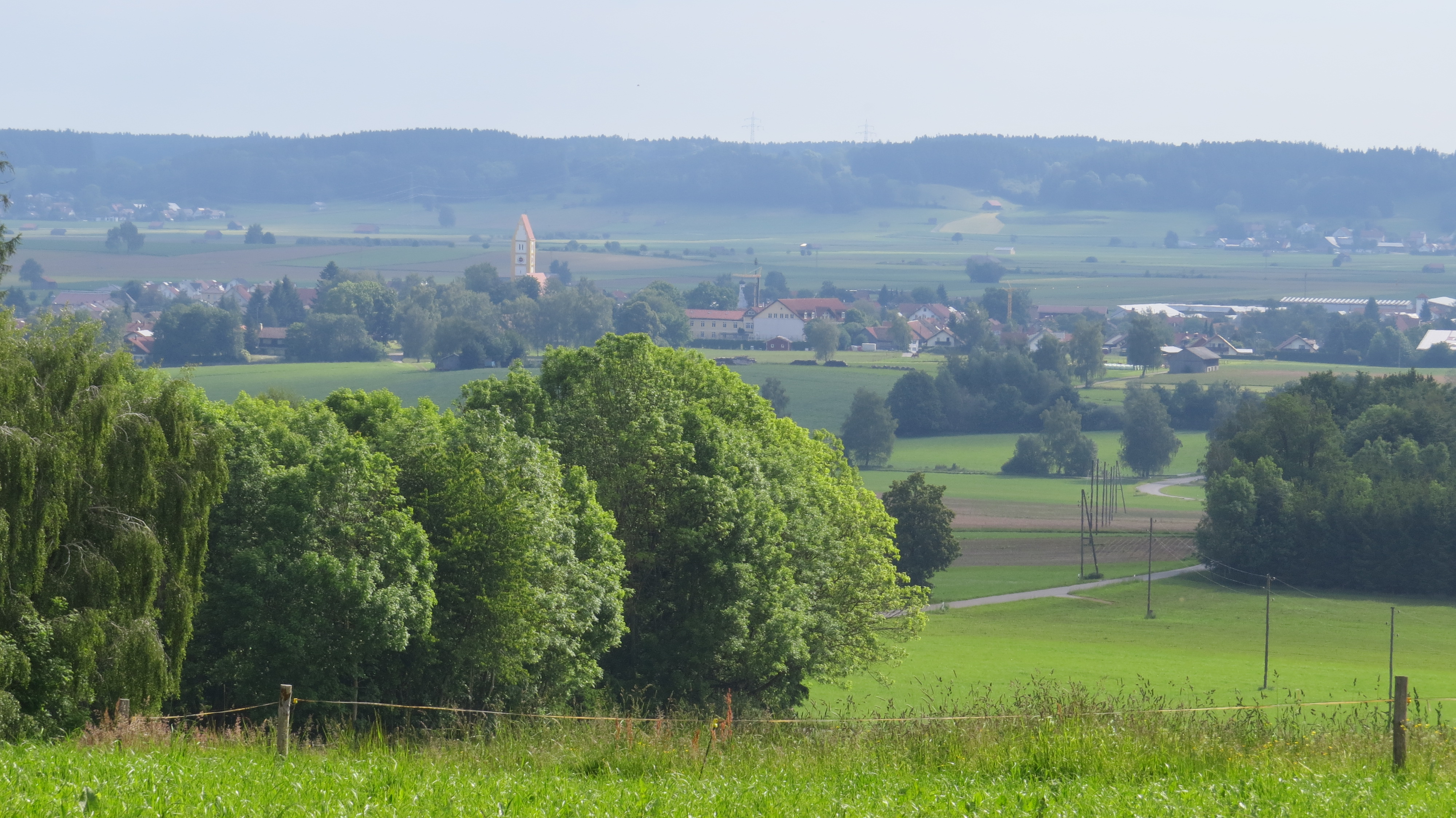
- Dirlewang seen from the southwest

- Coat of arms

- Location of Dirlewang within Unterallgäu district
- Interactive map of Dirlewang
- Location within Germany Location within Bavaria
- Coordinates: 48°0′N 10°30′E
- Country: Germany
- State: Bavaria
- Admin. region: Schwaben
- District: Unterallgäu
- Municipal assoc.: Dirlewang

Government
  - Mayor (2020–26): Alois Mayer

Area
  - Total: 23.30 km^{2} (9.00 sq mi)
- Elevation: 620 m (2,030 ft)

Population (2025-12-31)
  - Total: 2,285
  - Density: 98.07/km^{2} (254.0/sq mi)
- Time zone: UTC+01:00 (CET)
  - Summer (DST): UTC+02:00 (CEST)
- Postal codes: 87742
- Dialling codes: 08267
- Vehicle registration: MN
- Website: www.dirlewang.de

Dirlewang is a market town and municipality in the district of Unterallgäu in Bavaria, Germany. The town is seat of a municipal association with Apfeltrach, Stetten, Bavaria and Unteregg.

The town of Dirlewang is recorded as one of place where Johannes Gossner, German evangelist and philanthropist, staying from 1804 until 1811.
