= Pfaffenhausen =

- Municipality
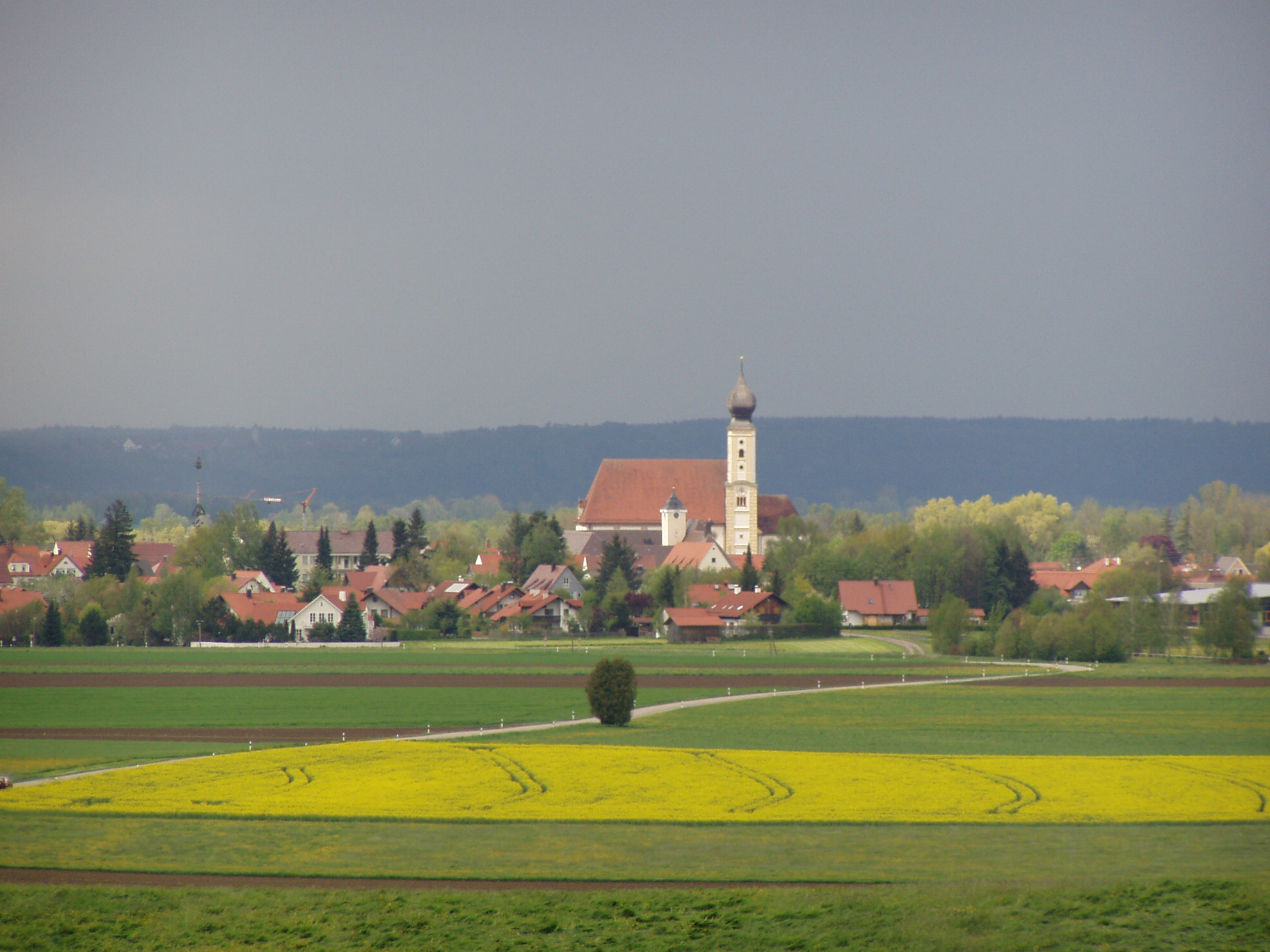
- Pfaffenhausen seen from the south

- Coat of arms

- Location of Pfaffenhausen within Unterallgäu district
- Interactive map of Pfaffenhausen
- Location within Germany Location within Bavaria
- Coordinates: 48°7′N 10°27′E
- Country: Germany
- State: Bavaria
- Admin. region: Schwaben
- District: Unterallgäu
- Municipal assoc.: Pfaffenhausen

Government
  - Mayor (2022–28): Thomas Leinauer

Area
  - Total: 21.11 km^{2} (8.15 sq mi)
- Elevation: 563 m (1,847 ft)

Population (2025-12-31)
  - Total: 2,678
  - Density: 126.9/km^{2} (328.6/sq mi)
- Time zone: UTC+01:00 (CET)
  - Summer (DST): UTC+02:00 (CEST)
- Postal codes: 87772
- Dialling codes: 08265
- Vehicle registration: MN
- Website: www.pfaffenhausen.info

Pfaffenhausen is a municipality in the district of Unterallgäu in Bavaria, Germany. The town is seat of a municipal association with Breitenbrunn, Swabia, Oberrieden, Bavaria and Salgen.

German car manufacturer Ruf Automobile has been headquartered in the east of the town since they were founded in 1939.
