= Unteregg =

- Municipality
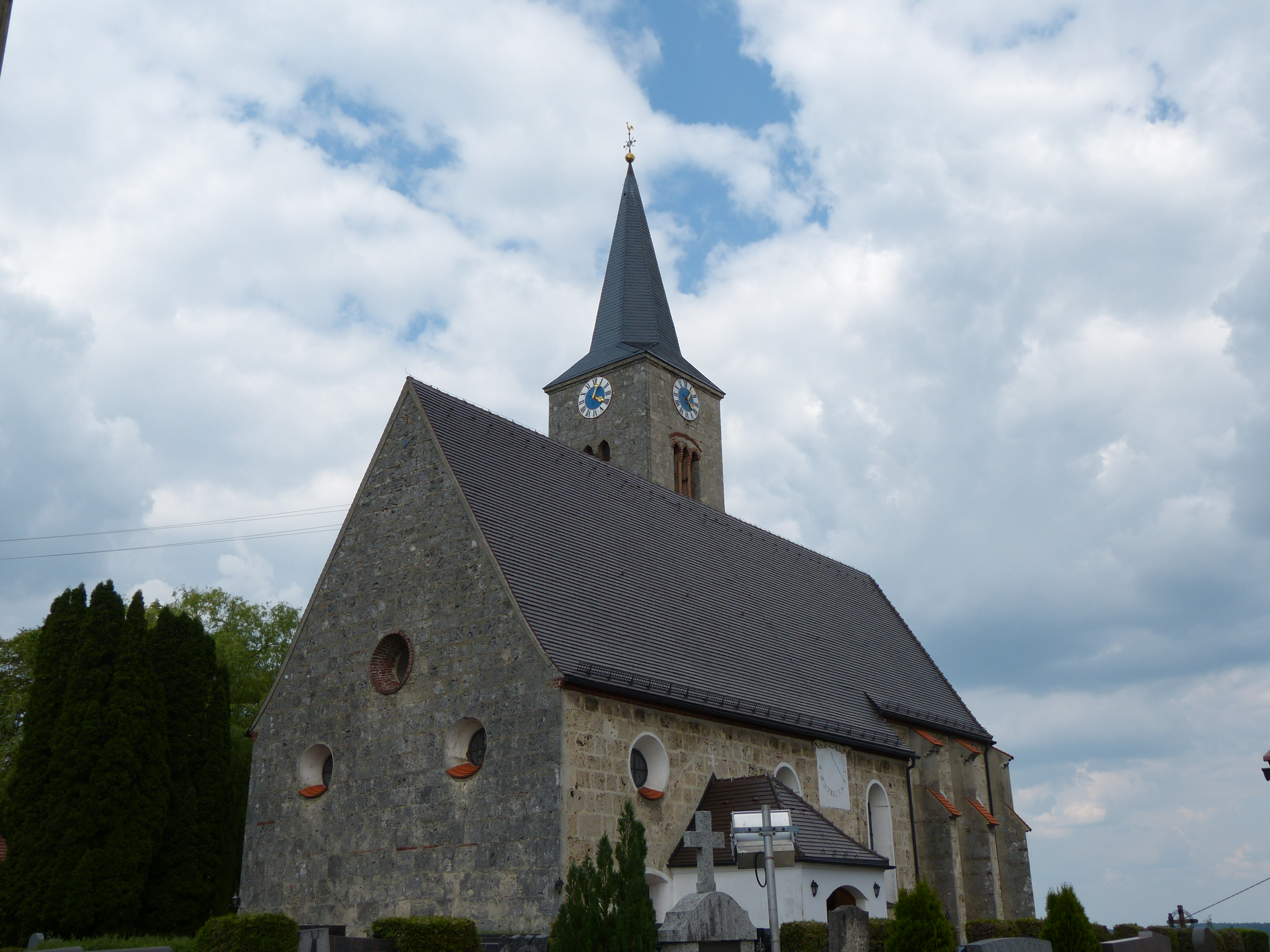
- Church of Saint Martin

- Coat of arms

- Location of Unteregg within Unterallgäu district
- Interactive map of Unteregg
- Location within Germany Location within Bavaria
- Coordinates: 47°58′N 10°28′E
- Country: Germany
- State: Bavaria
- Admin. region: Schwaben
- District: Unterallgäu
- Municipal assoc.: Dirlewang

Government
  - Mayor (2020–26): Marlene Preißinger

Area
  - Total: 23.70 km^{2} (9.15 sq mi)
- Elevation: 717 m (2,352 ft)

Population (2025-12-31)
  - Total: 1,414
  - Density: 59.66/km^{2} (154.5/sq mi)
- Time zone: UTC+01:00 (CET)
  - Summer (DST): UTC+02:00 (CEST)
- Postal codes: 87782
- Dialling codes: 08269
- Vehicle registration: MN
- Website: www.unteregg-online.de

Unteregg is a municipality in the district of Unterallgäu in Bavaria, Germany. The town has a municipal association with Dirlewang.
