= Boos (Verwaltungsgemeinschaft) =

- Verwaltungsgemeinschaft
- Location of Boos within Unterallgäu district
- Interactive map of Boos
- Location within Germany Location within Bavaria
- Coordinates: 48°04′N 10°12′E
- Country: Germany
- State: Bavaria
- Admin. region: Swabia
- District: Unterallgäu
- Seat: Boos
- Subdivisions: 5 municipalities

Area
  - Total: 65.78 km^{2} (25.40 sq mi)

Population (2025-12-31)
  - Total: 7,798
  - Density: 118.5/km^{2} (307.0/sq mi)
- Time zone: UTC+01:00 (CET)
  - Summer (DST): UTC+02:00 (CEST)
- Website: www.vgem-boos.de

Boos is a Verwaltungsgemeinschaft (municipal association) in the district of Unterallgäu in Bavaria, Germany. Its seat is in Boos. It consists of the following municipalities:

1. Boos
2. Fellheim
3. Heimertingen
4. Niederrieden
5. Pleß
