= Lautrach =

- Municipality
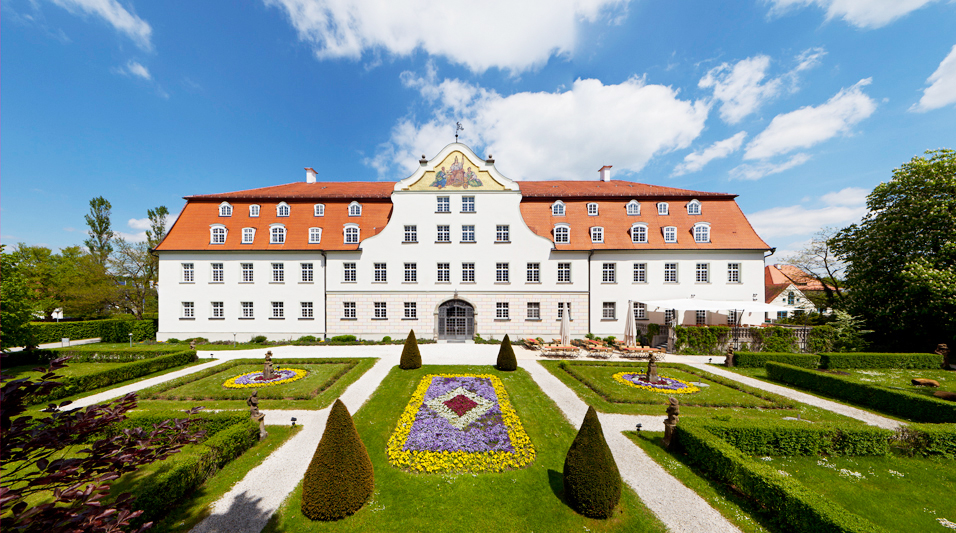
- Lautrach Castle

- Coat of arms

- Location of Lautrach within Unterallgäu district
- Interactive map of Lautrach
- Location within Germany Location within Bavaria
- Coordinates: 47°54′N 10°8′E
- Country: Germany
- State: Bavaria
- Admin. region: Schwaben
- District: Unterallgäu
- Municipal assoc.: Illerwinkel

Government
  - Mayor (2020–26): Reinhard Dorn (FW)

Area
  - Total: 8.07 km^{2} (3.12 sq mi)
- Elevation: 631 m (2,070 ft)

Population (2025-12-31)
  - Total: 1,273
  - Density: 158/km^{2} (409/sq mi)
- Time zone: UTC+01:00 (CET)
  - Summer (DST): UTC+02:00 (CEST)
- Postal codes: 87763
- Dialling codes: 08394
- Vehicle registration: MN
- Website: www.lautrach.de

Lautrach (German pronunciation: [ˈlaʊtʁax]) is a municipality in the district of Unterallgäu in Bavaria, Germany.
