= Stetten, Bavaria =

Stetten
- Municipality
- Coat of arms

- Location of Stetten within Unterallgäu district
- Interactive map of Stetten
- Location within Germany Location within Bavaria
- Coordinates: 48°2′N 10°26′E
- Country: Germany
- State: Bavaria
- Admin. region: Schwaben
- District: Unterallgäu
- Municipal assoc.: Dirlewang

Government
  - Mayor (2019–25): Uwe Gelhardt

Area
  - Total: 15.7 km^{2} (6.1 sq mi)
- Elevation: 612 m (2,008 ft)

Population (2025-12-31)
  - Total: 1,477
  - Density: 94.1/km^{2} (244/sq mi)
- Time zone: UTC+01:00 (CET)
  - Summer (DST): UTC+02:00 (CEST)
- Postal codes: 87778
- Dialling codes: 08261
- Vehicle registration: MN

Stetten (German pronunciation: [ˈʃtɛtn̩]) is a municipality in the district of Unterallgäu in Bavaria, Germany. The town has a municipal association with Dirlewang.

It is located in Upper Swabia.

== Transportation ==
Stetten is served by the Buchloe-Memmingen railway.
