= Fellheim =

- Municipality
- Coat of arms

- Location of Fellheim within Unterallgäu district
- Interactive map of Fellheim
- Location within Germany Location within Bavaria
- Coordinates: 48°5′N 10°9′E
- Country: Germany
- State: Bavaria
- Admin. region: Schwaben
- District: Unterallgäu
- Municipal assoc.: Boos

Government
  - Mayor (2020–26): Reinhard Schaupp

Area
  - Total: 5.08 km^{2} (1.96 sq mi)
- Elevation: 566 m (1,857 ft)

Population (2025-12-31)
  - Total: 1,123
  - Density: 221/km^{2} (573/sq mi)
- Time zone: UTC+01:00 (CET)
  - Summer (DST): UTC+02:00 (CEST)
- Postal codes: 87748
- Dialling codes: 08335
- Vehicle registration: MN
- Website: www.vg-boos.de

Fellheim is a municipality in the district of Unterallgäu in Bavaria, Germany. The town has a municipal association with Boos, Bavaria.

== History ==
=== Early history ===
Fellheim is located along the former fortification line of the Danube–Iller–Rhine Limes, on the right side of the Iller between Kellmünz and Memmingen. After several changes in ownership, the Reichlin von Meldegg barons ultimately took ownership of Fellheim beginning on January 25, 1555, following the transfer of the feudal letter from the Princely Abbey of Kempten. Construction of their castle, Schloß Fellheim, began two years later in 1557. In 1620, the barony was granted the right to exercise high justice (Blutbann).

During the Thirty Years' War, the village was completely devastated and, from 1636 to 1643, no one lived in Fellheim. Only one farmer returned home following the war and the local lord, who had fled to Switzerland, returned to Fellheim in 1643. To increase the population, Baron Phillip Bernhard von Reichlin-Meldegg settled five Jewish families in Fellheim in 1670.

With the implementations of the Confederation of the Rhine in 1806, Fellheim became part of Bavaria. Subsequent administrative reforms in Bavaria established the current municipality of Fellheim in 1818.
