= Winterrieden =

- Municipality
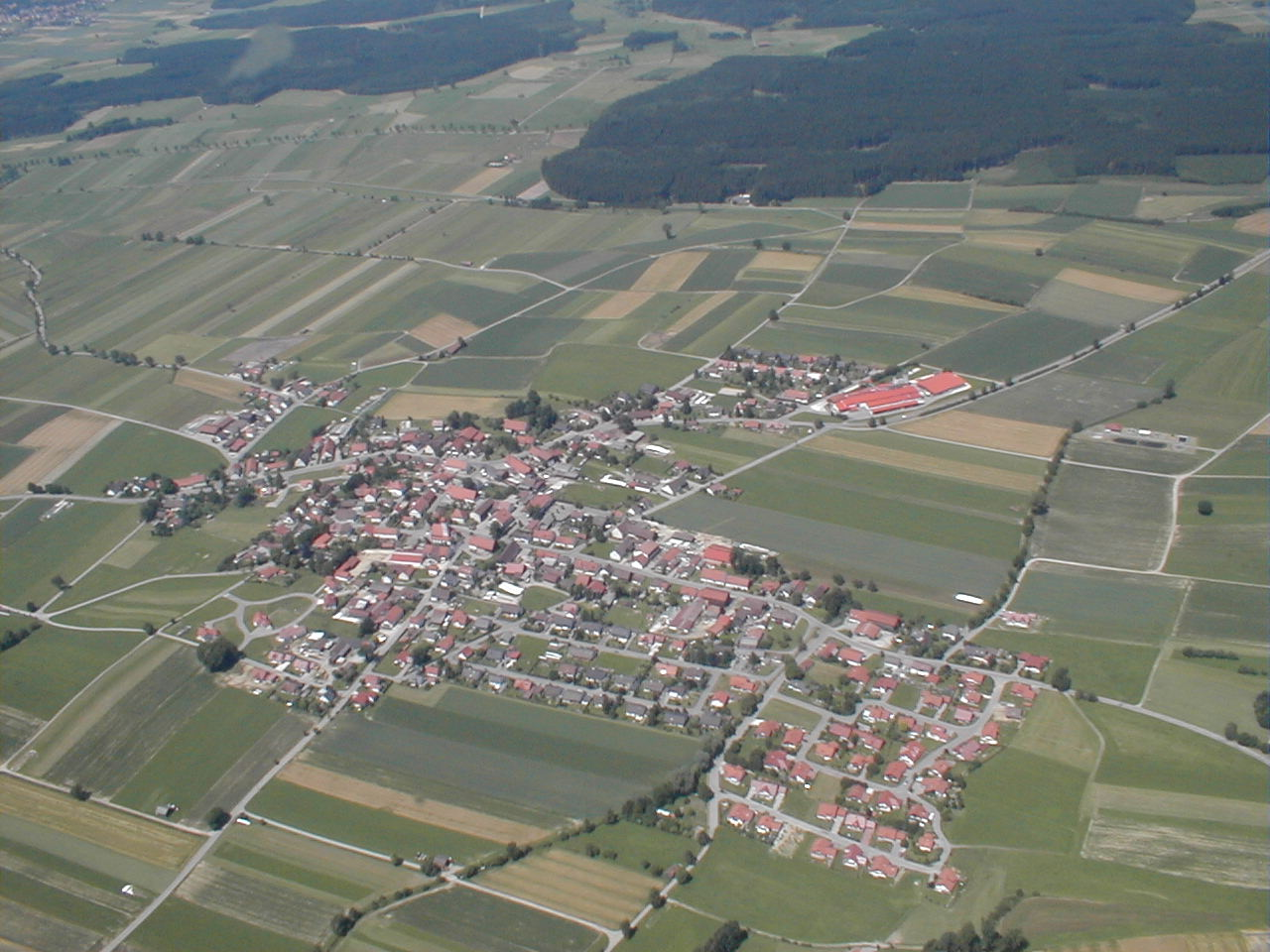

- Coat of arms

- Location of Winterrieden within Unterallgäu district
- Interactive map of Winterrieden
- Location within Germany Location within Bavaria
- Coordinates: 48°7′N 10°13′E
- Country: Germany
- State: Bavaria
- Admin. region: Schwaben
- District: Unterallgäu
- Municipal assoc.: Babenhausen

Government
  - Mayor (2020–26): Hans-Peter Mayer (CSU)

Area
  - Total: 9.79 km^{2} (3.78 sq mi)
- Elevation: 575 m (1,886 ft)

Population (2025-12-31)
  - Total: 936
  - Density: 95.6/km^{2} (248/sq mi)
- Time zone: UTC+01:00 (CET)
  - Summer (DST): UTC+02:00 (CEST)
- Postal codes: 87785
- Dialling codes: 08333
- Vehicle registration: MN
- Website: www.winterrieden.de

Winterrieden is a municipality in the district of Unterallgäu in Bavaria, Germany. The municipality has a municipal association with Babenhausen.
