= Apfeltrach =

- Municipality
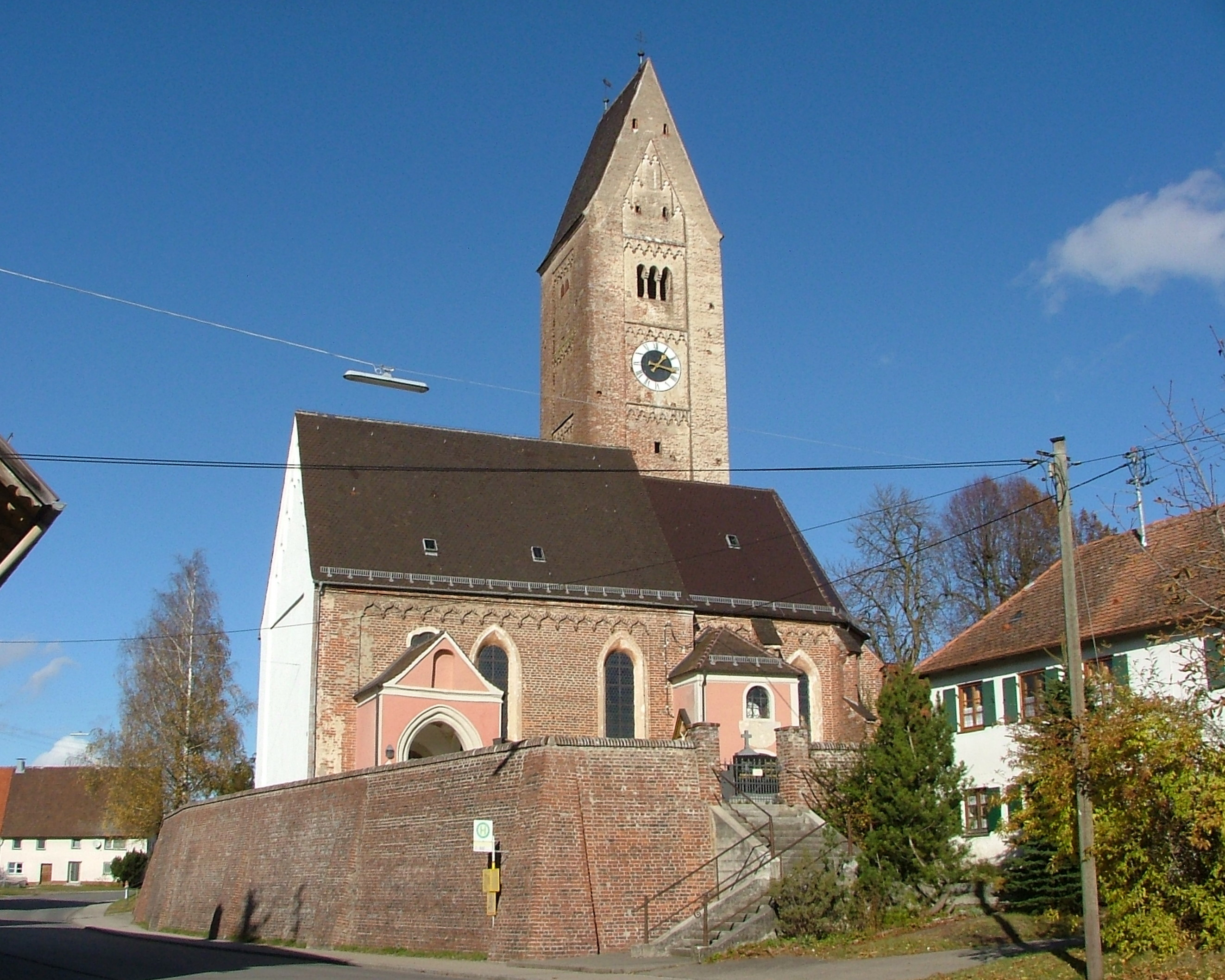
- Saint Bartholomew Church

- Coat of arms

- Location of Apfeltrach within Unterallgäu district
- Interactive map of Apfeltrach
- Location within Germany Location within Bavaria
- Coordinates: 48°1′N 10°30′E
- Country: Germany
- State: Bavaria
- Admin. region: Schwaben
- District: Unterallgäu
- Municipal assoc.: Dirlewang

Government
  - Mayor (2020–26): Karin Schmalholz

Area
  - Total: 15.03 km^{2} (5.80 sq mi)
- Elevation: 620 m (2,030 ft)

Population (2025-12-31)
  - Total: 991
  - Density: 65.9/km^{2} (171/sq mi)
- Time zone: UTC+01:00 (CET)
  - Summer (DST): UTC+02:00 (CEST)
- Postal codes: 87742
- Dialling codes: 08261
- Vehicle registration: MN
- Website: www.vg-dirlewang.de

Apfeltrach is a municipality in the district of Unterallgäu in Bavaria, Germany. The town has a municipal association with Dirlewang.
