= Oberrieden, Bavaria =

Oberrieden
- Municipality
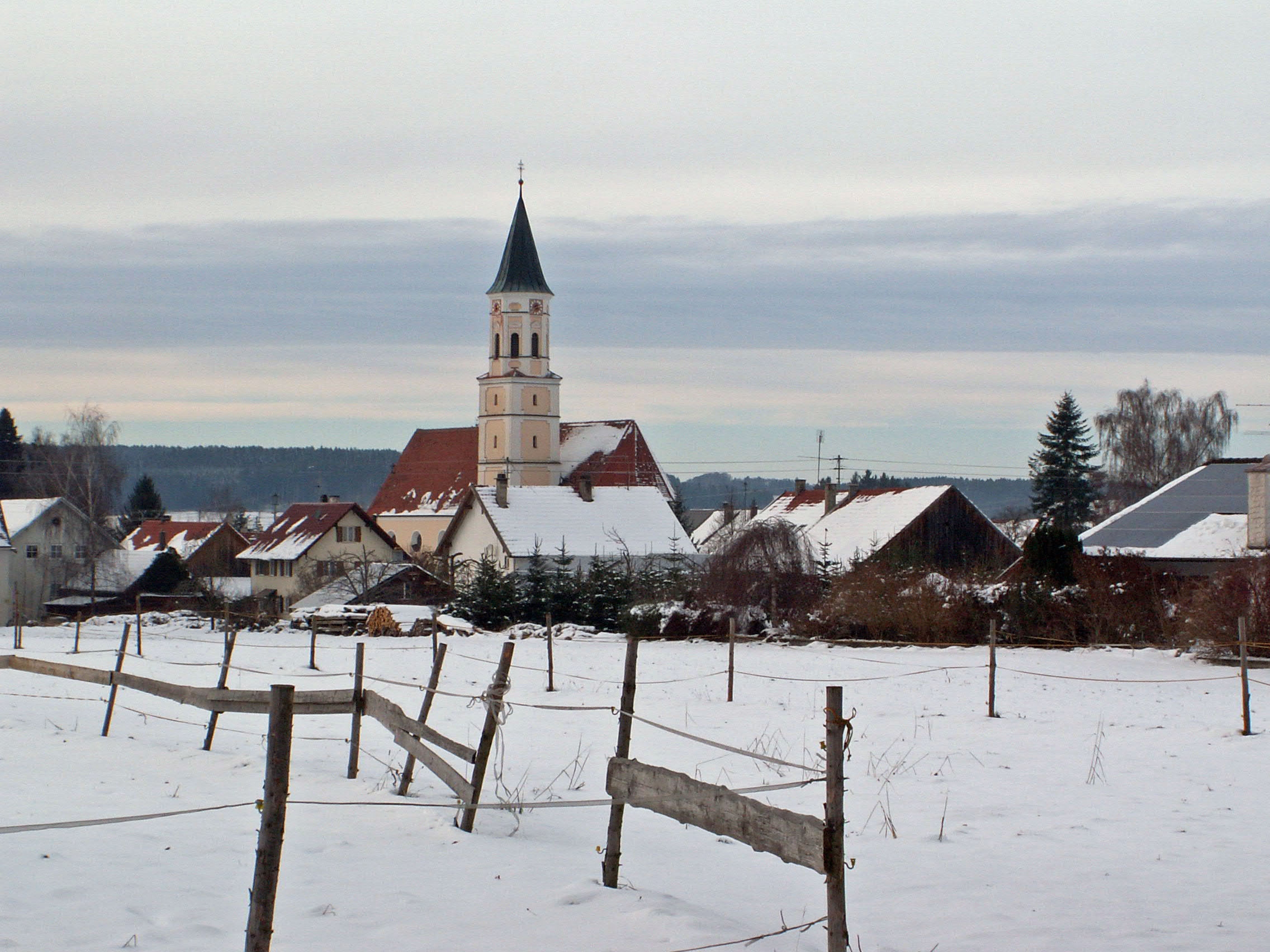
- Oberrieden seen form from the east

- Coat of arms

- Location of Oberrieden within Unterallgäu district
- Interactive map of Oberrieden
- Location within Germany Location within Bavaria
- Coordinates: 48°6′N 10°18′E
- Country: Germany
- State: Bavaria
- Admin. region: Schwaben
- District: Unterallgäu
- Municipal assoc.: Pfaffenhausen

Government
  - Mayor (2020–26): Robert Wilhelm (FW)

Area
  - Total: 20.82 km^{2} (8.04 sq mi)
- Elevation: 560–655 m (1,837–2,149 ft)

Population (2025-12-31)
  - Total: 1,202
  - Density: 57.73/km^{2} (149.5/sq mi)
- Time zone: UTC+01:00 (CET)
  - Summer (DST): UTC+02:00 (CEST)
- Postal codes: 87769
- Dialling codes: 08265
- Vehicle registration: MN
- Website: www.oberrieden.de

Oberrieden is a municipality in the district of Unterallgäu in Bavaria, Germany. The town has a municipal association with Pfaffenhausen.
