= Dirlewang (Verwaltungsgemeinschaft) =

- Verwaltungsgemeinschaft
- Location of Dirlewang within Unterallgäu district
- Interactive map of Dirlewang
- Location within Germany Location within Bavaria
- Coordinates: 48°00′N 10°30′E
- Country: Germany
- State: Bavaria
- Admin. region: Swabia
- District: Unterallgäu
- Seat: Dirlewang
- Subdivisions: 4 municipalities

Area
  - Total: 77.65 km^{2} (29.98 sq mi)

Population (2025-12-31)
  - Total: 6,167
  - Density: 79.42/km^{2} (205.7/sq mi)
- Time zone: UTC+01:00 (CET)
  - Summer (DST): UTC+02:00 (CEST)
- Website: www.vg-dirlewang.de

Dirlewang is a Verwaltungsgemeinschaft (municipal association) in the district of Unterallgäu in Bavaria, Germany. Its seat is in Dirlewang. It consists of the following municipalities:

1. Apfeltrach
2. Dirlewang
3. Stetten
4. Unteregg
