= Bad Grönenbach (Verwaltungsgemeinschaft) =

- Verwaltungsgemeinschaft
- Location of Bad Grönenbach within Unterallgäu district
- Interactive map of Bad Grönenbach
- Location within Germany Location within Bavaria
- Coordinates: 47°53′N 10°13′E
- Country: Germany
- State: Bavaria
- Admin. region: Swabia
- District: Unterallgäu
- Seat: Bad Grönenbach
- Subdivisions: 3 municipalities

Area
  - Total: 74 km^{2} (29 sq mi)

Population (2025-12-31)
  - Total: 9,974
  - Density: 130/km^{2} (350/sq mi)
- Time zone: UTC+01:00 (CET)
  - Summer (DST): UTC+02:00 (CEST)
- Website: www.bad-groenenbach.de

Bad Grönenbach is a Verwaltungsgemeinschaft (municipal association) in the district of Unterallgäu in Bavaria, Germany. Its seat is in Bad Grönenbach. It consists of the following municipalities:

1. Bad Grönenbach
2. Wolfertschwenden
3. Woringen
