= Babenhausen (Verwaltungsgemeinschaft) =

- Verwaltungsgemeinschaft
- Location of Babenhausen within Unterallgäu district
- Interactive map of Babenhausen
- Location within Germany Location within Bavaria
- Coordinates: 48°09′N 10°15′E
- Country: Germany
- State: Bavaria
- Admin. region: Swabia
- District: Unterallgäu
- Seat: Babenhausen
- Subdivisions: 6 municipalities

Area
  - Total: 134.69 km^{2} (52.00 sq mi)

Population (2025-12-31)
  - Total: 12,082
  - Density: 89.702/km^{2} (232.33/sq mi)
- Time zone: UTC+01:00 (CET)
  - Summer (DST): UTC+02:00 (CEST)
- Website: www.vg-babenhausen.de

Babenhausen is a Verwaltungsgemeinschaft (municipal association) in the district of Unterallgäu in Bavaria, Germany. Its seat is in Babenhausen. It consists of the following municipalities:

1. Babenhausen
2. Egg an der Günz
3. Kettershausen
4. Kirchhaslach
5. Oberschönegg
6. Winterrieden
