= Salgen =

- Municipality
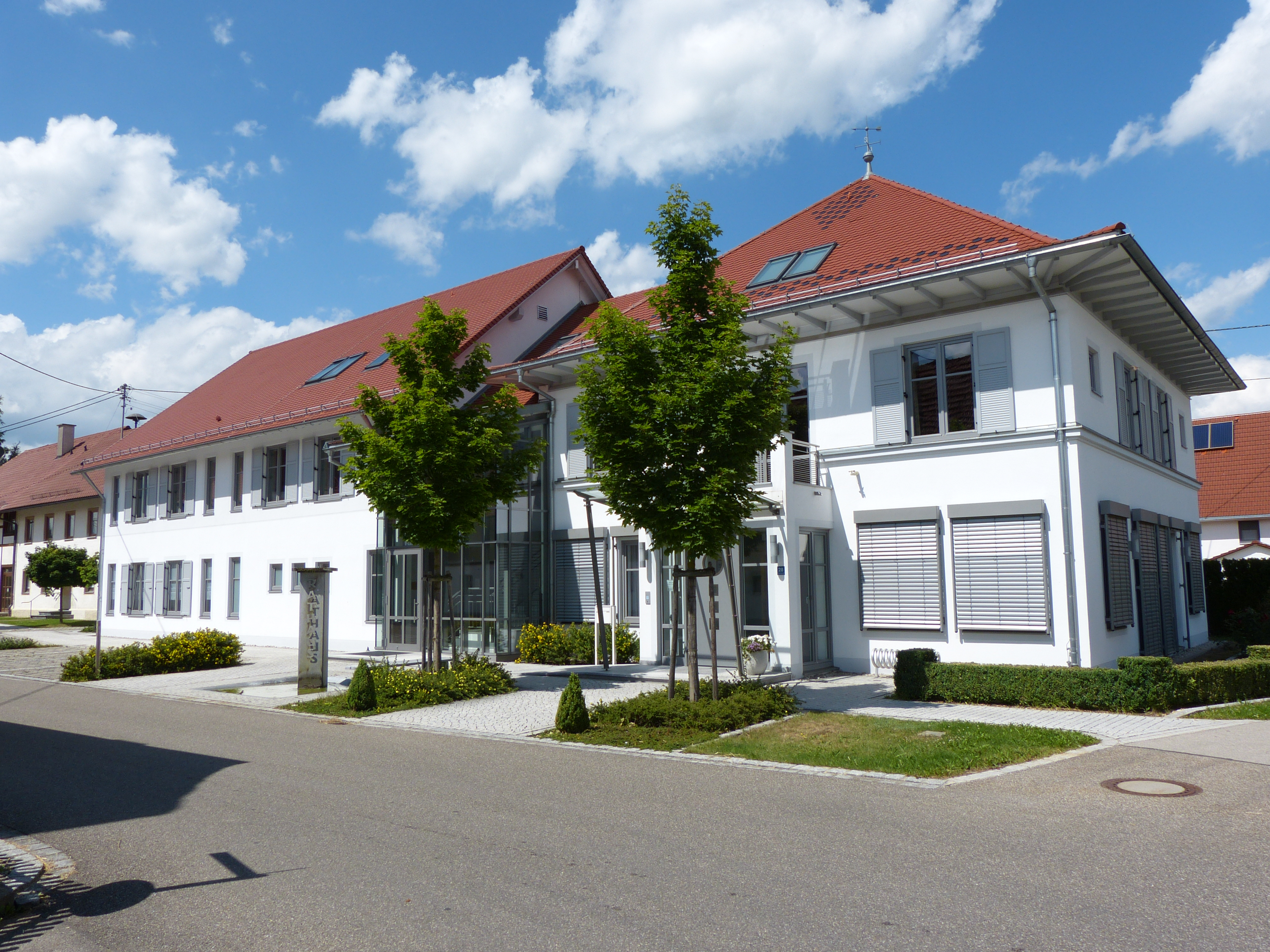
- Municipal office

- Coat of arms

- Location of Salgen within Unterallgäu district
- Interactive map of Salgen
- Location within Germany Location within Bavaria
- Coordinates: 48°8′N 10°29′E
- Country: Germany
- State: Bavaria
- Admin. region: Schwaben
- District: Unterallgäu
- Municipal assoc.: Pfaffenhausen

Government
  - Mayor (2020–26): Roland Hämmerle (FW)

Area
  - Total: 23.30 km^{2} (9.00 sq mi)
- Elevation: 558 m (1,831 ft)

Population (2025-12-31)
  - Total: 1,464
  - Density: 62.83/km^{2} (162.7/sq mi)
- Time zone: UTC+01:00 (CET)
  - Summer (DST): UTC+02:00 (CEST)
- Postal codes: 87775
- Dialling codes: 08265
- Vehicle registration: MN

Salgen is a municipality in the district of Unterallgäu in Bavaria, Germany. The town has a municipal association with Pfaffenhausen.
