= Pleß =

- Municipality
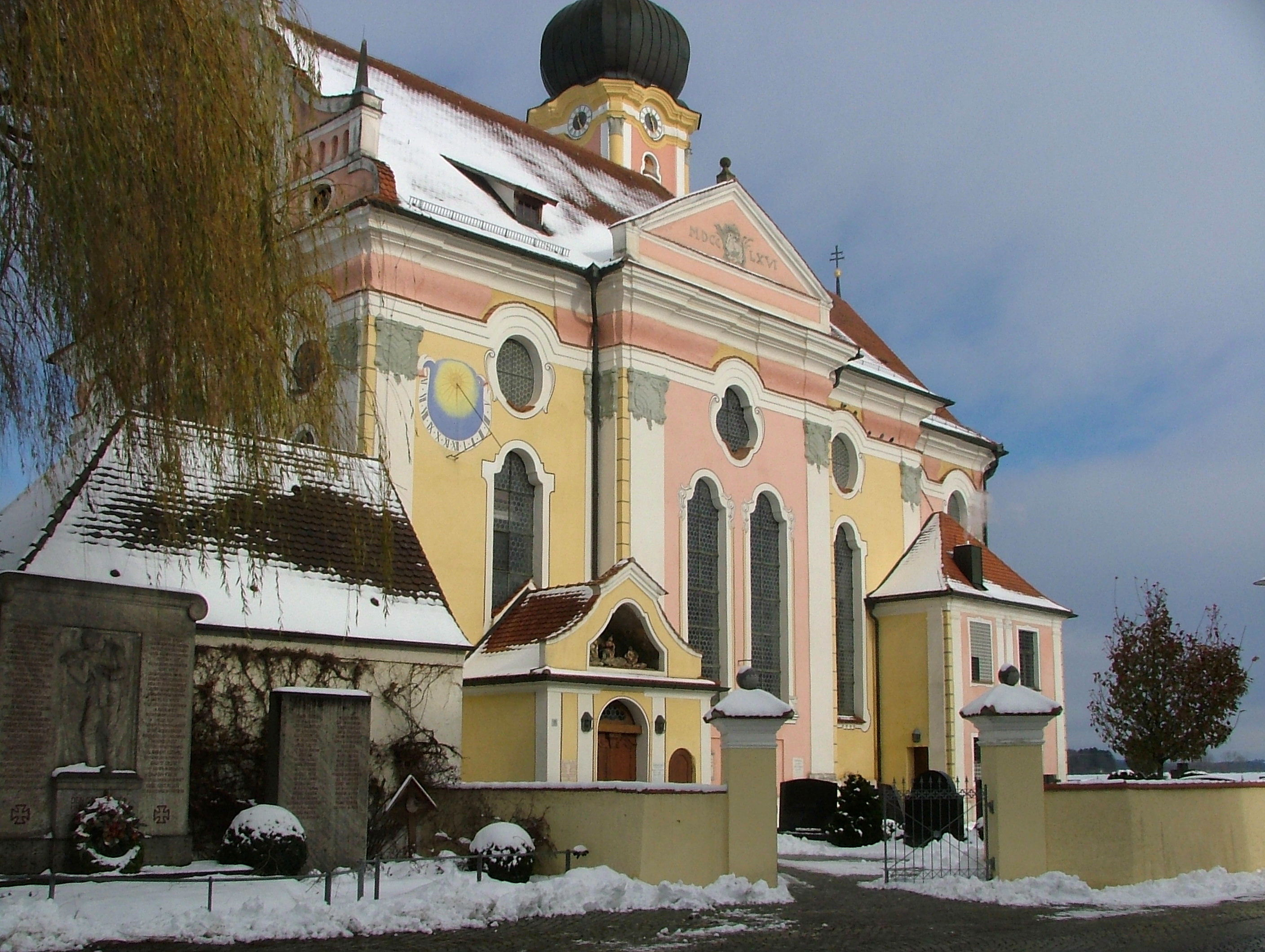
- Church of Saints Gordian and Epimachus

- Coat of arms

- Location of Pleß within Unterallgäu district
- Interactive map of Pleß
- Location within Germany Location within Bavaria
- Coordinates: 48°6′N 10°9′E
- Country: Germany
- State: Bavaria
- Admin. region: Schwaben
- District: Unterallgäu
- Municipal assoc.: Boos

Government
  - Mayor (2020–26): Anton Keller

Area
  - Total: 15.38 km^{2} (5.94 sq mi)
- Elevation: 558 m (1,831 ft)

Population (2025-12-31)
  - Total: 906
  - Density: 58.9/km^{2} (153/sq mi)
- Time zone: UTC+01:00 (CET)
  - Summer (DST): UTC+02:00 (CEST)
- Postal codes: 87773
- Dialling codes: 08335
- Vehicle registration: MN
- Website: www.vg-boos.de/p-1.htm

Pleß is a municipality in the district of Unterallgäu in Bavaria, Germany. The town is part of the municipal association of Boos.
