= Breitenbrunn, Swabia =

Breitenbrunn
- Municipality
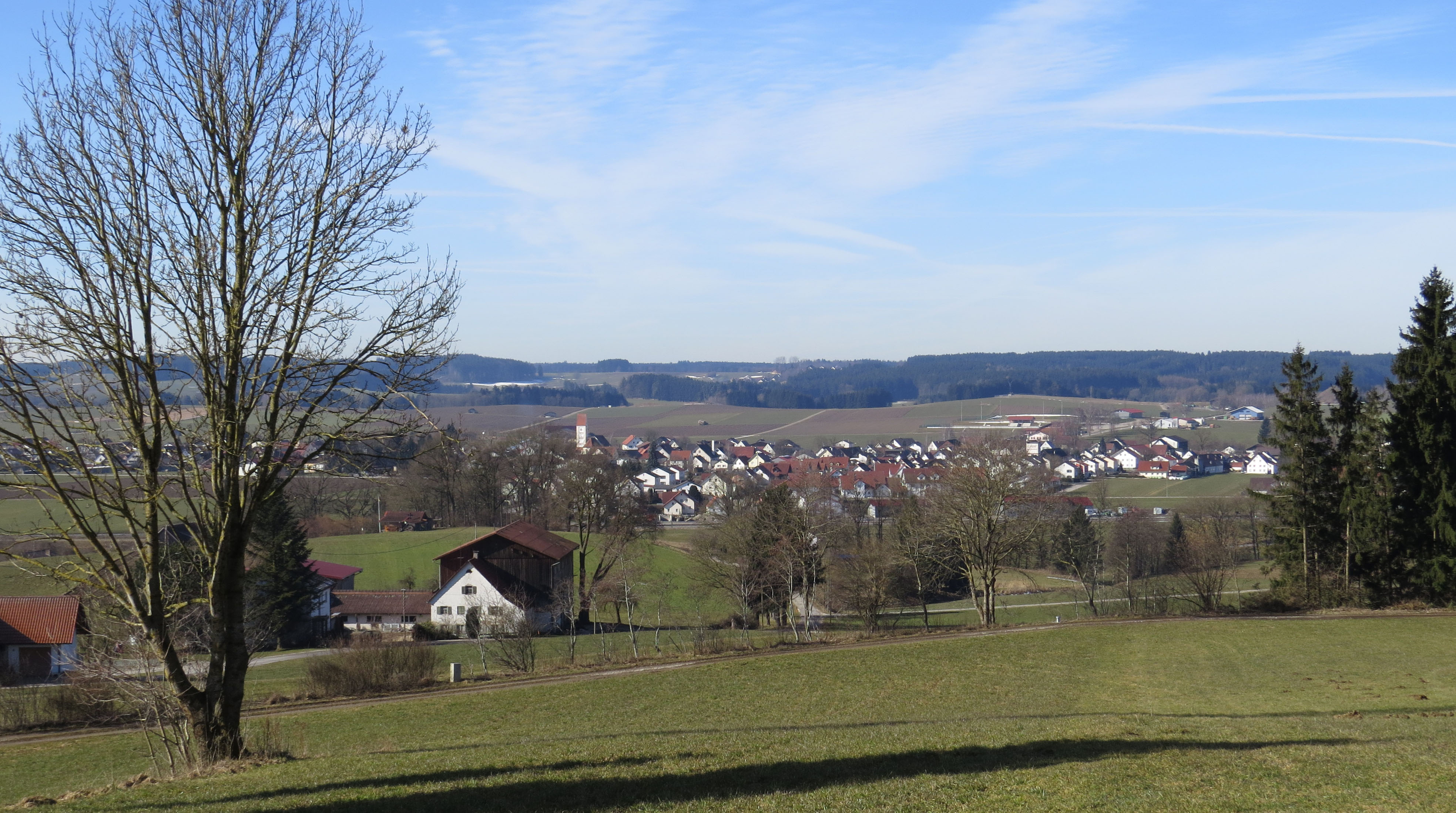
- Breitenbrunn seen from the east

- Coat of arms

- Location of Breitenbrunn within Unterallgäu district
- Interactive map of Breitenbrunn
- Location within Germany Location within Bavaria
- Coordinates: 48°08′N 10°23′E
- Country: Germany
- State: Bavaria
- Admin. region: Schwaben
- District: Unterallgäu
- Municipal assoc.: Pfaffenhausen
- Subdivisions: 9 Ortsteile

Government
  - Mayor (2020–26): Jürgen Tempel

Area
  - Total: 41.89 km^{2} (16.17 sq mi)
- Elevation: 552 m (1,811 ft)

Population (2025-12-31)
  - Total: 2,322
  - Density: 55.43/km^{2} (143.6/sq mi)
- Time zone: UTC+01:00 (CET)
  - Summer (DST): UTC+02:00 (CEST)
- Postal codes: 87739
- Dialling codes: 08263
- Vehicle registration: MN

Breitenbrunn (German pronunciation: [ˈbʁaɪtn̩ˌbʁʊn]) is a municipality in the district of Unterallgäu in Bavaria, Germany. The town has a municipal association with Pfaffenhausen.
