= Ettringen, Bavaria =

Ettringen
- Municipality
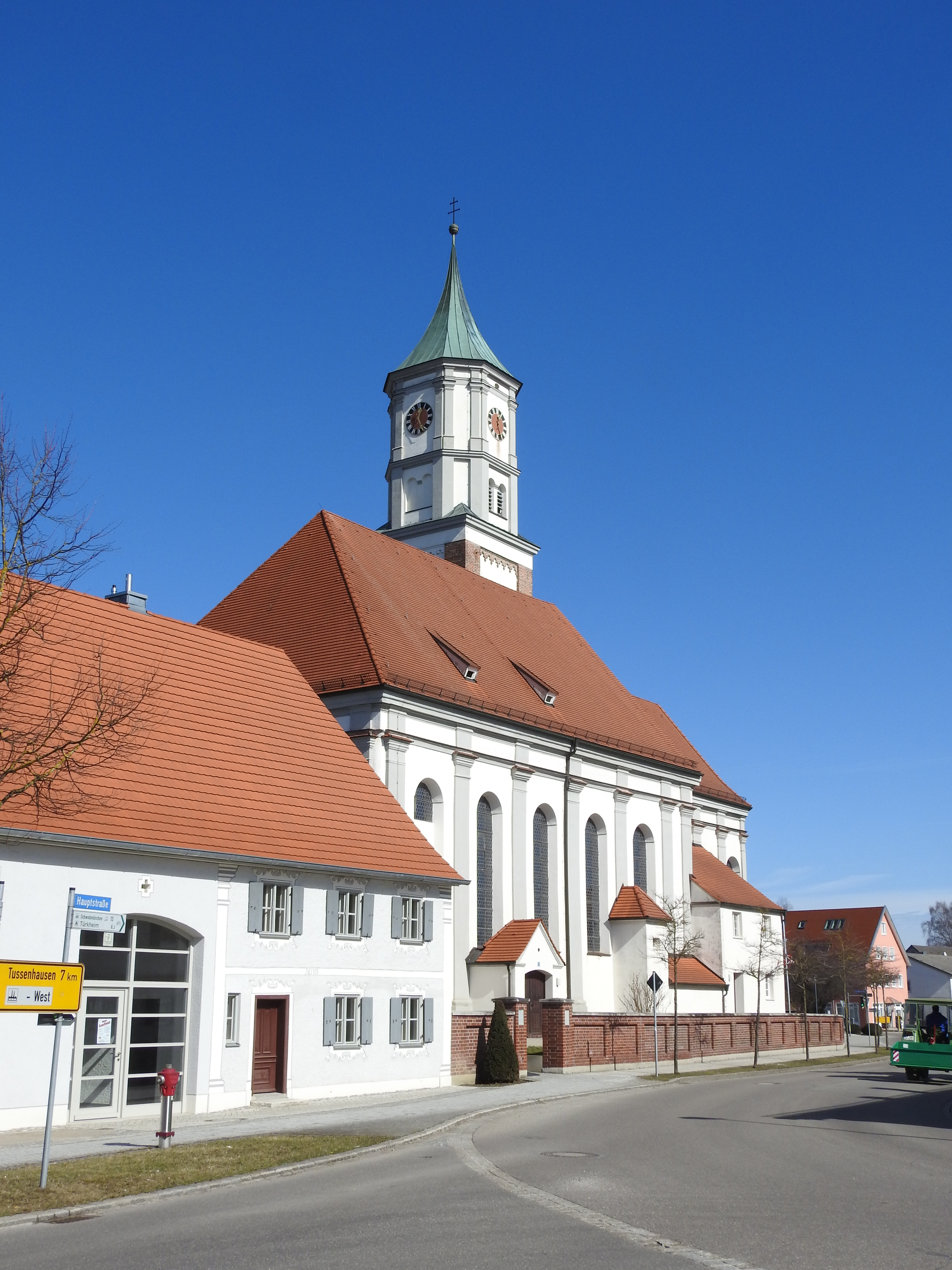
- Main street and the parish church

- Coat of arms

- Location of Ettringen within Unterallgäu district
- Interactive map of Ettringen
- Location within Germany Location within Bavaria
- Coordinates: 48°6′N 10°39′E
- Country: Germany
- State: Bavaria
- Admin. region: Schwaben
- District: Unterallgäu

Government
  - Mayor (2020–26): Robert Sturm

Area
  - Total: 41.5 km^{2} (16.0 sq mi)
- Elevation: 581 m (1,906 ft)

Population (2025-12-31)
  - Total: 3,476
  - Density: 83.8/km^{2} (217/sq mi)
- Time zone: UTC+01:00 (CET)
  - Summer (DST): UTC+02:00 (CEST)
- Postal codes: 86833
- Dialling codes: 08249
- Vehicle registration: MN
- Website: www.ettringen.de

Ettringen (German pronunciation: [ˈɛtʁɪŋən]) is a municipality in the district of Unterallgäu in Bavaria, Germany.
