= Babenhausen, Bavaria =

Babenhausen
- Municipality
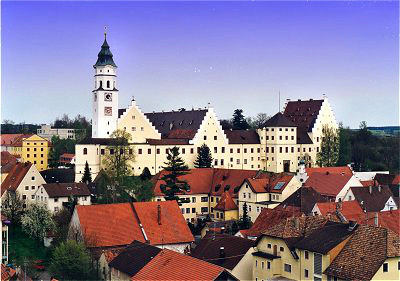
- Babenhausen and the Fugger Castle

- Coat of arms

- Location of Babenhausen within Unterallgäu district
- Interactive map of Babenhausen
- Location within Germany Location within Bavaria
- Coordinates: 48°9′N 10°15′E
- Country: Germany
- State: Bavaria
- Admin. region: Schwaben
- District: Unterallgäu
- Municipal assoc.: Babenhausen

Government
  - Mayor (2020–26): Otto Göppel (CSU)

Area
  - Total: 27.23 km^{2} (10.51 sq mi)
- Elevation: 542–567 m (1,778–1,860 ft)

Population (2025-12-31)
  - Total: 5,694
  - Density: 209.1/km^{2} (541.6/sq mi)
- Time zone: UTC+01:00 (CET)
  - Summer (DST): UTC+02:00 (CEST)
- Postal codes: 87727
- Dialling codes: 08333
- Vehicle registration: MN
- Website: www.babenhausen -schwaben.de

Babenhausen (German pronunciation: [baːbm̩ˈhaʊzn̩]) is a municipality in the district of Unterallgäu in Bavaria, Germany. It is seat of a municipal association with Egg an der Günz, Kettershausen, Kirchhaslach, Oberschönegg and Winterrieden. The view of Babenhausen is dominated by the Fugger Castle, a local attraction with a museum, and the Sankt Andreas Church. It is the seat of the Fuggers, a merchant family from Augsburg which played an important role during the Middle Ages and the Renaissance.

== History ==
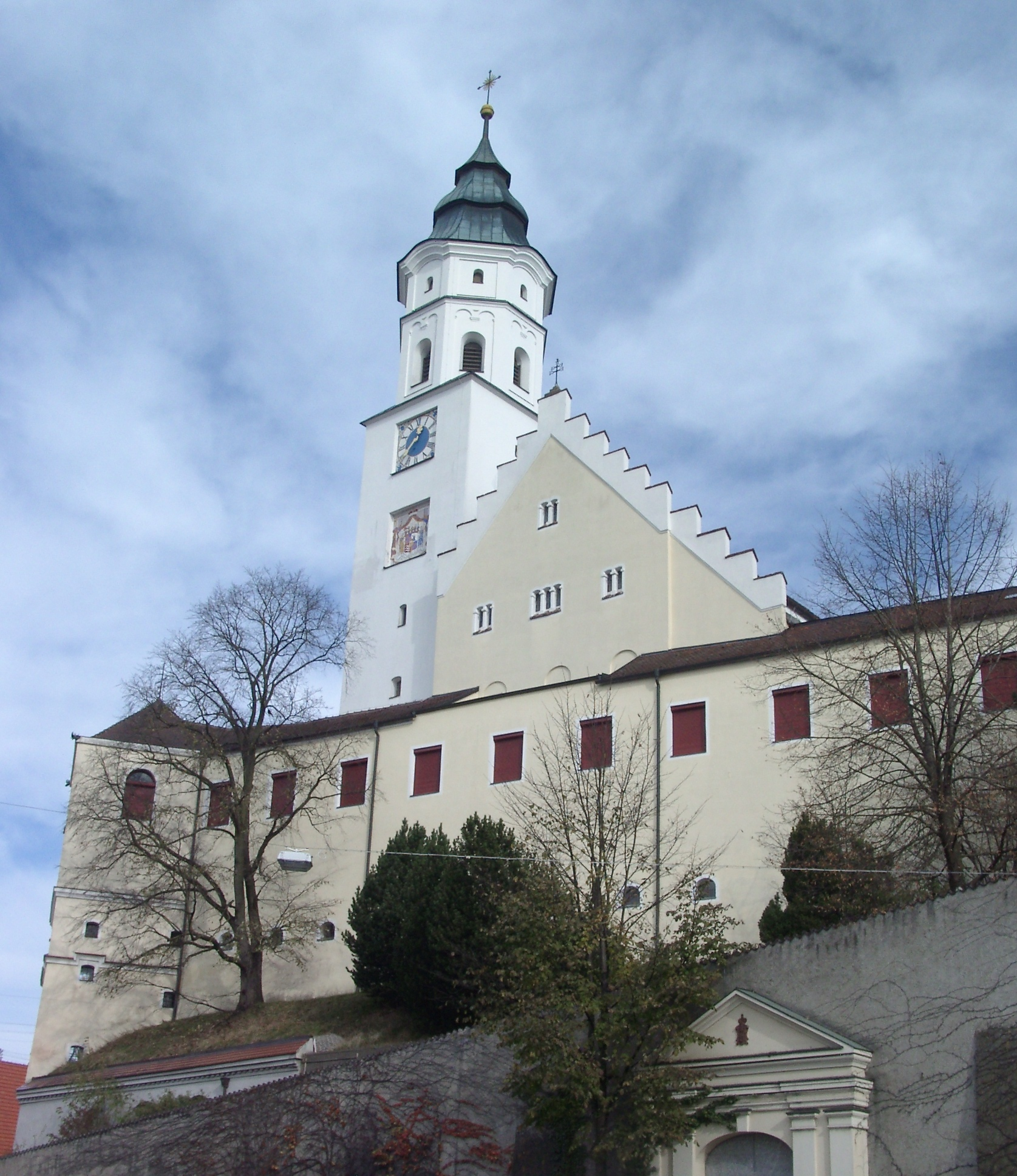
Fugger Castle and Sankt Andreas Church overlooking Babenhausen

Babenhausen was first mentioned in a document related to a boundary conflict in 1237. Municipal rights can be traced back to 1315, and in 1337, Emperor Ludwig IV awarded the city with the town charter of Ulm. Babenhausen finally lost its municipal rights after the Rottweiler verdict in 1466.

The castle and its lordship were purchased by Anton Fugger in 1539. Babenhausen became an Imperial Principality in 1803. As an effect of the Rheinbund act, the city was integrated into the Kingdom of Bavaria in 1806. The castle is still in the Fugger family and owned by the current Prince Fugger of Babenhausen (Fürst Fugger von Babenhausen).

Babenhausen was connected to the railway in 1894 (Illertalbahn), but local public transportation on this route was discontinued in 1964. The railway embankment now provides a bicycle path. Today, the town is known as Markt Babenhausen.
