= Madlener =

Madlener is a surname. Notable people with the surname include:

- Barry Madlener (born 1969), Dutch politician of the Party for Freedom (PVV)
- Elaine Madlener (1912–1989), manuscript and autograph collector
- Josef Madlener (1881–1967), German artist and illustrator

== See also ==
- Madlener House, also known as Albert F. Madlener House, is a Prairie School house located at 4 West Burton Street in Chicago, Illinois, United States
