= Amendingen (Memmingen) =

District of Memmingen in Bavaria

- Town of Memmingen
- Coat of arms

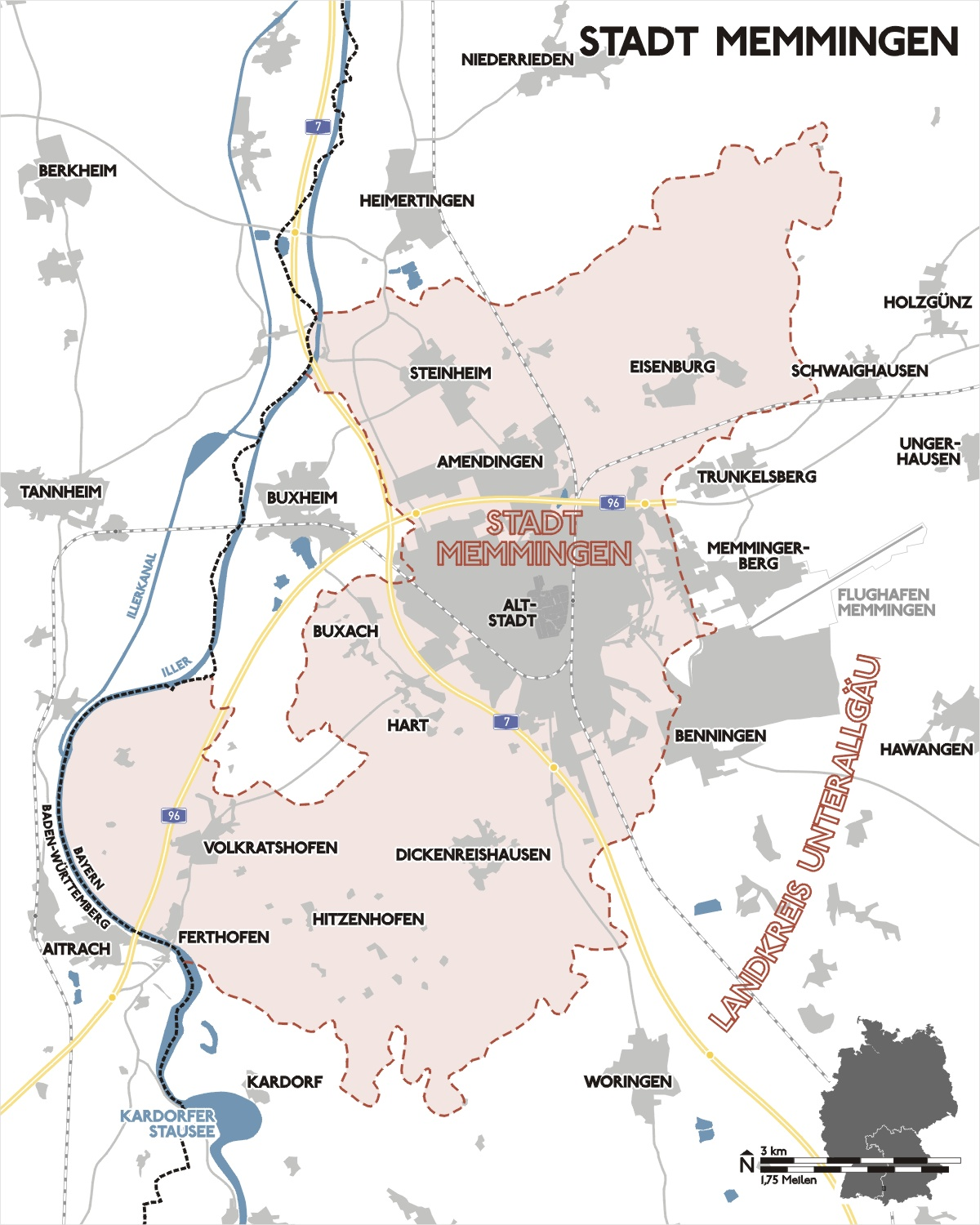
- Districts of Memmingen
- Interactive map of Amendingen
- Location within Germany Location within Bavaria
- Coordinates: 48°0′18″N 10°10′45″E
- Country: Germany
- State: Bavaria
- City: Memmingen
- Founded: 1972-07-01

Area
  - Total: 7.1 km^{2} (2.7 sq mi)
- Elevation: 585 m (1,919 ft)

Population (2018-12-31)
  - Total: 3,714
  - Density: 520/km^{2} (1,400/sq mi)
- Time zone: UTC+01:00 (CET)
  - Summer (DST): UTC+02:00 (CEST)
- Postal codes: 87700
- Dialling codes: 08331

Amendingen (Swabian: Aumadenga) is a district and parish village of the independent city of Memmingen in Bavaria. The first settlement dates back to before 233. The village was first documented in 1180 and belonged to the rule of the Knights of Eisenburg until 1455. From 1475, the village was divided among various ruling dynasties and monasteries. In 1803 the present parish was established with the Imperial Delegation.

Amendingen was an independent municipality from 1805 until it was incorporated into Memmingen in 1972. With a population of over 3700, Amendingen is the largest district after Memmingen. The former parish village is best known for its baroque St. Ulrich's Church and the northern industrial park, which is largely located on Amendingen's land.

== Geography ==
=== Location ===
The district of Amendingen in Memmingen is located on the western edge of the Memminger Ach. The village is located north of Memmingen's city center and has grown together with it. Most of the northern industrial area is located in the north of Amendingen.

=== Climate ===
Amendingen's average annual temperature and precipitation are about average for the temperate climate, with precipitation usually slightly higher and minimum temperatures slightly lower. The Memminger Ach, which flows through the village, and the nearby Weidenbach stream can cause dense fog on the fields and in the village in spring and fall. The coldest month is January with an average daily minimum temperature of −5 °C and an average daily maximum temperature of 2 °C. The warmest months are July and August with an average minimum temperature of 12 °C and an average maximum temperature of 24 °C.

=== Geology ===
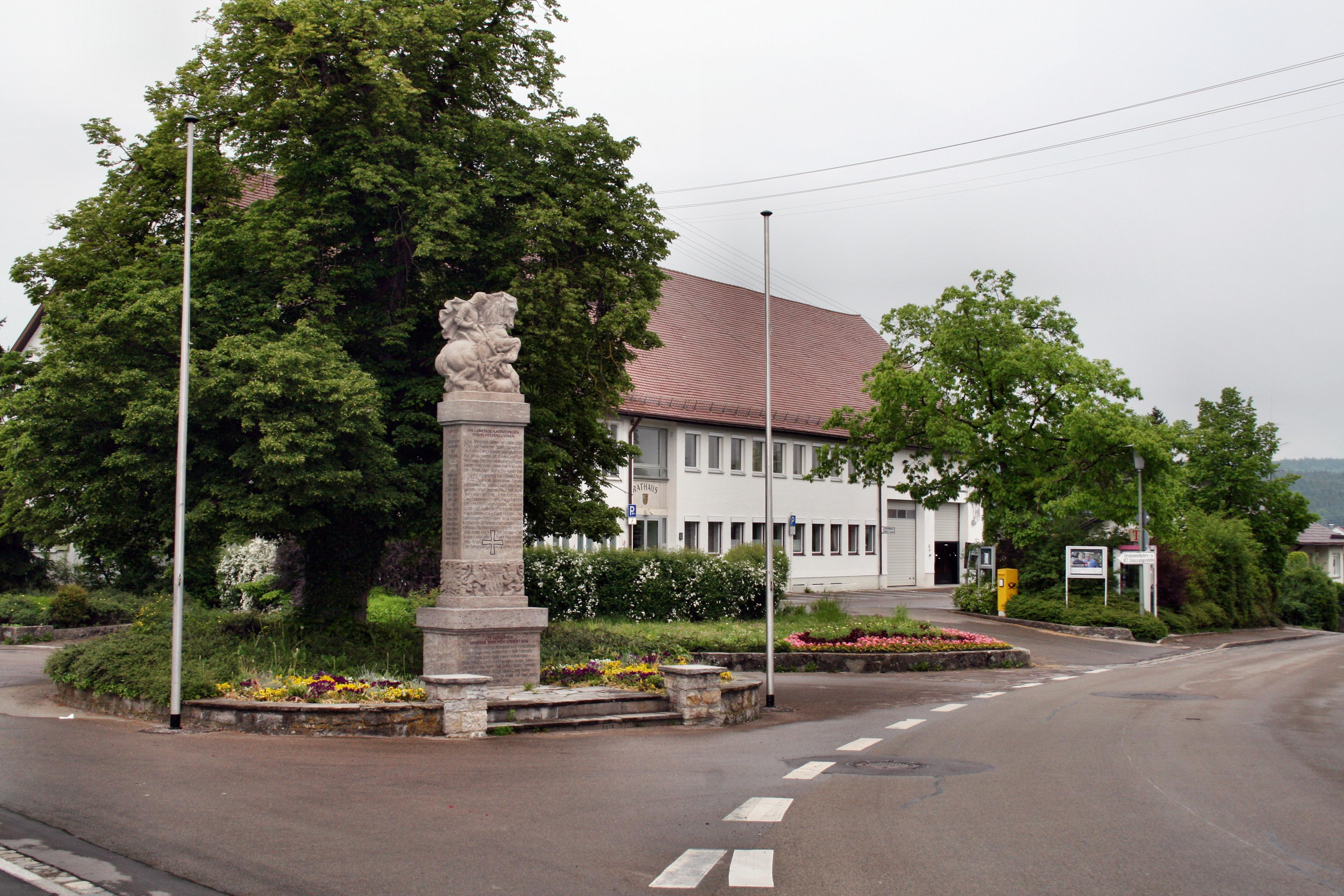
Amendingen war memorial with the former town hall in the background

The subsoil consists of a layer of loess about one meter thick, under which lies about 20 meters of crushed stone. The valley floor to the east of the community consists of alpine soil and underlying peat deposits, occasionally mixed with gravel and gray-black sand. In particular, the regulated course of the Memminger Ach marks the approximate boundary between alpine soil and gravel. At the edge of the valley, there is a tertiary deposit that favors the abundant occurrence of springs down to Heimertingen.

== History ==
=== Early history (until the 8th century AD) ===
During the Roman Empire, the road from Kempten (Allgäu) (Cambodunum) to Kellmünz (Caelius Mons) probably ran through the Amendingen district. Remains of Roman walls were repeatedly discovered in the town area during several new buildings and renovations. In 1943 and 1954, remains from the 2nd and 3rd century AD were discovered. In the south of the present commune, a retired veteran probably built a manor house, a so-called villa rustica. Archaeological excavations around 1830 and in the early 1960s revealed that the courtyard covered an area of about ninety by ninety meters. It was destroyed by fire and rebuilt at least three times. Craftsmen's houses were probably also connected to the courtyard, as suggested by the discovery of a weaving weight. When the Germanic tribes first overran the Limes north of the Danube in 233, the Roman estate was probably destroyed for the first time.

The core of the village of Amendingen, southwest of the church, was probably founded in the course of the Alemannic occupation in the 5th/6th century. An Alemannic settlement route from Heimertingen to Memmingerberg, which followed the course of the Ach, may have been decisive. The old Roman road certainly also played a role in the settlement. As in Memmingen, the place name is composed of a personal name and the suffix -ing. The leader of the tribe was probably called Otmund. Later it became Otmundingen, today Amendingen. The land of the oldest village originally included parts of the Memminger Ach and the fields reclaimed from the Roman estate. During excavations by the Antiquities Society of Memmingen around 1830, a stone slab grave was found, which is now located on the south side of the Memmingen forest cemetery. Due to the lack of grave goods, it is assumed that the grave was built before the year 751, during the Merovingian period. A wall made of tuff, the same material as the burial box, was also excavated. Brick finds showed that the wall and the other finds, except the tombs, date from the Roman period. Further excavations revealed that the pagan inhabitants of Amendingen had built their graves near the destroyed Roman courtyard. The dead lay with their heads facing east. The first church in Amendingen was built around the year 800, probably as a simple wooden structure. The dead were buried in the adjacent cemetery.

=== Ottobeuren Abbey and property of secular lords ===
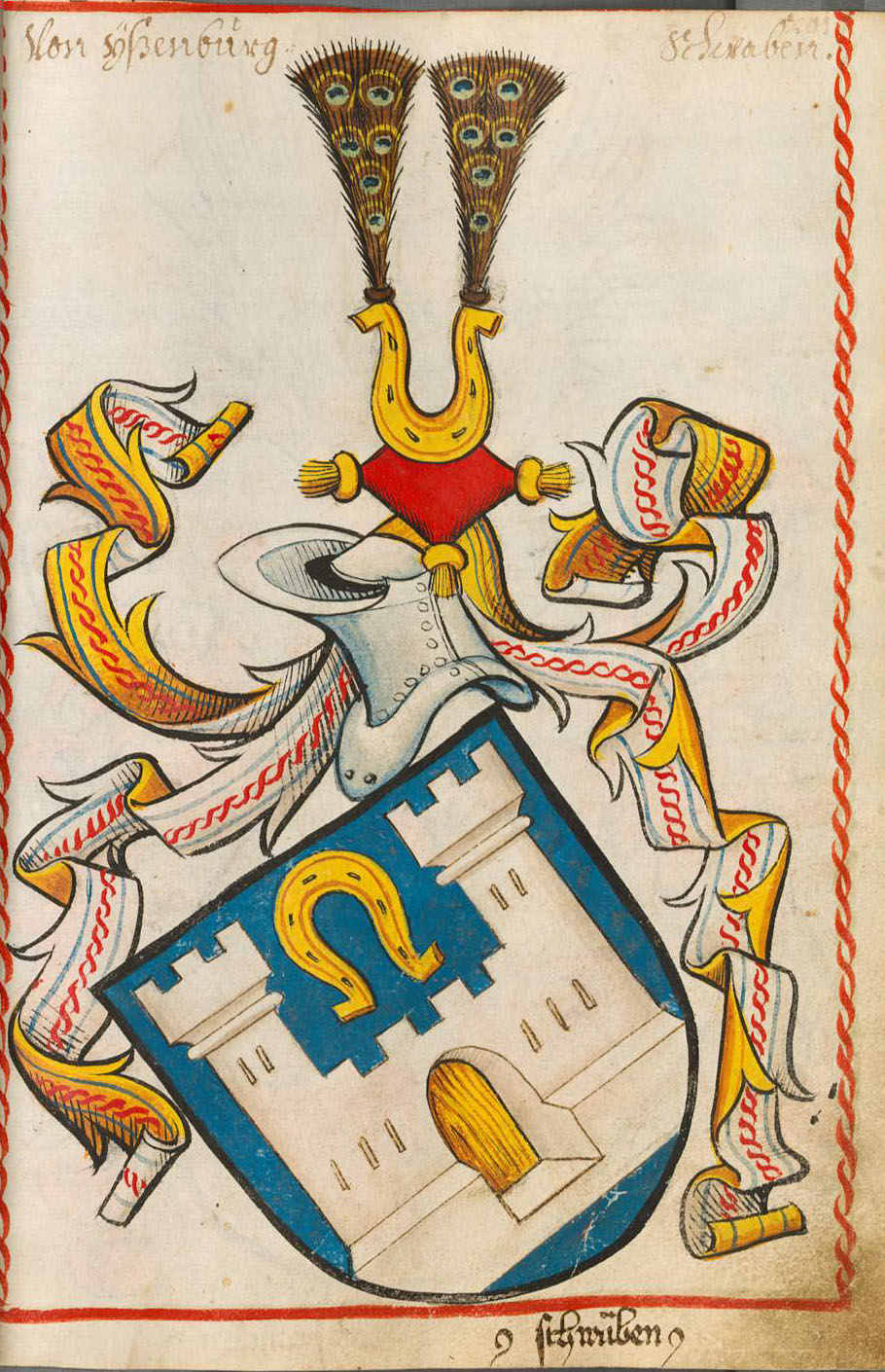
Coat of arms of the Lords of Eisenburg

The Chronicon ottenburanum, a collection of copies of older documents from around 1180, mentions the village of Amendingen with all its possessions (and the people belonging to it) - villam Oumintingen cum pertinentiis suis - as an endowment in the deed of foundation of Ottobeuren Abbey. The copy reproduces the content of a document from 764, which is considered authentic but has been lost. A document from 972 attests to a cession of territory by Ottobeuren Abbey, although its authenticity is disputed. The early 12th century copy mentions Amendingen as oppidum Oumintingen cum vico suo Trunkenesperc. In it, Emperor Otto I enfeoffed the Alemannic Duke Burchard III of Swabia with lands that the Ottobeuren monastery had ceded to the emperor in order to free him from the duties of military service, military duty and court storage. The earliest surviving written mention of Amendingen is in the Vita of St. Ulrich, written by the Augsburg cathedral provost Gerhard in 982/992, who, on his return journey from Upper Swabian Obersulmetingen to Augsburg in May 973, met with monks from the nearby monastery in Amendingen to inform them of the imperial privilege of a free abbacy.

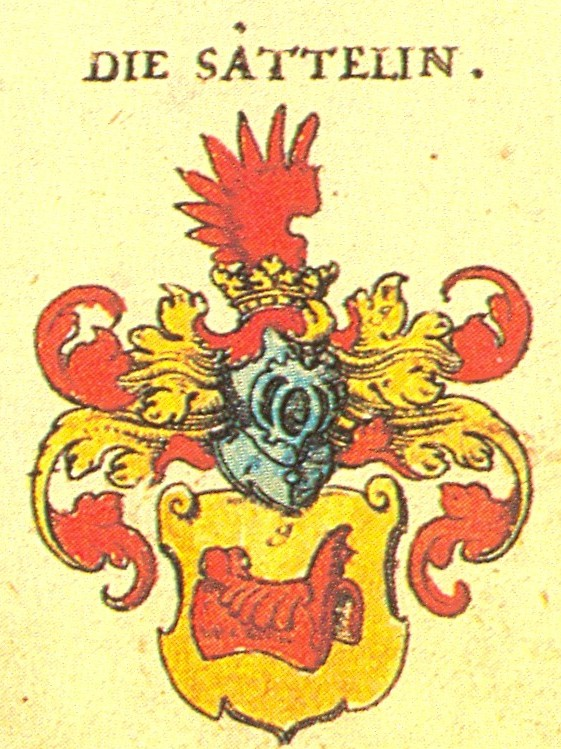
Coat of arms of the Sättelin, who owned a large part of the village

Around 1200, Amendingen passed into the hands of the Knights of Eisenburg, who had taken over the military duties in the area from the Dukes of Swabia and thus became the economic center of this dominion. Ecclesiastically, the village belonged to the Rot an der Rot Abbey since 1341. The last knight of Eisenburg sold his dominion.

=== Ownership of Memmingen and the Protestant-Catholic conflict ===
In 1455, Amendingen came into the possession of the patrician family Sättelin from Memmingen, and later a large part of the village came into the possession of other Memmingen burghers, who are commemorated by street names (Marquard, Spichel, Waimer, Zehender). In 1580, the village, along with other places, became the property of the neighboring imperial city of Memmingen. From 1586 the city also had high jurisdiction over the village. Twenty-one years later, in 1601, the Ulm citizen and patrician Hans Eitel Neubronner acquired the entire Eisenburg estate. The Sättelins, as citizens of Memmingen, had become Protestant during the Reformation, and the Neubronners, as their successors, had also accepted the new doctrine as citizens of Ulm. Although the lordship was now Protestant, the advocate above the lordship was Catholic. This led to differences that resulted in a treaty in 1586, thirty years after the Peace of Augsburg. Church records show that one hundred and fifty of the six hundred subjects remained Catholic. The treaty stipulated that the lords of Eisenburg could remain Protestant, but the subjects were to remain in the old Catholic religion. If they had adopted the new denomination, they were allowed to keep it for a further eight years. After that, the subjects had to return to the old religion under threat of punishment. The pastor at the time, Gallus Möslin, managed to convert most of them before the deadline expired. However, those who wanted to remain in the new faith moved to the Protestant town of Steinheim or Memmingen.

During the Reformation, the first Jews also settled in Amendingen and other places in the Eisenburg dominion, as the imperial cities did not provide them with housing. Since many of the Jews were involved in trade, there were soon minor disputes and several lawsuits between the city of Memmingen and Sebastian von Berwang as the owner of the Eisenburg dominion. In 1573, 83 craftsmen from Memmingen were listed in the debt register of the Jews of Amendingen. From 1600 there was no more Jewish population in Amendingen, as most of them moved to Fellheim, where they were under the protection of the local lord. When the Neubronner family bought the lordship of Amendingen in 1601, it was agreed in the purchase contract that no more Jews would be accepted. As the new owners of the manor, the Neubronner family sought to establish order through contracts and agreements. They defined the rights and duties of the sacristan and the teacher and made an agreement with the Rot an der Rot Abbey about the tithes in Amendingen.

During the Thirty Years' War, imperial and Swedish troops were quartered here, and the population suffered as a result. The former St. Ottilien Chapel was the site of a clash between the two warring parties. The parish registers show that the dead were buried in front of the chapel.

The plague also raged in the Memmingen area in 1635. However, it is not known to what extent Amendingen was affected. The most important consequence of the war was that on July 16, 1642, the Abbey of Rot sold the patronage right with the tithe and other properties in Amendingen to the Buxheim Charterhouse. The church in Amendingen was destroyed in 1655 when the tower collapsed. This event led to the construction of a temporary building, which was consecrated in 1661. In 1671 the property was divided into twelve parts by the heirs of the Neubronner family. Although an administrator was appointed for all twelve parts, disputes soon arose. In 1705 the majority was sold to the Memmingen Unterhospital.

Construction of the present church began in 1752, with the chancel facing north instead of east. The building was completed in 1754 and consecrated on October 12, 1755.

=== 19th century until the Second World War ===
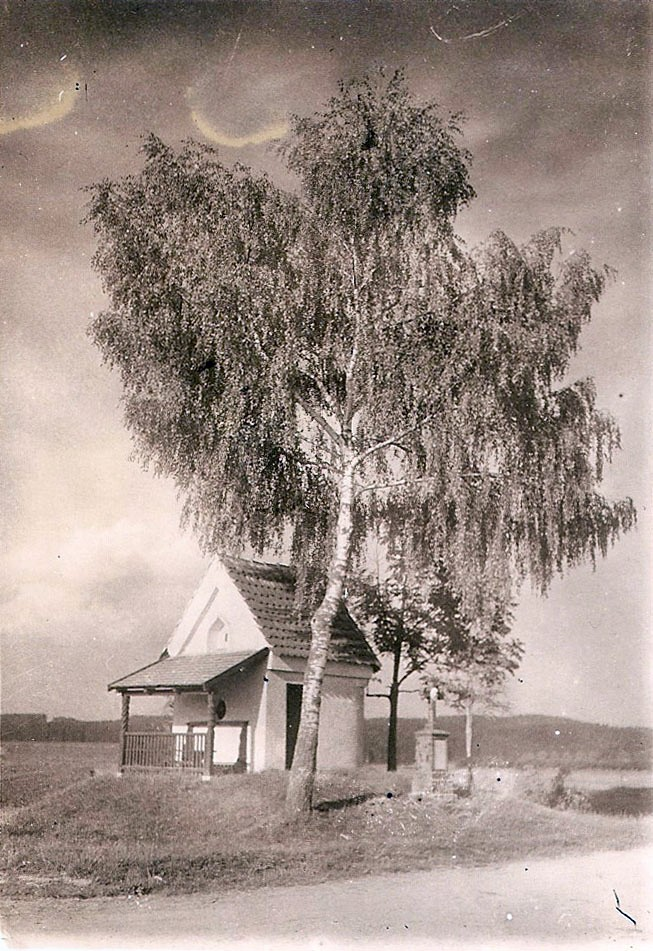
The Ottilien Chapel on the outskirts of the village around 1930

The village remained under the rule of Eisenburg until 1805. After the Treaty of Lunéville gave the Electorate of Bavaria sovereignty over the Swabian territories, the Crown of Bavaria officially assumed sovereignty in Amendingen on December 31, 1805, at two o'clock in the afternoon. It became an independent Bavarian community. Since then, Amendingen has also included the land towards Eisenburg and Grünenfurt Castle.

In 1866, a catastrophe occurred in Amendingen. It went down in history as The Great Fire of Amendingen. The Memmingen weekly newspaper of October 3, 1866 (No. 79) reported the following:

"On Sunday, September 23, when the people were in church, and on Tuesday, September 25, when the farmers were working in the fields, a large fire broke out in Amendingen, killing 15 people. The fire is said to have started in the butcher's shop (house no. 17) by children setting fire to it, and to have flared up again on Tuesday despite the fire watch. Eleven families, including many children, were left homeless."

Since the houses at that time were built almost entirely of wood and had thatched roofs, the fire was able to spread quickly. The size of the fire can be seen from the fact that 20 fire brigades fought it. As a result of the fire, the entire townscape changed. Reconstruction was also carried out to prevent such a disaster in the future. Some farms were moved or relocated to loosen up the buildings. The fact that the relocation required notarized contracts is the only reason we know today that seven farms and houses burned down. There is no information about other houses that burned down.

Johann Dirr took over the office of mayor from his father in 1904. He managed the affairs of Amendingen for more than 40 years, including during the First and Second World Wars.

At the beginning of World War I, Amendingen had about 700 inhabitants. After the war, many workers, civil servants and craftsmen settled in the area due to its proximity to Memmingen. Favored by this influx, two main political currents gradually formed in the village. The larger group was the Christian middle class of the Bavarian People's Party and the Center. This was joined by the socialist left of the working class (Social Democrats and Communists). The Bavarian Peasants' League, as a loose right-wing interest group, was also strongly represented. Because of the conflicting political opinions, there were often disputes within the village. The existence of two sports clubs, the Catholic Journeymen's Club and the Workers' Sports Club, both of which practiced the same sports without competing against each other once every ten years, was indicative of this. Around 1930 there were several big fires in the village, caused by an arsonist who was never identified. In 1923 the new school building, now the kindergarten, was inaugurated.

By 1933, the Nazis under Hitler were gaining more and more supporters for their NSDAP in Amendingen. However, with about 20% of the votes, the interest remained relatively low. The reason for this was the Catholic attitude of the majority of the inhabitants and the left-wing workers' parties. It was not until Hitler came to power that a local NSDAP group was formed. At the same time, the old city council and Mayor Dirr were to be dismissed and replaced by party members or supporters. The local NSDAP chairman Göppel was to take over the office of mayor on behalf of the district leadership. Due to Dirr's 30 years of service as mayor and the trust the citizens of Amendingen had in him, Göppel realized that Dirr was the more suitable candidate and therefore asked him to remain in office. However, Dirr had to join the party. Göppel himself became deputy mayor. The local group took on the task of organizing festivities such as May Day, Thanksgiving, and others, as well as promoting sports and Nazi institutions. By the beginning of the war, the number of party members had risen from 10 to 80.

=== Amendingen during the Second World War ===
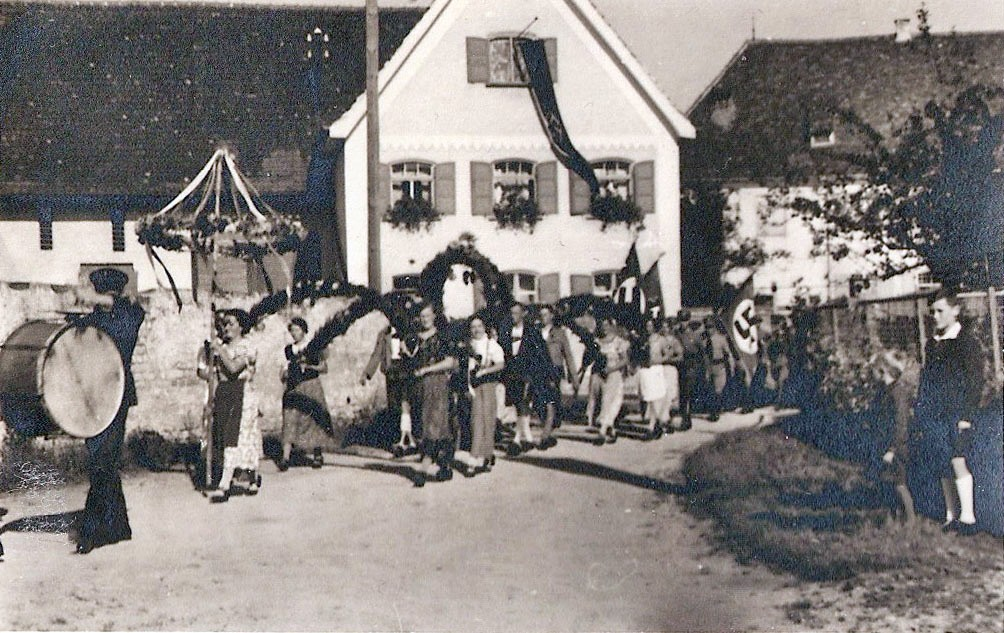
May Day celebration in Amendingen under the swastika

Soldiers from Amendingen were already involved in the invasion of Poland. This was the first casualty of the war. During the Balkan campaign in April 1941, many soldiers from Amendingen were deployed with the mountain troops. Soldiers from Amendingen also fought in the cauldron of Stalingrad.

From the beginning of 1943, Amendingen was threatened by Allied air raids because of the nearby Memmingerberg airbase. In the same year, about 50 refugees, mostly women and children, arrived from the almost destroyed city of Essen. They were soon joined by about ten Silesian families.

By March 1945, there were about 4,000 wounded soldiers in the military hospitals of Memmingen. The mayor of Memmingen tried to persuade the local doctor to declare Memmingen a military hospital town, i.e. an open town, given the large number of wounded, and thus to surrender without a fight. This would have meant that Amendingen would not have been defended either. The doctor, however, refused, saying that he was too much of a soldier and had a duty to defend even the last pile of sand.

The flow of refugees from the West via Egelsee and Ulm continued to increase. In mid-April, the German army began to retreat from the west. The column moved past Amendingen through the town of Memmingen. The Vlasov armymade up of Soviet prisoners of war and "willing helpers" recruited by Heinrich Himmler and stationed at the Heuberg camp on the Swabian Alps, passed through Amendingen on its retreat. Most of the estimated 10,000 men went to the nearby municipal forest to bivouac. A few hundred stayed in the village and spent the night. They broke into various houses and looted them. They soon moved east.

During heavy air raids on the Memmingerberg airbase and railroad facilities in Memmingen on April 20, 1945, about 30 bombs fell on the Amendingen area. Except for the railroad tracks near today's sports field, there was no significant damage.

On April 26, 1945, around six o'clock in the morning, the first artillery fire was heard. Heimertingen, seven kilometers away, had already been captured and badly damaged. After the American troops had issued an ultimatum for the surrender of Memmingen on the same day, it was decided to surrender the town and the surrounding villages without a fight - also because of the many wounded in the military hospitals. On the orders of the local NSDAP group leader, the local peasant leader went to the city hall in Memmingen later that day to present a declaration of solidarity for the community of Amendingen and the city of Memmingen to surrender without a fight.

In the early afternoon, Mayor Dirr and local group leader Göppel surrendered the village without a fight. Dirr also declared that Amendingen was free of German soldiers and that there would be no shooting. A group of French POWs soon became the spokesmen for the people of Amendingen. Most of them had worked for the farmers in the village for two years or more, and they told the Americans that they had been treated well by the farmers and the rest of the population.

During the capture of the city, there was an incident in the old mill in the so-called New World. There was one fatality when the owner of the mayor's office, located in the Villa Stetter, was unable to open the locked door in time and was hit by shots fired by an American soldier to blow up the castle. Otherwise, the American invasion went off without a hitch. The tanks moved on to occupy the town of Memmingen. The last of the 100 Amendingen prisoners of war did not return until five years later. Of the 350 men called to arms, 64 were killed and 35 were missing.

=== Postwar period to the present day ===
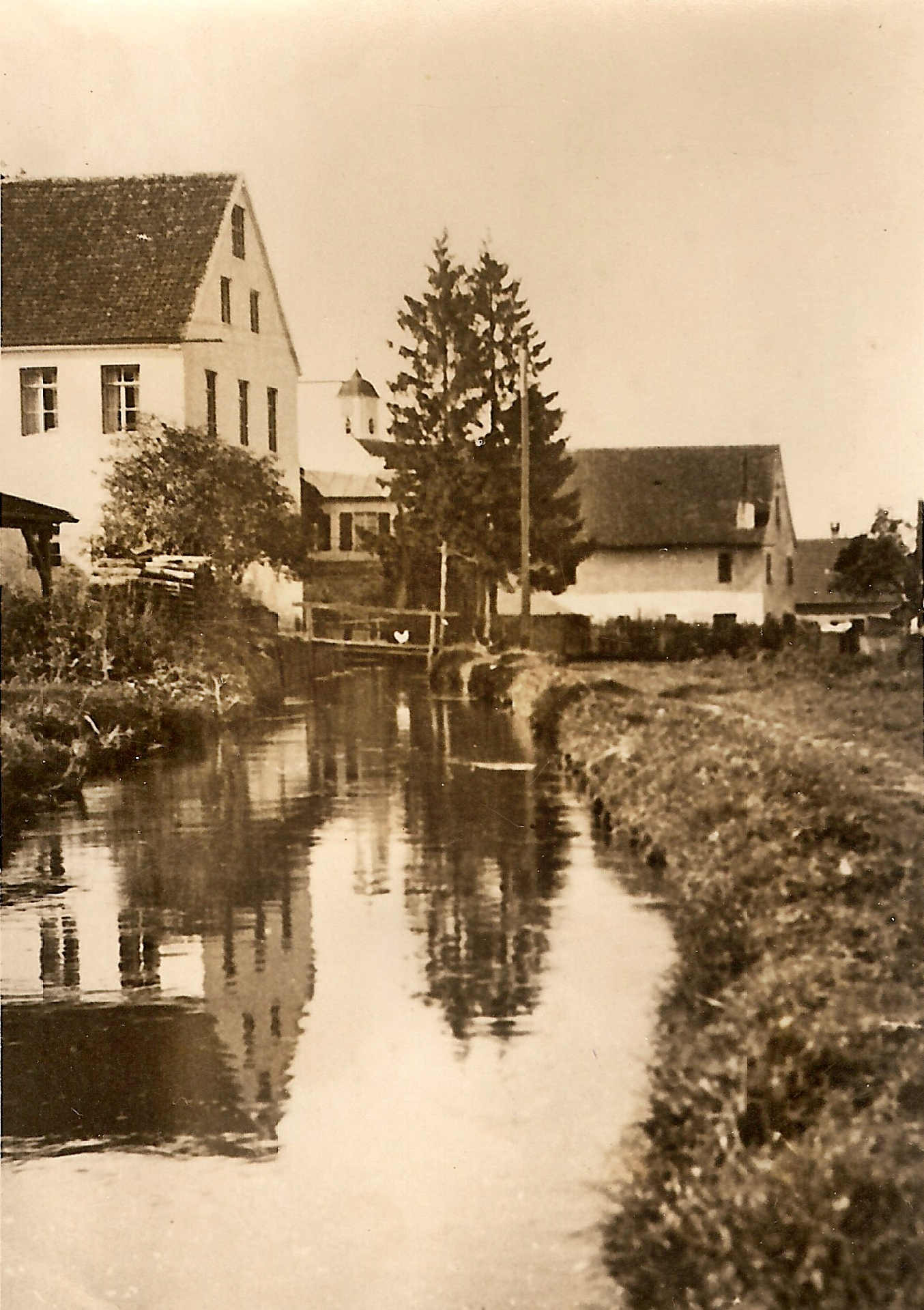
Old stream past the Schlössle

The Americans remained in the village for about 14 days until the German surrender. A small staff was left in the village to maintain peace and order and to enforce the interests of the American military government. The large number of forced laborers, who were free to move about, looted the countryside for several days. The Americans had allowed them to do so, so no one could resist. There were reports of mass thefts and fires in all the surrounding villages. But thanks to the testimony of French prisoners of war, nothing happened in Amendingen, with a few exceptions.

After 41 years of uninterrupted service, Mayor Johann Dirr was removed from office by the Americans because of his party affiliation. Six months later he died of a stroke. Josef Höfelmayer, a mill and sawmill owner, was appointed by the occupying forces as his temporary successor. In February 1946, the first free municipal elections were held and Josef Riedmiller, a farmer, was elected mayor of Amendingen.

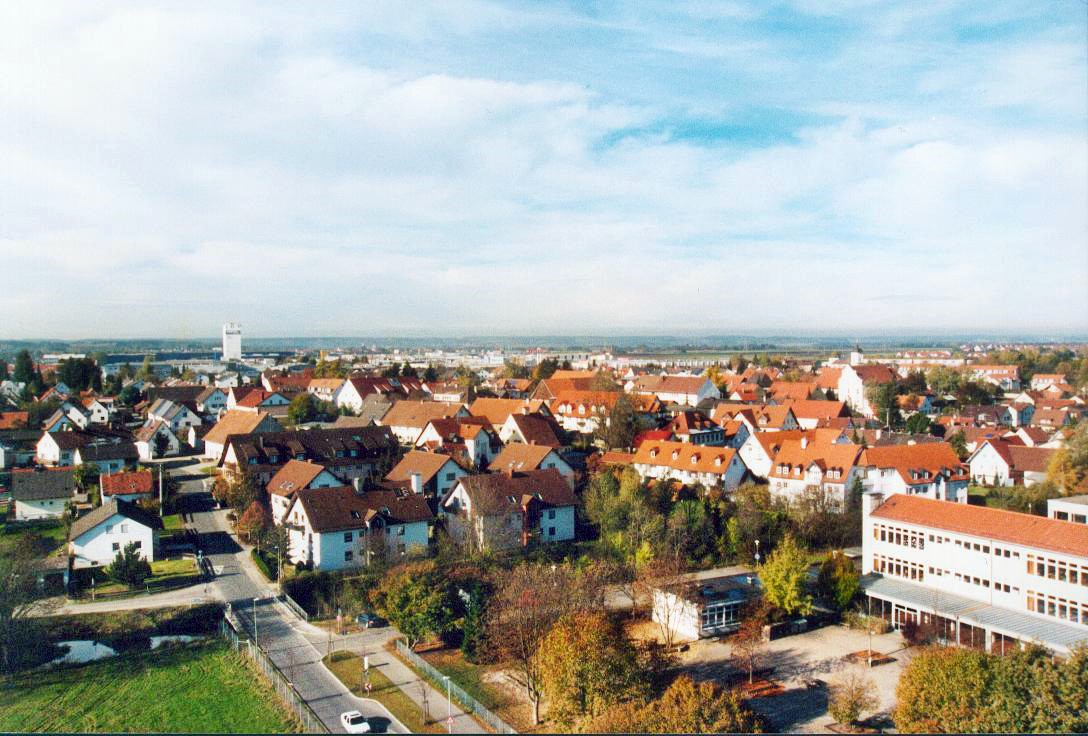
Photo from the eastern edge of the village

290 refugees and displaced persons came to Amendingen from the former German territories in the East, especially from the area of Jägerndorf (Krnov) in the Sudetenland. This was a great burden for the community of 900 inhabitants.

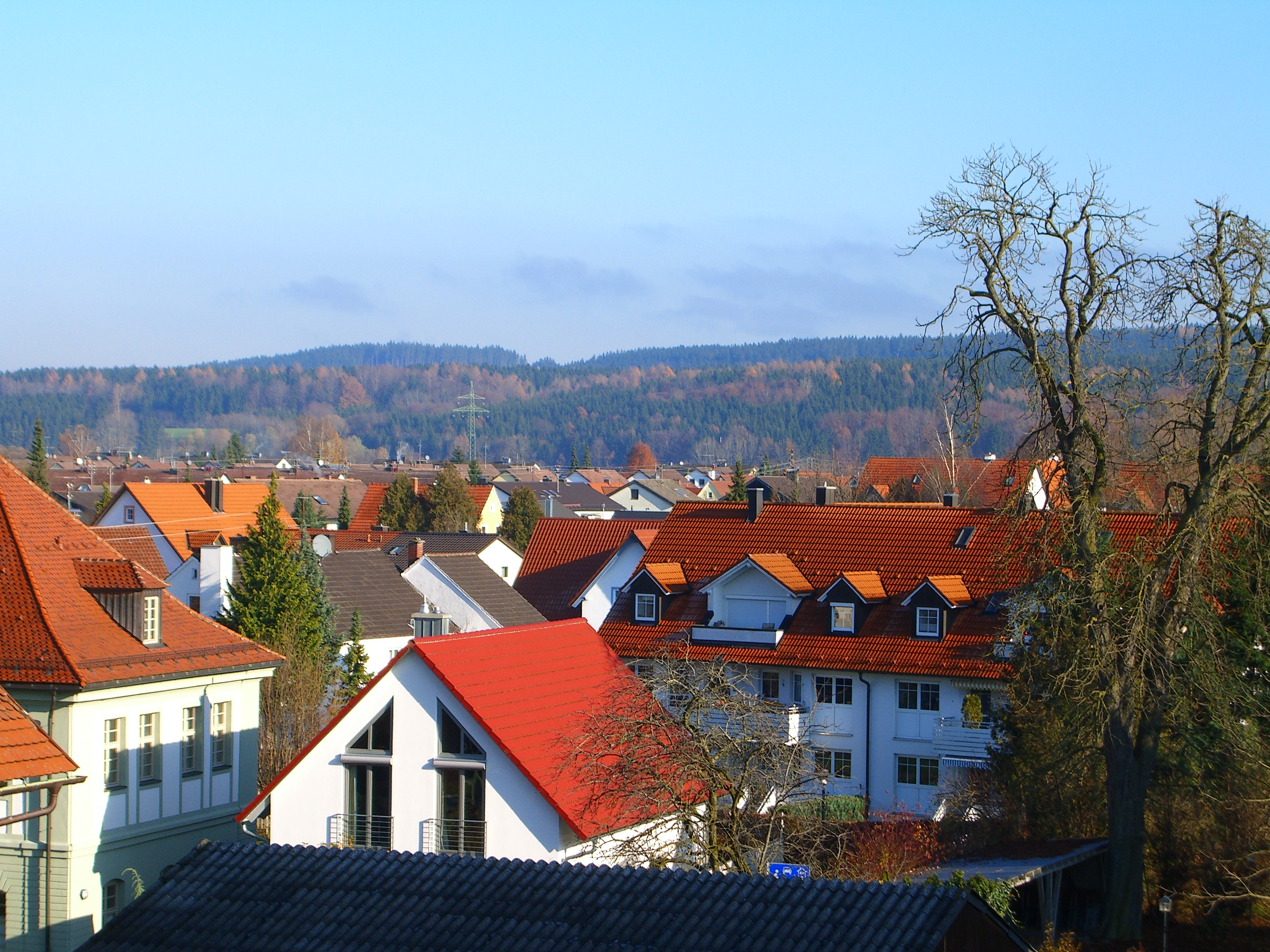
View towards the northeastern lower village

In 1949 and 1950, the last prisoners of war from Russia and other eastern countries returned home. The housing shortage was still great. In the following years, several social housing projects were built, such as a six-family house on the outskirts of the village in 1950 and ten single-family houses on Stoll-Wespach-Strasse in 1952. During the land consolidation in the winter of 1953/54, the regulation of the Memminger Ach was begun. The previously artificial riverbed was filled in and the Ach was returned to its almost natural course. The community, together with the district, had to invest a lot of money to attract new industries and create jobs. In the end, the Metzeler foam rubber factory and the Cord Ltd. carpet factory settled here and built a large factory.

The company preferred to hire workers from Amendingen, which helped reduce the high unemployment rate. The temporary municipal offices in the school had become too small. The council bought a farm. A community center was built on the farmer's land at today's Ulrichsplatz. The new building also housed the post office and the volunteer fire department. In 1956, Mayor Riedmiller did not run in the local elections for health reasons. Henning von Rom was elected as his successor.

Amendingen's favorable geographic location was a major attraction. Construction activity for industry and commerce, as well as private housing, increased rapidly, resulting in a rapid rise in tax revenues. Social housing was built for refugee families, alleviating the severe housing shortage.

The entire road network was constructed in four phases between 1959 and 1963. In addition to the basic widening of the streets, the installation of curbs and the provision of drainage, the streets were given a new asphalt surface. In October 1964, construction began on a new school, which opened on July 16, 1966. The old school became a kindergarten.

On July 1, 1972, Amendingen was incorporated into the city of Memmingen as part of the regional reform. This ended the short period of independence of the town. Today the town hall is used by the city of Memmingen and the volunteer fire brigade of Amendingen. In the 1970s, the B18 was extended to the A96 at the southern edge of the village. This road still runs through the middle of the village and separates the old town from the new settlements, such as the Römerhof settlement, named after the remains of a villa rustica found there.

Over the years, differences arose between the people of Amendingen and Memmingen, mainly due to the delayed construction of a new mortuary at the cemetery and the drastically deteriorating situation at the Amendingen elementary school. More and more students were being taught in cramped conditions. It was not until 1986, after much discussion, that the expansion of the Amendingen school was undertaken. From June 21 to 23, 1985, the new sports field and the sports house of SV Amendingen were inaugurated. In the same year, on September 27, the music room, which had been added to the kindergarten, was inaugurated.

The Amendingen Fountain Festival has been held annually since the inauguration of the fountain in front of the former town hall on June 2, 1991. The northern industrial area, most of which is located in Amendingen, has continued to develop. Today it is the second largest contiguous industrial area in Swabia.

Due to the lack of space, the risk of accidents and the lack of various functional rooms, an initial cost estimate was commissioned in 1993 for the extension of the old fire station to include a training room and wet rooms. After the space situation proved to be insufficient, a completely new fire station was planned. However, several years passed before the groundbreaking ceremony in March 2017, and a site on Donaustrasse near the northern industrial area was chosen as the new location. The new fire station cost just under 4 million euros. With a floor space of 1,100 square meters, the vehicle hall offers space for up to six fire engines, as well as workshop and storage areas and an administrative area with several training and function rooms. The new fire station will be officially opened on April 13, 2019.

=== Coat of arms ===
blazon1	Split; in front in green a silver horseshoe nailed in black, behind in gold a black Double Cross. At the request of the municipality, a municipal coat of arms was approved by the state government in 1962. The horseshoe refers to the former lordship Eisenburg, in whose possession the political municipality used to be, the paw cross is the coat of arms of the Memmingen crusaders, who had larger possessions in the village at that time. The field colors green and gold are a reminder that the right of patronage over the Amendingen church had belonged to the Charterhouse of Buxheim since 1642; the Buxheim coat of arms is quartered gold-green, which can be traced back to the Herren von Ellerbach, as founders of the Charterhouse.

=== Religions ===
Due to its historical development, the parish is predominantly Catholic. The baroque church of St. Ulrich forms the center. Later, an influx of new residents led to the formation of a Protestant parish, which has been housed in the Amendingen Schlössle since 1998. Another church belongs to the Priestly Society of St. Pius X.

=== Population development ===
Population development of the village of Amendingen from the 16th century to 2018
Year	Inhabitants
16th century	600*
1600–1650	150*
1650–1700	300*
18th century	600*
19th century	700*
1935	679
1946	1300*
12/1953	1280
12/1964	1650
06/1966	1844
01/2006	3623
12/2006	3699
12/2007	3711
12/2008	3740
12/2009	3739
12/2013	3712
12/2018	3714

* Estimate

== Politics ==
The former municipal council consisted of eight councilors, the mayor, and his deputy. The last mayor was the merchant and owner of Grünenfurt Castle, Henning von Rom. After the local elections in March 2008, there were six councilors and the deputy mayor from Amendingen in the Memmingen city council.

The former community leaders and mayors were:

- ? - 1904: Dirr Sr.
- 1904-1946: Johann Dirr
- 1946-1946: Josef Höfelmayr ( provisional)
- 1946-1956: Josef Riedmiller
- 1956-1972: Henning von Rom

On December 9, 1972, shortly after the incorporation, a citizens' committee was founded on the initiative of the Amendingen citizens Xaver Mang, Heinrich Lacher and Stefan Binzer. The task of the citizens' committee was to monitor the adherence to the written and oral concessions made by the city during the involuntary incorporation into Memmingen in a spirit of objective cooperation. The Citizens' Committee has no rights and can only achieve success through skillful action. It must never give the impression that it wants to build a wall between the city and the district of Amendingen. The committee should support the town councilors responsible for Amendingen to the best of their ability and also work directly with the town. Committee members are elected every three years. All residents of Amendingen over the age of 18 are eligible to vote.

== Culture and attractions ==
=== Historic buildings ===
==== Amendingen Schlössle ====
The Amendingen Schlössle was built around 1730. It was originally a coppersmith and wire drawing shop. A second stream bed was dug for the operation of the forge hammer, which was filled in again in 1960. Later, the Schlössle temporarily housed the post office.

Because it was a listed building, it could not be demolished. As a result, it fell into the hands of several people who let it fall into disrepair due to the high cost of renovation. In 1995, the Protestant Church took over the building and renovated it. In 1998 it was inaugurated as the Protestant Parish Hall.

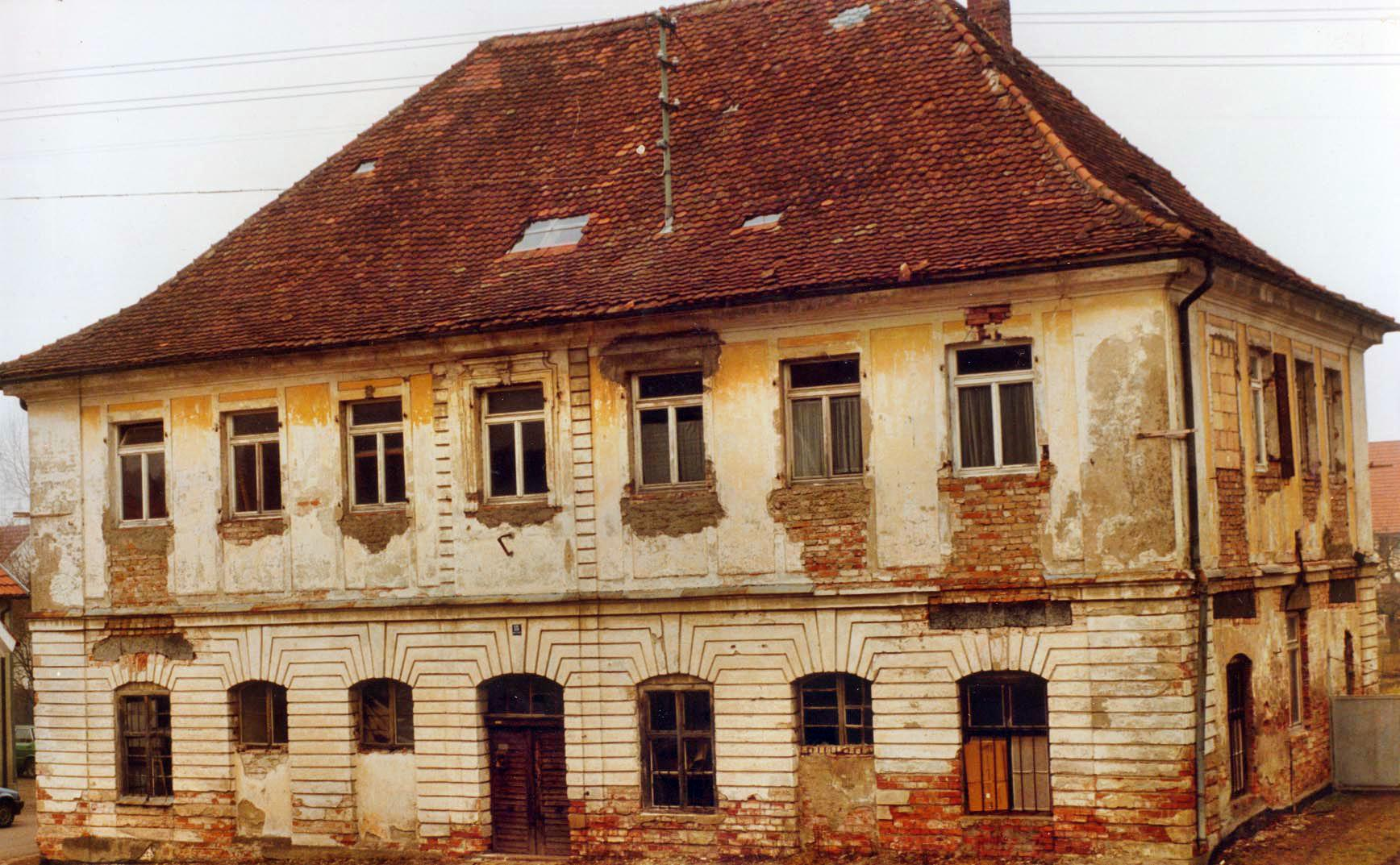
The Schlössle before...

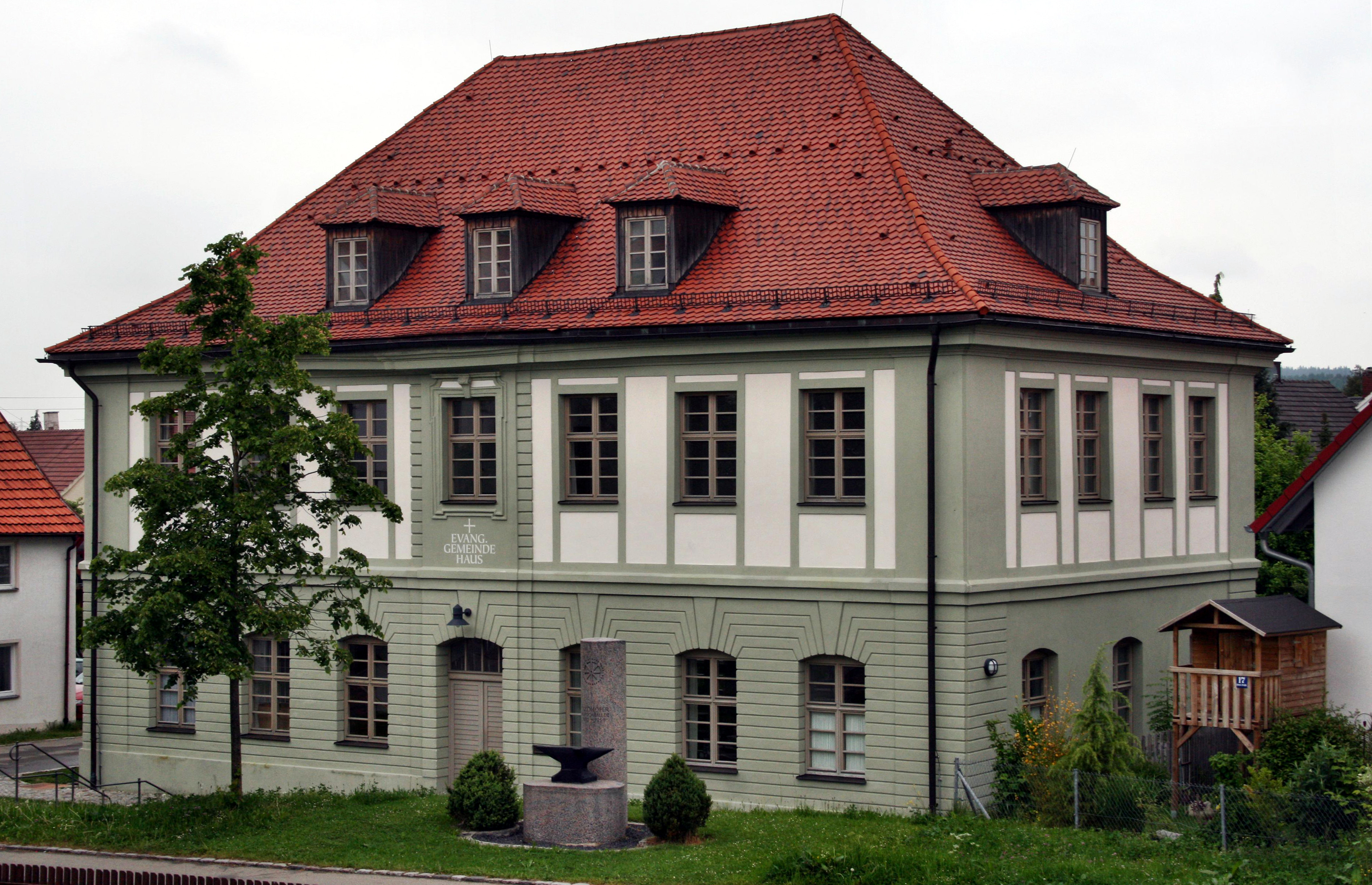
...and after the renovation

==== Church of St. Ulrich ====
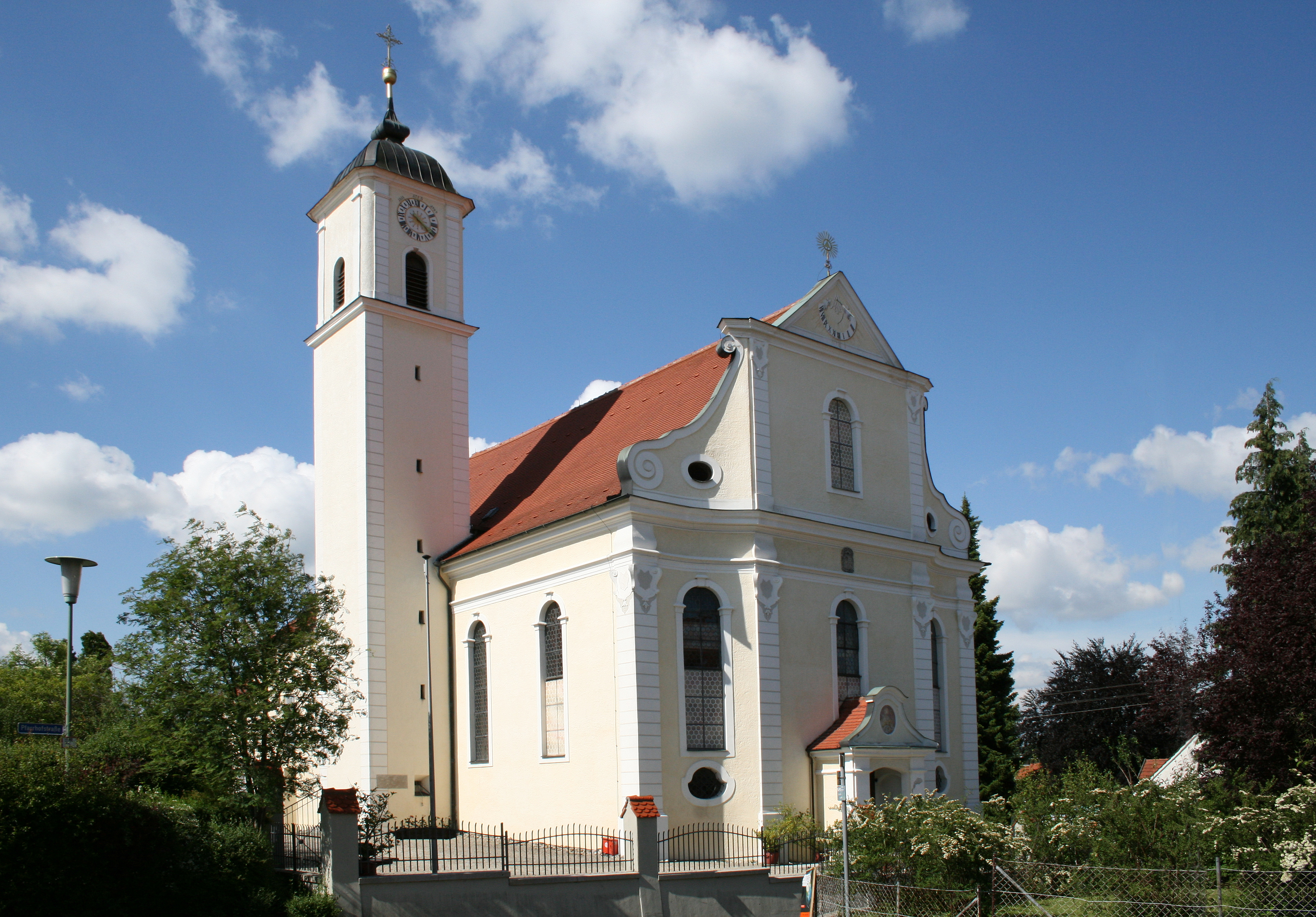
The church of St. Ulrich

The Roman Catholic parish church of St. Ulrich was built between 1752 and 1755 in the Baroque and Rococo styles. The patron saint's day is celebrated on the 4th of July (Ulrich of Augsburg). The most important works of art in the church are a Madonna by Ivo Strigel and a statue of St. Ottilie (around 1500).

==== War memorial ====
The war memorial with St. George on horseback on a large pedestal, a work of the sculptor Daumiller from Memmingen, was erected in 1923 by the Veterans' Association on the St. Ulrich square. Most of the costs were covered by the municipality, the rest by donations within the association.

==== Hammer mill ====
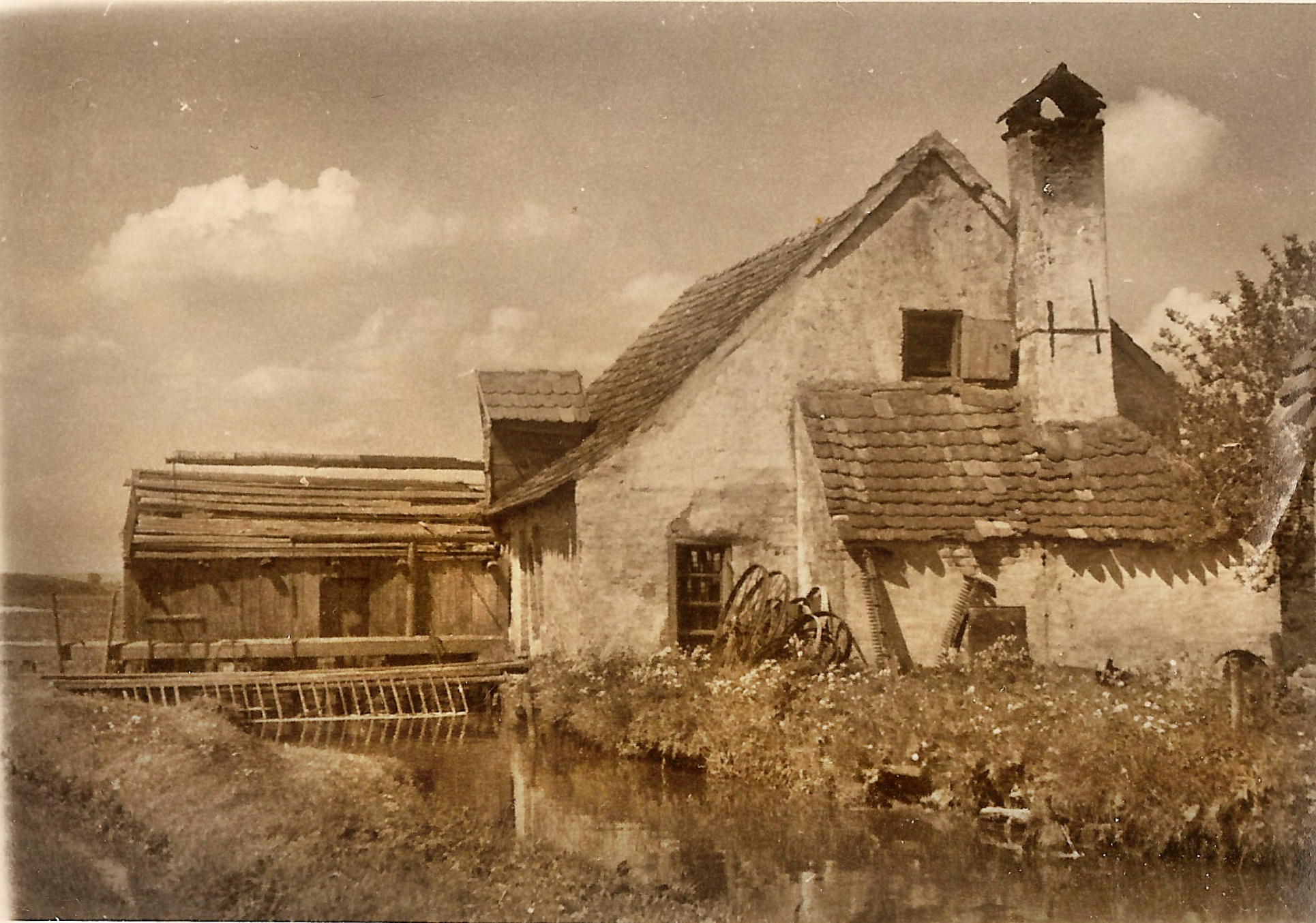
The former hammer mill

The first hammer mill's forge with hammer, bollier and grinder stood at Haienbach bey der segmül. It was first mentioned in 1465 when it was awarded to a Blattner (hammersmith). It was probably moved to the northern end of the village soon afterward. For a very long time, it was owned by Memmingen's Unterhospital as a copper hammer, just like the Schlössle. In the 1930s, the hammers and the waterworks were removed after mainly only bell swings had been forged there. The forge was used until the 1950s. Despite its worthy character, it was demolished in 1975 to make way for residential development. The street name At the hammer mill still commemorates the location.

==== Tavern ====
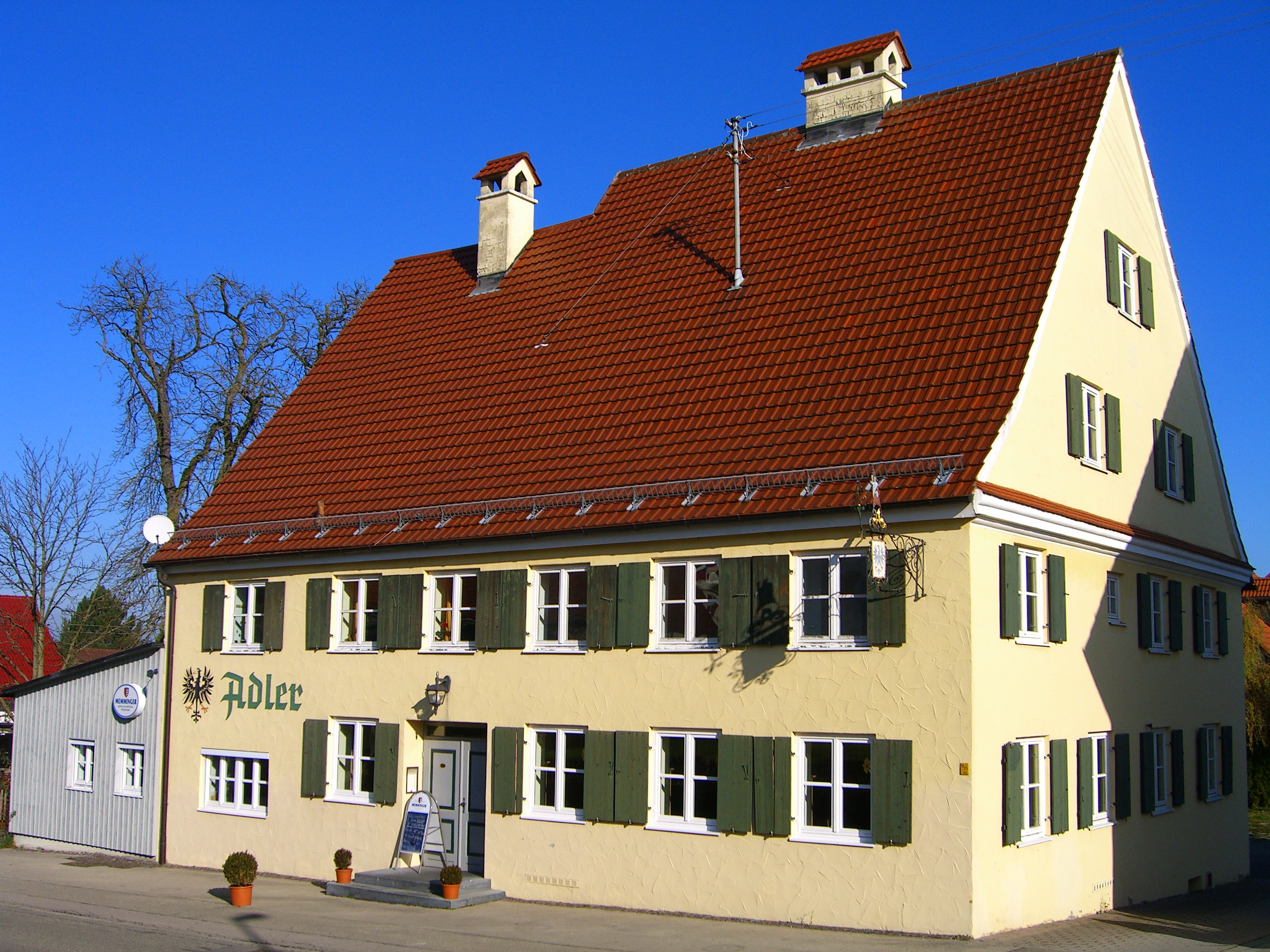
The tavern, today the Gastwirtschaft zum Adler inn

The tavern, now the Gastwirtschaft zum Adler, a simple saddle-roofed house with a wrought-iron cantilever with stylized vines and flowers from the second half of the 18th century, was both an inn and a manor brewery, which had to supply the lordship of Eisenburg and the surrounding villages with beer. The inn was first mentioned in 1475 when the Sättelin family divided the estate. The first innkeeper was mentioned in 1551. The building belongs to the Memmingen brewery and is still an inn.

==== Associations ====
The oldest organization in the village is the Amendingen Volunteer Fire Department. It is the second largest fire department in the Memmingen area. After the big fire in Amendingen in 1866, there were already efforts to establish a volunteer fire department. However, it was not founded until twenty-one years later, on June 15, 1887. The largest fire in the history of the fire department occurred in 1977 at the Metzeler production facility. The fire lasted four days and proved so difficult to control that professional fire departments from Munich and Augsburg, as well as a foam fire truck from the Frankfurt airport fire department, had to be called in. However, the fire brigade was not only an association, but also a municipal institution. This dual nature has only been legally clarified since the publication of the Bavarian Fire Brigade Act (BayFwG) in 1985, according to which the fire buff is a municipal institution, but the fire buff association exists alongside it.

The fire department's fire engine currently consists of the following vehicles:

- Tank fire-fighting vehicle 16/25 (Florian Amendingen 21–1)
- LF8-TS fire-fighting vehicle (Florian Amendingen 48–1)
- Crew transport vehicle (Florian Amendingen 14–1)
- P250 powder extinguishing trailer (usually towed by the LF8-TS fire-fighting vehicle, was decommissioned in 2014)
- Oil damage trailer (usually towed by the crew transport vehicle)

Together with the LF 16-TS of the Steinheim fire brigade, the vehicles form the third fire brigade of the city of Memmingen. They are the first responders for incidents in the northern industrial area and at the Memmingen autobahn intersection. The vehicles and the clubhouse were housed in the old city hall until April 13, 2019. Since then, the Amendingen Volunteer Fire Department has been housed in the new fire station at Donaustrasse 111. There are currently about 45 active firefighters. The fire brigade also has about 40 passive or supporting members. The junior fire brigade prepares 14 young people for the fire brigade. The service area of the fire brigade also includes the northern industrial area with more than 100 companies.

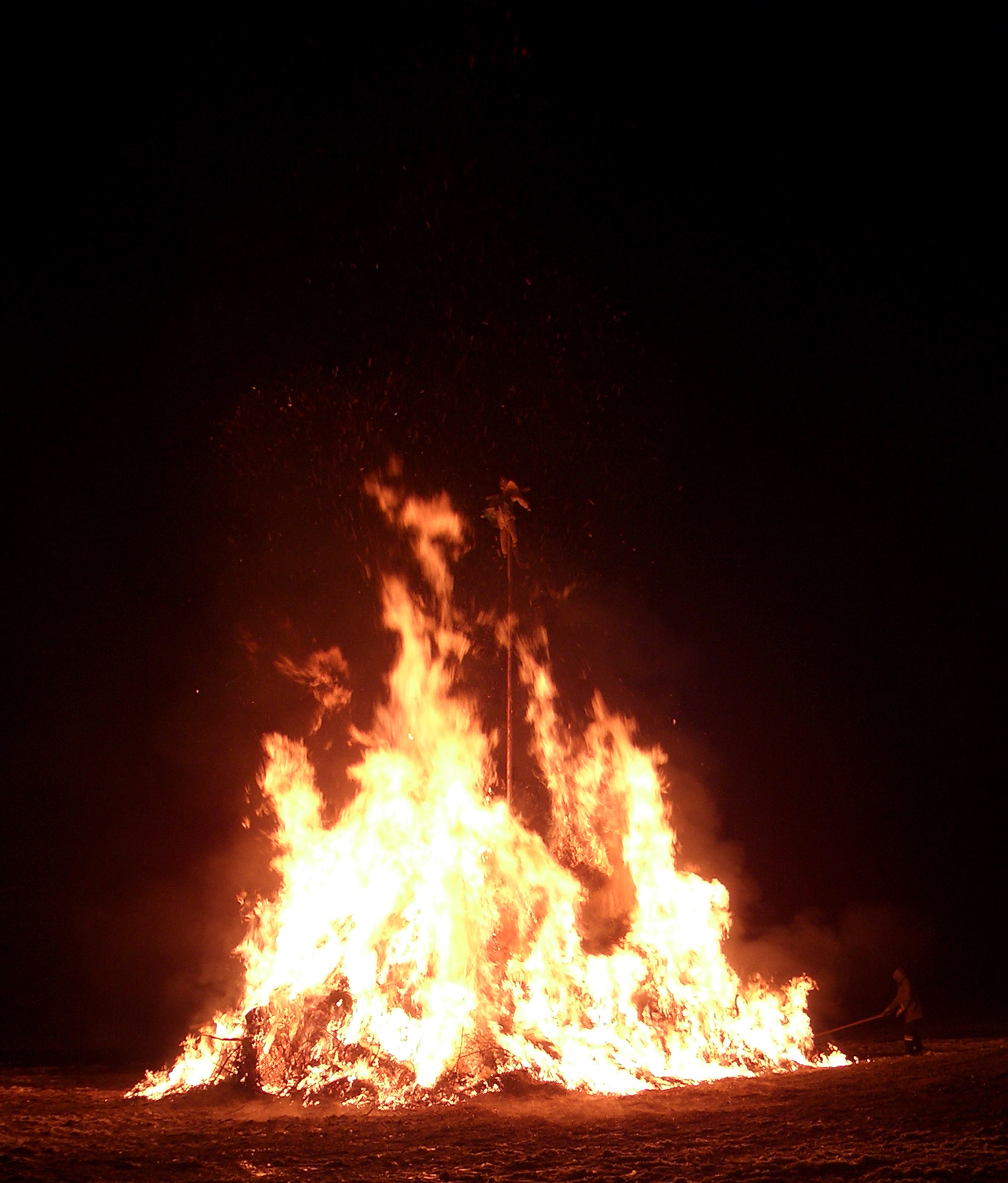
Bonfire 2009

The second oldest club is the Amendingen Sports Association. It was founded in 1923 as a gymnastics club. After being disbanded during the war, the club was re-established in 1946. The club offers a wide range of sports. The SVA women's fistball team currently plays in the second national league.

The Amendingen Music Association was founded on October 1, 1954. It provides the musical framework for various festivals, participates in competitions and takes care of other musical activities. A drama club, a snuff club and smaller music groups have also been formed. The ABS youth band was founded in 2000 with the neighboring bands from Steinheim and Buxheim. The young musicians of the band from Memmingerberg joined later. In 2002, the board of directors decided to establish the Amendingen Youth Music Association to further promote young musicians. Through early musical education, even the youngest children are introduced to instruments. The association is a member of the Allgäu-Swabian Music Association. It currently (2008) has 43 active members and is supported by 202 passive members.

=== Regular events ===
Since the inauguration of the fountain in front of the former City Hall on June 2, 1991, the Fountain Festival has been held there every year. The festival is organized alternately by the Fire Department and the Music Association. On the Sunday after St. Ulrich's Day (July 4), the parish fair is held in and in front of the parish hall and church. The traditional wine festival is usually held on the last weekend in September in the Amendingen school gymnasium. On Bonfire Sunday, the first Sunday after Ash Wednesday, a bonfire is usually lit on the Amendingen field in the direction of Grünenfurt.

== Economy and infrastructure ==
=== Economy ===
Amendingen was agricultural for a long time and was characterized by farms. The oldest company in the village is the special vehicle manufacturer Goldhofer. It developed from Amendingen's village smithy, which was located next to today's Protestant parish hall. Most of the northern industrial estate, the second largest contiguous industrial estate in Swabia, is located in Amendingen. Many companies are world market leaders in their sector. There are the forwarding companies Dachser, Gebrüder Weiss, Epple and Honold. Buzil, a globally active company for cleaning agents, is also based in the industrial estate, as is Goldhofer Inc. from Amendingen, the world's leading manufacturer of special transportation vehicles. A large retail park with retailers is also located on the edge of the industrial estate.

=== Traffic ===
The district is connected to the national transportation network via the A 96 highway and the Augsburg-Memmingen federal highway (B 300) and to the public transportation system of Memmingen via two bus lines.

The Illertal Railway passes the eastern end of the town without stopping. The construction of a stop near the city is planned as part of the Danube-Iller Regional S-Bahn.

=== Education ===
The first school building, a small brick building, was located next to today's Sparkasse bank. As the number of students increased, the former one-class school was divided into two levels. The small school with the pupils of the 1st and 2nd grades was temporarily located in the old sacristan's house next to the church. The large school, with students from grades 3 to 7, remained in the old brick building. The first large school in Amendingen was built during the period of inflation. In 1954 a third school hall was added, and a few years later another hall in a barrack-like style.

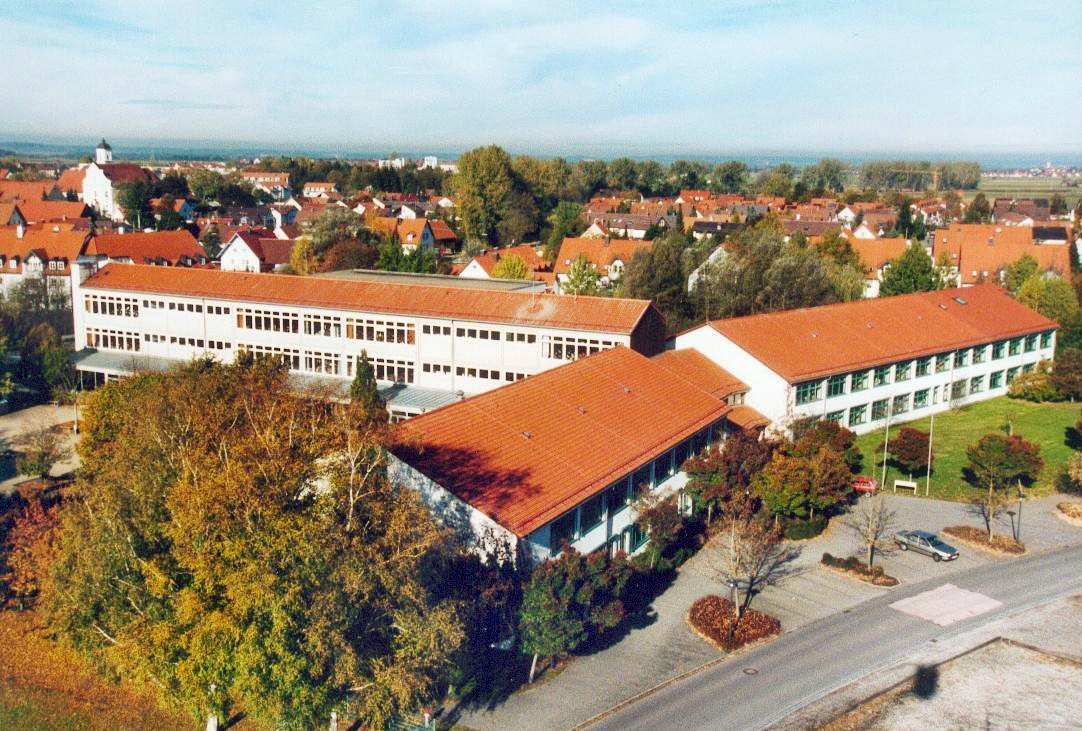
The Amendingen elementary school

After a long search, a plot of land for a new school building was found on the eastern edge of the village. At a cost of approximately two million marks, a school district was created that housed an eight-grade elementary school with a gymnasium. Construction began in October 1964 and the new building was inaugurated on July 16, 1966. Shortly after its completion, however, the school needed to be expanded, as it had become an association school. As a result, enrollment grew rapidly. After frequent and urgent reports of the lack of school space, the expansion of the school was approved in 1985. The school opened at the beginning of the 1987 school year. In 1996, the building was expanded again with the addition of eight more classrooms and subject rooms on the north side of the first expansion. On August 5, 2008, ground was broken for the gymnasium addition.

The school consists of an elementary school and a middle school from grades 1 to 9. There is also a middle school from grade 7 to 10. The current school district includes the primary and secondary schools of the Memmingen districts of Amendingen and Eisenburg as well as the politically independent communities of Buxheim (grades 5–9), Heimertingen, Fellheim and Pleß (grades 7–9). The school currently has 570 students and 49 teachers. In 2011, it will be transformed into a primary and secondary school.

The Amendingen Elementary School became nationally known in 1979 when a teacher slapped a student and the Bavarian Supreme Court, citing common law, tolerated it. This ruling led to a change in the law in Bavaria, which finally abolished corporal punishment.

== Personalities ==
The painter Josef Madlener was born in Amendingen in 1881. A postcard reproduction of his painting The Mountain Spirit served the writer J. R. R. Tolkien as inspiration for the wizard Gandalf in the novel The Lord of the Rings.

Four-time international footballer Franz "Bulle" Roth (* 1946), who played for FC Bayern Munich from 1966 to 1978, is also from Amendingen.

The former Bavarian Minister of Agriculture Josef Miller (* 1947) lives in Amendingen and is a councillor in Memmingen.

== Bibliography ==
- Joachim Jahn et al.: Die Geschichte der Stadt Memmingen – Von den Anfängen bis zum Ende der Reichsstadt. Theiss, Stuttgart 1997, ISBN 3-8062-1315-1.
- Paul Hoser et al.: Die Geschichte der Stadt Memmingen. Vom Neubeginn im Königreich Bayern bis 1945. Theiss, Stuttgart 2001, ISBN 3-8062-1316-X.
- Uli und Walter Braun: Eine Stunde Zeit für Memmingen – vom Umland ganz zu schweigen. Maximilian Dietrich Publisher, Memmingen, ISBN 3-934509-30-4 (various editions).
- Maximilian Dietrich: Der Landkreis Memmingen. German Art Publishers, Memmingen 1971, ISBN 3-87164-059-X.
- Günther Bayer: Memmingen – Alte Ansichten aus Stadt und Land. Publisher Memmingen Newspaper, Memmingen 1990, ISBN 3-9800649-9-9.
- Stefan Binzer: Amendingen in Vergangenheit und Gegenwart – Eine kurzgefasste Ortsgeschichte. Amendingen 1957.
- Stefan Binzer: Amendinger Chronik. History of Amendingen - Over 30 years in war and peace - From the First World War to 1964. 1964.
