= Memminger =

Memminger may refer to:

== Place ==
- Memminger Ach, river in Germany
- Memminger Auditorium, historic building in Charleston, South Carolina

== People ==
- Anton Memminger (1846–1923), German author, publisher, and politician
- Christopher Memminger (1803–1888), German-American politician
- Thomas F. Memminger (1859–1927), American politician
