= Zeller Bach (Memminger Ach) =

River in Germany

- The Zeller Bach in Zell (a part of Bad Grönenbach)

- Mouth of Zeller Bach

Location
- Country: Germany
- State: Bavaria

Physical characteristics
- Mouth
  - location: Memminger Aach
  - coordinates: 47.9709°N 10.1936°E
- Length: 16.8 km (10.4 mi)

Basin features
- Progression: Memminger Aach→ Iller→ Danube→ Black Sea

Zeller Bach is a river of Bavaria, Germany. It flows into the Kressenbach (the upper course of the Memminger Aach) near Memmingen.

== See also ==
- List of rivers of Bavaria
