= Buxach (Iller) =

River in Germany

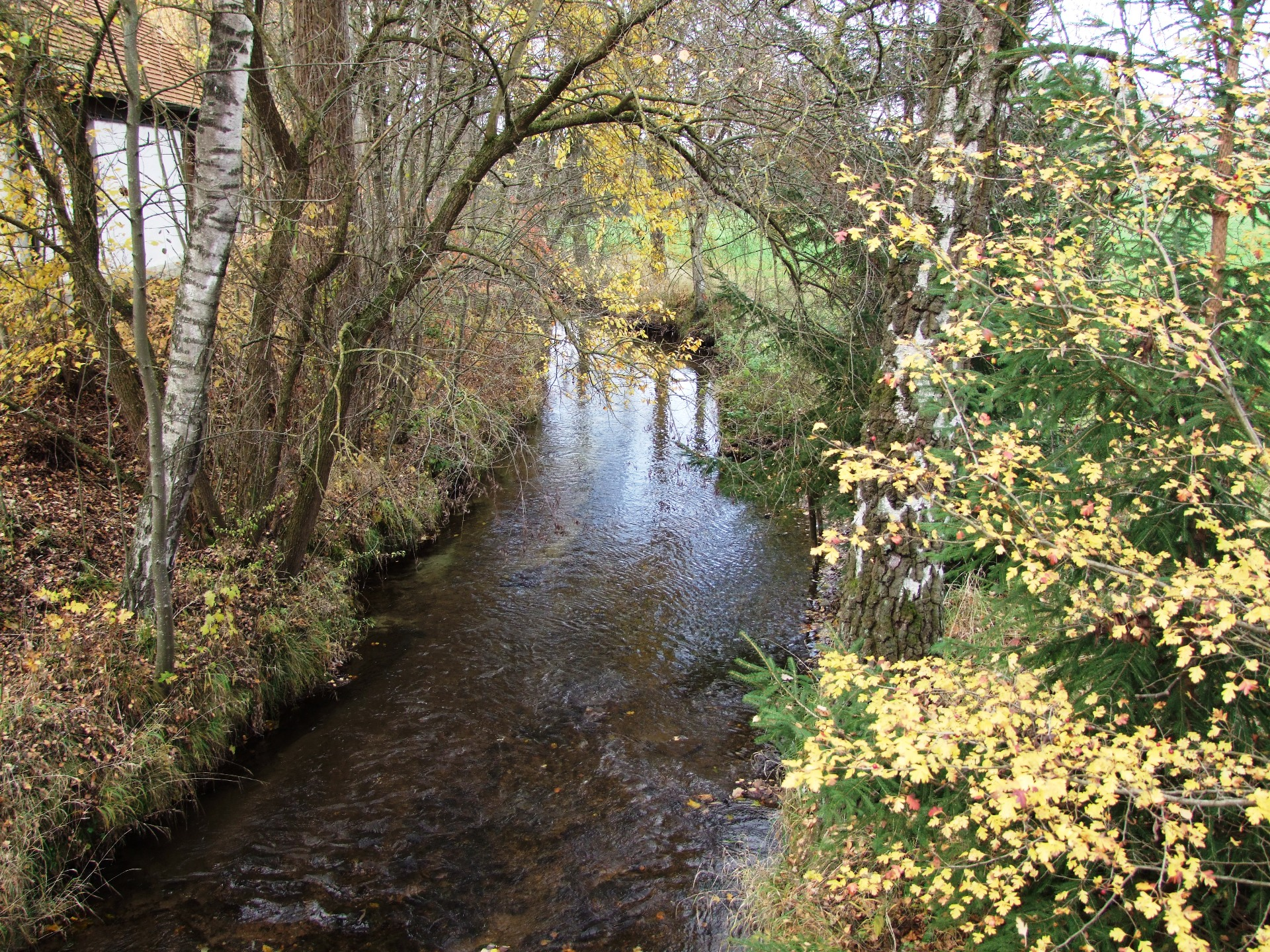
- Buxach in Buxach, Memmingen

Location
- Country: Germany
- State: Bavaria

Physical characteristics
- Source
  - location: at Kronburg
  - elevation: about 700 metres (2,300 ft) above NN
- Mouth
  - location: Iller at Buxheim
  - coordinates: 47.9991°N 10.1222°E
  - elevation: 573 metres (1,880 ft) above NN
- Length: 16.7 km (10.4 mi)

Basin features
- Progression: Iller→ Danube→ Black Sea

Buxach is a river of Bavaria, Germany.

== Overview ==
The Buxbach is a right tributary of the Iller and is about 16.7 kilometres (10.4 mi) long. Its source is southeast of the municipality of Kronburg, near the Einöde Heißenschwende. The Buxach is straightened in only a few places in Hart and Buxach (two districts of Memmingen), but for most of its course, it flows freely. The river banks are surrounded by forests and villages as well as meadows. The Buxach feeds the Buxheimer Weiher, a reservoir north of Buxheim. The water from the Buxheimer Weiher does not flow back into the Buxach, but into the Reutenbach. The Buxach itself flows west from Buxheim on the Illerstadion, where it joins the Iller.

In former times, the Buxach also fed the Memminger municipal pond southward of Hart. The pond was drained around 1900, today still the name of the street "Am Stadtweiher" ("at the municipal pond") is a reminder. Especially in Hart and Buxach, the river was used for industry. In Hart, there was a copper hammer, and several mills and copper hammers existed in Buxach. At the east of Kronburg, an oil mill was operated.

At Buxheim, west of the pond Buxheimer Weiher, the river Reutenbach diverges from the Buxach. Only very little water flows through that direct connection; the Reutenbach is mostly fed by the outflow of the Buxheimer Weiher, which is 200 meters (660 ft) away. The Reutenbach flows northwards through Buxheim and feeds a fish pond near Egelsee (district of Memmingen), then also flows into the river Iller. The mouth of the Reutenbach in the Iller is about 2.3 kilometres (1.4 mi) north from the mouth of the Buxach.

== See also ==
- List of rivers of Bavaria
