= Josef Madlener =

German painter

- Born: 16 April 1881; Memmingen, Kingdom of Bavaria, German Empire
- Died: 27 December 1967 (aged 86); Memmingen
- Known for: Painting, writing
- Notable work: Der Berggeist (1925/30), Gott, Erde und Ewigkeit

Der Berggeist

Josef Madlener (1881–1967) was a Bavarian German artist, illustrator, and writer.

He was born in Amendingen, part of Memmingen, a son of an affluent privatier. and trained as an artist in Munich. His work as an illustrator was published in newspapers, magazines, and Christmas books, such as Das Christkind Kommt (1929) and Das Buch vom Christkind (1938). Madlener's Christmas art also appeared in several postcard series.

The most famous of Madlener's paintings is Der Berggeist ("the mountain spirit", cf. berggeist), from similarities in style dated to the period around 1925–30. The painting is reproduced on a postcard that was in the possession of J. R. R. Tolkien, marked "the origin of Gandalf". Zimmermann (1983:22) interviewed Madlener's daughter Julie (born 1910), who distinctly remembered her father painting Der Berggeist sometime after 1925/6. She also noted that the postcard version was "published in the late twenties by Ackermann Verlag München, in a folder with three or four similar pictures with motifs drawn from German mythology: a fairy lady of the woods, a deer carrying a shining cross between its antlers, 'Rübezahl', and possibly one more". The whereabouts of the original was unknown for some sixty years, until it was auctioned on Sotheby's in July, 2005, and sold for 84,000 GBP.

The previous owner had met Madlener twice and described Madlener as being tall, about 185 cm. He recalled that Madlener liked to bake and, on his second visit in 1946 or 1947 served his own bread and much coffee. Having seen Der Berggeist on his previous visit, the visitor told the artist how much he loved it, and Madlener promptly told his guest to give it a good home.

A monograph by Eduard Raps (1981) published for the artist's centenary, shows many examples of Madlener's art.

== Publications ==
- Das Christkind kommt (1929)
- Das Buch vom Christkind (1938).

== Literature ==
- Eduard Raps Josef Madlener 1881 bis 1967, Memmingen, 1981.
- Manfred Zimmermann, The Origin of Gandalf and Josef Madlener, Mythlore 34, 1983.
- Hans-Wolfgang Bayer and Johannes Hoyer, "Der Nachlaß des Memminger Künstlers Josef Madlener" in: Schönere Heimat 87 (1998), 66–70.
