= Elaine Madlener =

Elaine Madlener (née Wetmore, born 1912) was a manuscript and autograph collector and philanthropist who aided in the development of the National Autograph Collectors Society and the Newberry Library Associates. After graduating from Columbia University, she married Otto Madlener and had two children, Richard and William. Her work as an autograph collector was widely advanced through the Autograph Collectors Society, and she published a paper entitled “Contemporary Authors View the Autograph Collector.” Additionally, she contributed to the Autograph Collectors Journal and the Antiquarian Bookman. Madlener, a New York native, spent most of her life in Chicago, and died in Brunswick, Georgia in 1989.
