= Anton Memminger =

German author, publisher and politician (1846–1923)

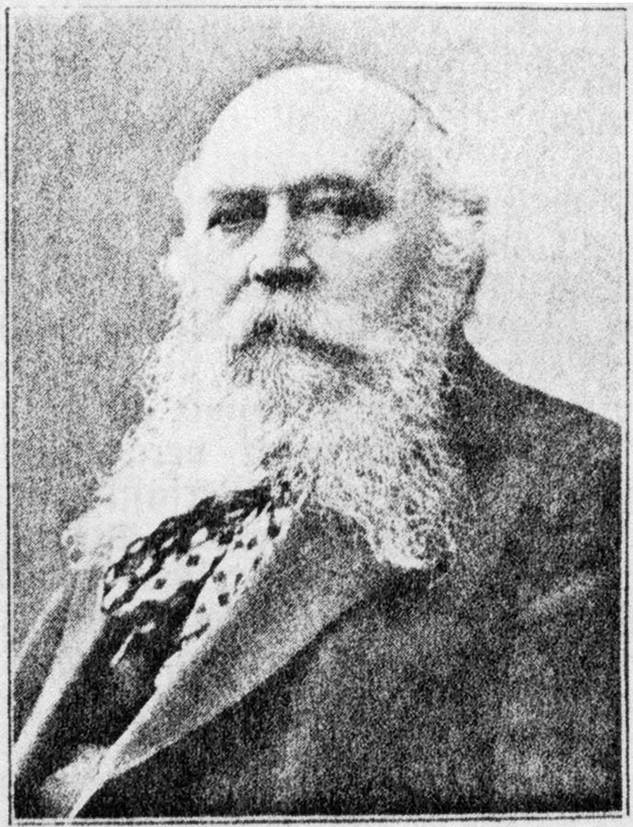
- Anton Memminger, 1905

Personal details
- Born: 2 April 1846 Straubing, Germany
- Died: 30 September 1923 (aged 77) Schonungen, Germany
- Education: University of Würzburg

Anton Memminger (1846–1923) was a German author, publisher and politician. In his Swiss period he used the alias "Oswald Stein".

== Early life ==
Anton Memminger studied at the University of Würzburg jurisprudence, political sciences and history. At this early year he was a member of the Social Democratic Party of Germany. In that period he has contact to Ludwig Feuerbach. After criticizing the king of Bavaria he has to leave the country and went to Switzerland. There he became an expert for railway.

== Years as a publisher ==
In 1883 he was allowed to come back to Würzburg. There he founded the newspaper Neue Bayerische Landeszeitung. Together with his brother Thomas he opened a print shop. This printing house was destroyed during the Bombing of Würzburg in World War II. In this period he also became an antisemitic writer.

== The politician ==
In the year 1903 he became a member of the Landtag of Bavaria. In the years before he was a member of the "Bavarian Bauernbund". The partly antisemitic and agricultural party becomes very successful in that time.

== Works ==
- Die Freimaurer – Die Gefängnisarbeit, Nürnberg 1872. (about freemasons)
- Der Krach – Kritische Gänge durch das schweizerische Eisenbahnwesen, Zürich 1877. (about Swiss railway)
- Herr Alt-Bundespräsident Jakob Stämpfli und die schweizerischen Eisenbahnen – Discurse über die Actiengesellschaften und Staatsbahnen, Zürich 1878. (about Swiss railway)
- Die österreichisch-deutschen Alpenbahnen und das Bodensee-Projekt Bregenz-Friedrichshafen-Constanz, ?. (about Austrian-German railway)
- Die Alpenbahnen und deren Bedeutung für Deutschland und Österreich - Mit bes. Beziehung auf Gotthard, Brenner, Arlberg u. Fernpass, Zürich 1878. (about railway)
- Die N.O.B. [Nordostbahn] im Lichte der Ziffern, ?. (about railway)
- Wer soll bluten?, Würzburg 1885.
- Zürn und Spiess e. Festschr. zur Enthüllung d. Zürndenkmals am 18. Juli 1886, Würzburg 1886.
- Der Talmud, Würzburg 1894 (reprint from the newspaper „Neuen Bayerischen Landeszeitung“, 166 pages).
- (alias Oswald Stein)Vergangenheit, Gegenwart und Zukunft der nationalen Wirthschaftspolitik, Leipzig 1880.
- Lieutenant Hofmeister als Sozial-Demokrat vor dem Militär-Schwurgerichte, Würzburg, 1893.
- Das verhexte Kloster nach den Akten dargestellt, Würzburg 1904 (more editions 1908,1920). (about witch-hunt)
- Schloss Mainberg, Würzburg 1917 (more differing editions 1922, 1934). (castle Mainberg)
- Der Bayernkönig Ludwig II., Würzburg 1918 (more editions 1919, 1920, 1921, 1925, 1933). (king Ludwig II of Bavaria)
- Das Erbe der Druiden – Beiträge zur Geschichte der Geheimbünde, Würzburg 1920 (more editions 1921, 1922, 1926). (about druids)
- Hakenkreuz und Davidstern, Volkstümliche Einführung in die Geheim-Wissenschaften, Würzburg 1922 (more editions).
- Volksmedizin, Die Heilmittel der Druiden nach Marzellus; d. Arzneibuch d. Physikus Johann Seitz, Würzburg 1923 (other editions 1926). (about traditional medicine)
- Schweinfurt ein Führer in die Stadt und Umgebung, Würzburg 1922.
- Neustadt an der Saale, Bad Neuhaus und Salzburg, Würzburg 1921 (other editions 1924).
- Kissingen – Geschichte der Stadt und des Bades, Würzburg 1923 (more differing editions).

== Literature ==
- Abbott, John: Anton Memminger (1846–1923) in: Levy, Richard S., Antisemitism – a historical encyclopedia of prejudice and persecution, Santa Barbara (Calif.) 2005, page 454 f.
- Hochberger, Anton: Der Bayerische Bauernbund 1893-1914 München 1991. (German)
- Memminger, August: Memminger, Anton, Publizist und Politiker. 1846-1923 in: Lebensläufe aus Franken, Bd. 5, Würzburg 1936, page 197-210. (German)
