= Buxheim, Swabia =

Buxheim
- Municipality
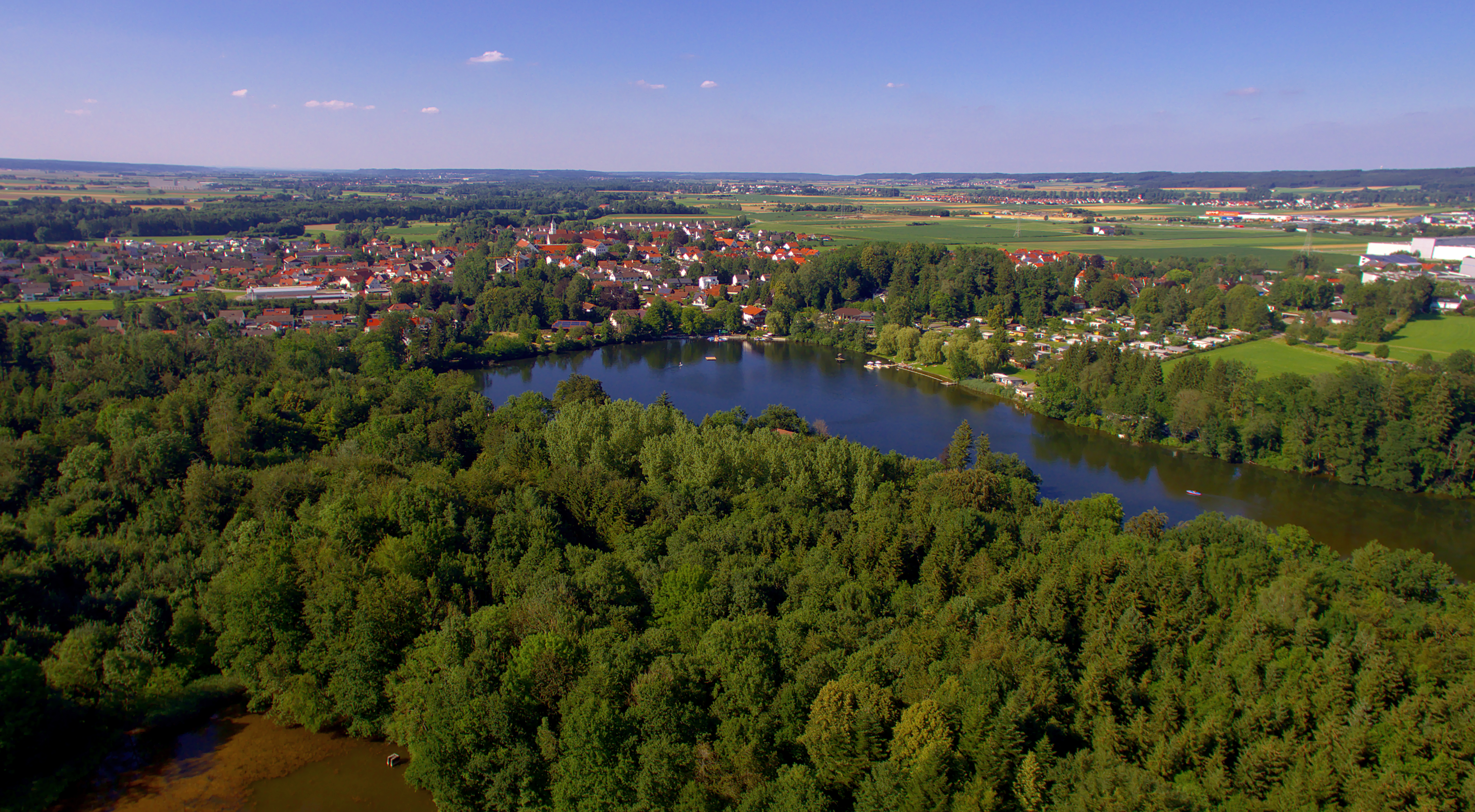
- Buxheim

- Coat of arms

- Location of Buxheim within Unterallgäu district
- Interactive map of Buxheim
- Location within Germany Location within Bavaria
- Coordinates: 48°00′N 10°8′E
- Country: Germany
- State: Bavaria
- Admin. region: Schwaben
- District: Unterallgäu

Government
  - Mayor (2023–29): Wolfgang Schmidt (CSU)

Area
  - Total: 10.23 km^{2} (3.95 sq mi)
- Elevation: 580 m (1,900 ft)

Population (2025-12-31)
  - Total: 3,147
  - Density: 307.6/km^{2} (796.7/sq mi)
- Time zone: UTC+01:00 (CET)
  - Summer (DST): UTC+02:00 (CEST)
- Postal codes: 87740
- Dialling codes: 08331
- Vehicle registration: MN
- Website: www.buxheim.de

Buxheim (German pronunciation: [ˈbʊkshaɪm]) is a municipality in the district of Unterallgäu in Bavaria, Germany.

== Transportation ==
Buxheim is served by the Leutkirch-Memmingen railway.
