= Memminger Ach =

River in Germany

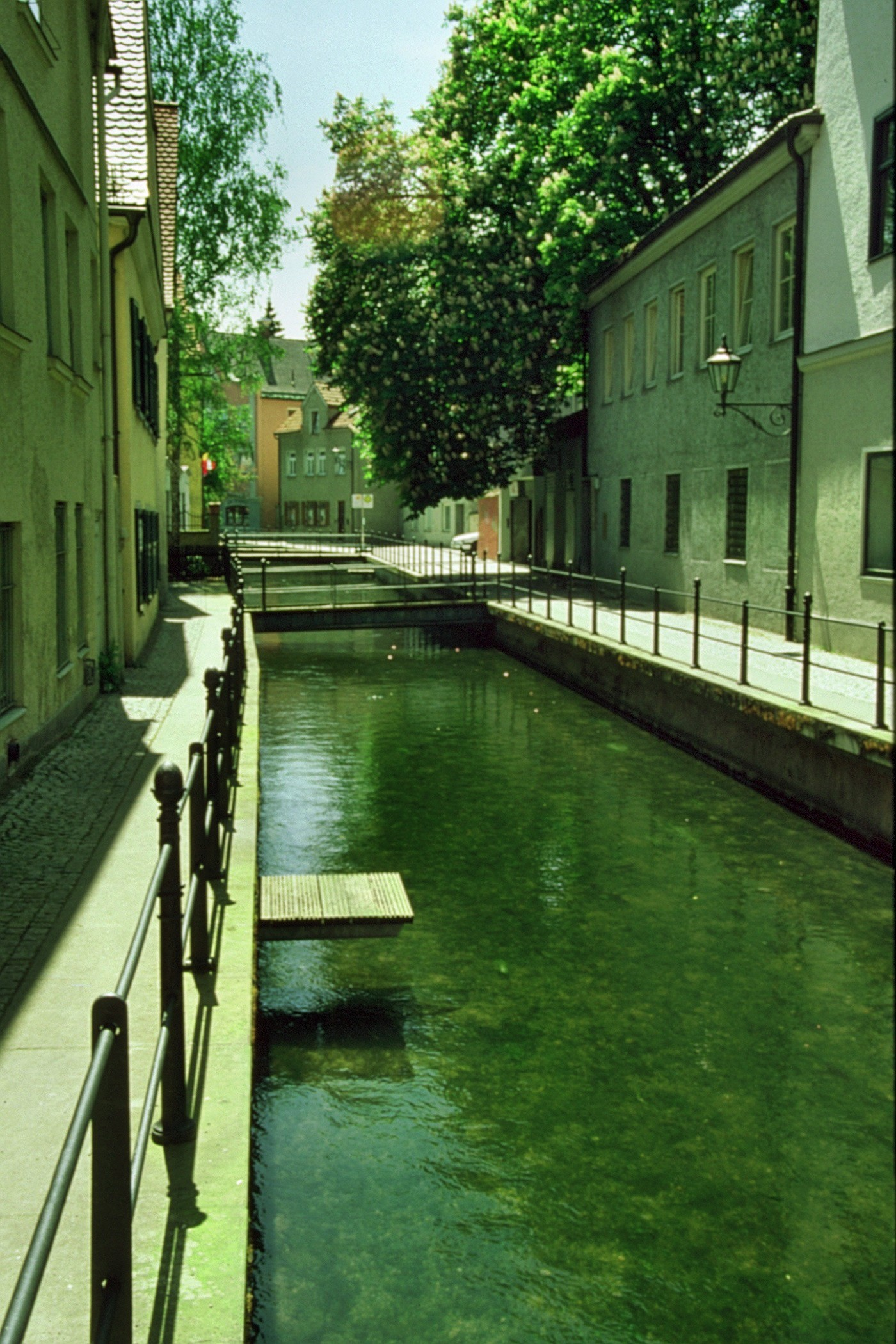
- The Memminger Ach in Memmingen

Location
- Country: Germany
- State: Bavaria

Physical characteristics
- Mouth
  - location: Iller
  - coordinates: 48°06′44″N 10°08′14″E
- Length: 36.0 km (22.4 mi)
- Basin size: 136 km^{2} (53 sq mi)

Basin features
- Progression: Iller→ Danube→ Black Sea

The Memminger Ach (or seldom Memminger Aach) is a river in Bavaria, Germany.

The Memminger Ach is a tributary of the Iller, part of the Danube river system, and forms an important part of the landscape in the town of Memmingen. The river is 19.2 km (11.9 mi) long (36.0 km (22.4 mi) including its source river Kressenbach). It flows into the Iller near Pleß.

== See also ==
- List of rivers of Bavaria
