= Leibi =

River in Germany

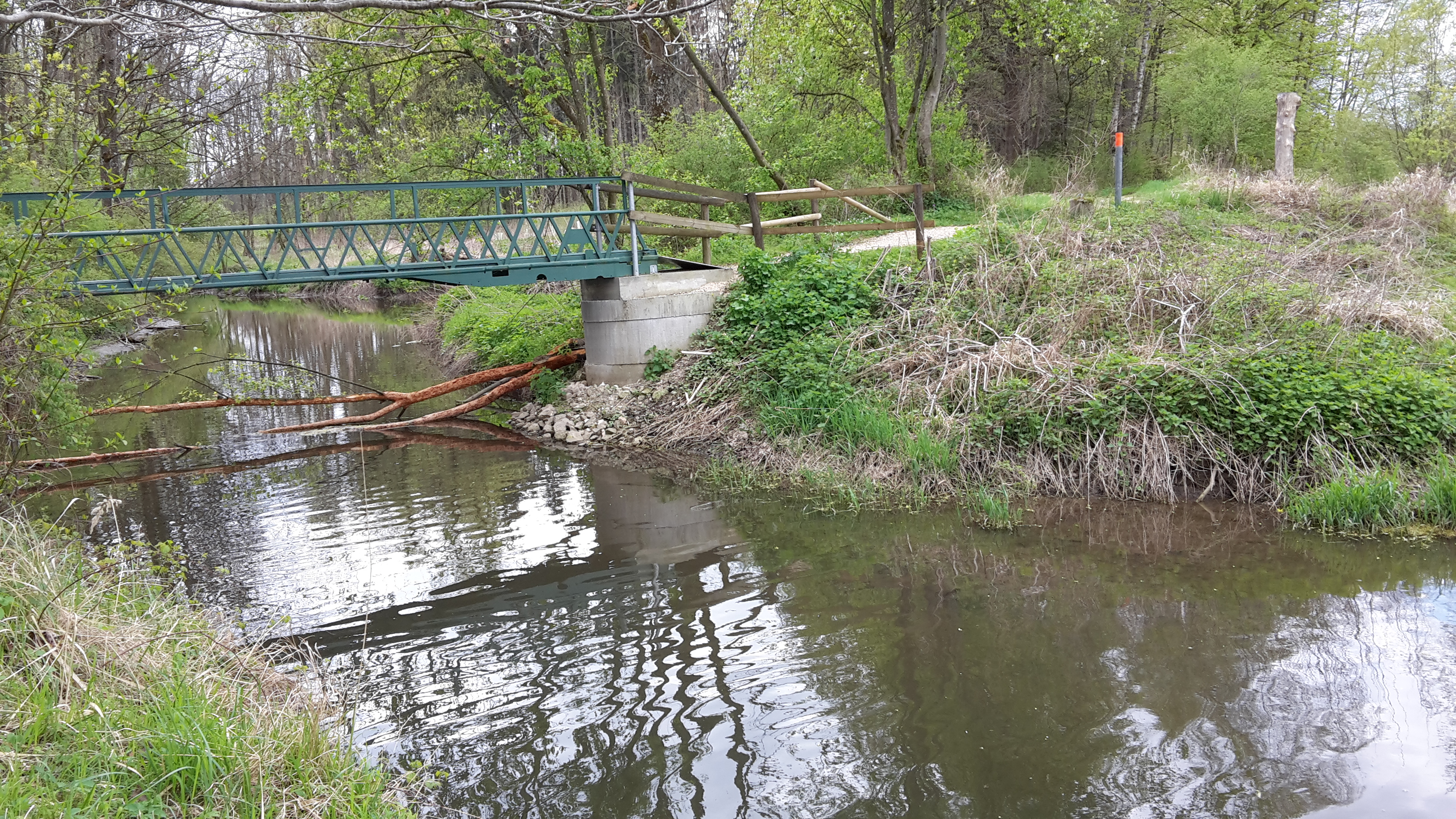
- The mouth of the Leibi

Location
- Country: Germany
- State: Bavaria

Physical characteristics
- Mouth
  - location: Danube
  - coordinates: 48.4422°N 10.1299°E
- Length: 23.1 km (14.4 mi)

Basin features
- Progression: Danube→ Black Sea

The Leibi is a tributary of the Danube in the district of Neu-Ulm, Bavaria, Germany.

The source of the Leibi is in the west of an industrial area in Weißenhorn. The river is 23.1 km long. At first the Leibi crosses the industrial area from South to North and the fields north of it. Then the river briefly turns west along a forest area. After that it flows again to north, past the hamlet Hirbishofen (a part of Pfaffenhofen an der Roth), Holzheim and Steinheim (part of the city of Neu-Ulm). Afterwards the Leibi flows twice under the Bundesautobahn 7 and changes its way to northeast. The river traverses a part of Nersingen also named Leibi and flows finally, after a few hundred meters through the forest Auwald, into the Danube.

== See also ==
- List of rivers of Bavaria
