= Biber (Danube) =

River in Germany

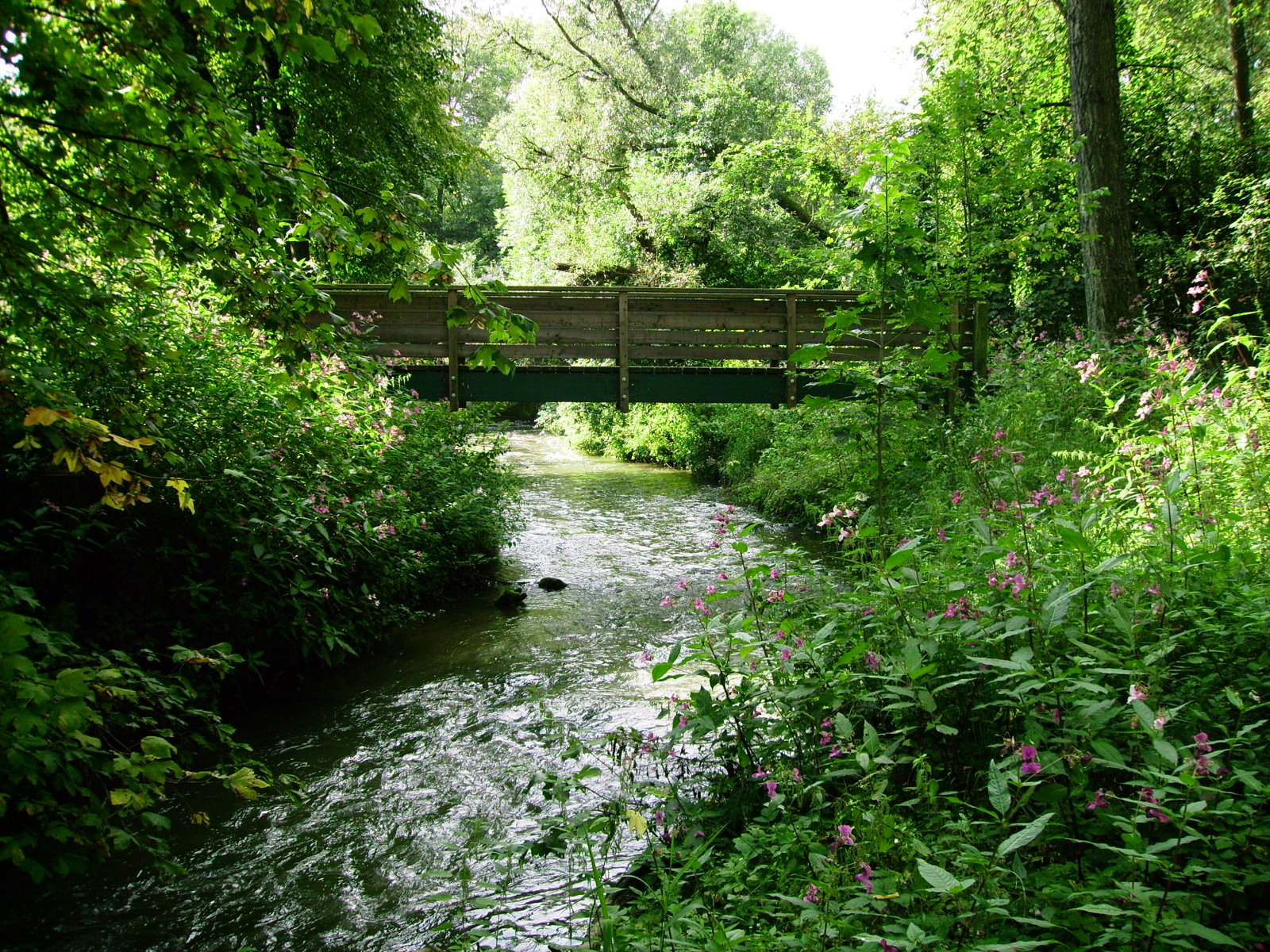
- Biber in the east of Nersingen

Location
- Country: Germany
- State: Bavaria

Physical characteristics
- Mouth
  - location: Danube
  - coordinates: 48.4392°N 10.1811°E
- Length: 37.3 km (23.2 mi)
- Basin size: 114 km^{2} (44 sq mi)

Basin features
- Progression: Danube→ Black Sea

The Biber (German pronunciation: [ˈbiːbɐ]) is a right tributary of the Danube in Bavaria, Germany. The source of the Biber is in the south of the hamlet Matzenhofen in Unterroth. The river is 37.3 kilometres (23.2 mi) long.

First the Biber crosses the forest of Oberroth. Then the river flows west along the monastery of Roggenburg. Afterwards the river flows through several hamlets and the forest Auwald, into the Danube.

== See also ==
- List of rivers of Bavaria
