= Pfaffenhofen an der Roth =

Pfaffenhofen a.d.Roth
- Municipality
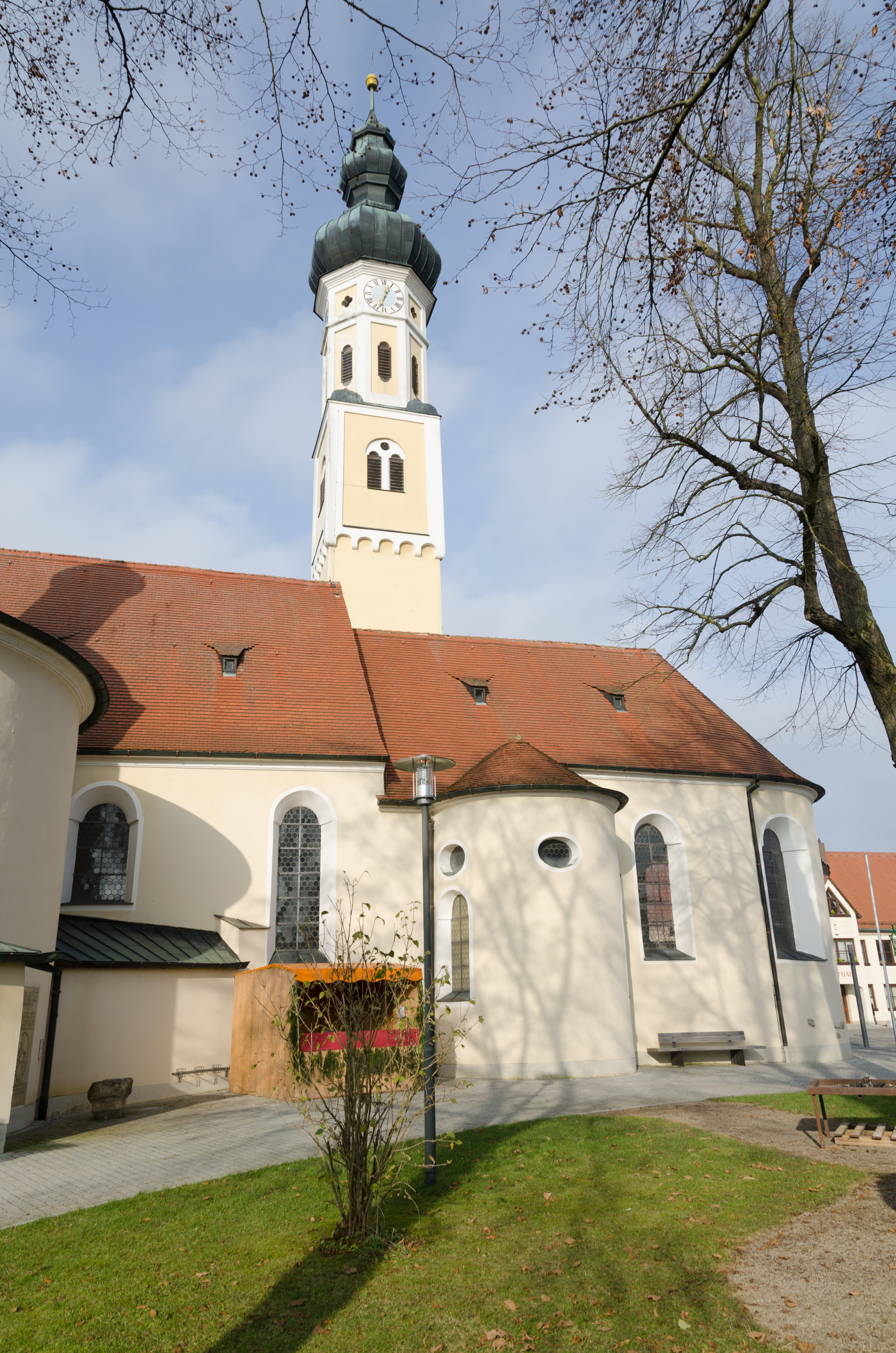
- Church of Saint Martin

- Coat of arms

- Location of Pfaffenhofen a.d.Roth within Neu-Ulm district
- Interactive map of Pfaffenhofen a.d.Roth
- Location within Germany Location within Bavaria
- Coordinates: 48°21′N 10°10′E
- Country: Germany
- State: Bavaria
- Admin. region: Schwaben
- District: Neu-Ulm
- Municipal assoc.: Pfaffenhofen an der Roth
- Subdivisions: 12 Ortsteile

Government
  - Mayor (2020–26): Sebastian Sparwasser

Area
  - Total: 42.68 km^{2} (16.48 sq mi)
- Elevation: 489 m (1,604 ft)

Population (2025-12-31)
  - Total: 7,287
  - Density: 170.7/km^{2} (442.2/sq mi)
- Time zone: UTC+01:00 (CET)
  - Summer (DST): UTC+02:00 (CEST)
- Postal codes: 89284
- Dialling codes: 07302
- Vehicle registration: NU
- Website: www.markt-pfaffenhofen.de

Pfaffenhofen an der Roth (German pronunciation: [pfafn̩ˈhoːfn̩ ʔan deːɐ̯ ˈʁoːt], lit. 'Pfaffenhofen on the Roth') is a municipality and a village in the district of Neu-Ulm in Bavaria in Germany. Its most famous inhabitant was Hermann Köhl, an aviation pioneer of the 1920s.

== Geography ==
The municipality is centered around the village of Pfaffenhofen an der Roth, located on the right bank of the river Roth, approximately 14 km southeast of the cities of Ulm and Neu-Ulm. Several smaller villages and localities are spread across the municipality, including Balmertshofen, Berg, Beuren, Biberberg, Diepertshofen, Erbishofen, Hirbishofen, Kadeltshofen, Luippen, Niederhausen, Raunertshofen, Remmeltshofen, Roth, Volkertshofen. The municipality is bordered by the municipalities of Neu-Ulm and Holzheim to the west, Nersingen to the north, Bibertal to the east, and Weißenhorn to the south.

The landscape is predominantly rural, dominated by farmland and forests, corresponding to 76% and 19% of the land use respectively. Besides the Roth, the Leibi river also traverses the municipality at Hirbishofen.

== Historical overview ==
12th Century - There is mention of Pfaffenhoffen's castle, on the right bank of the Roth river.

1303 - First documented mention of Pfaffenhoffen, when Count Ulrich von Berg Schelklingen sold his county and the Pfaffenhofen castle to Frederick IV, Duke of Austria, for 700 silver marks.

1375 - The Church of St. Martin is founded.

1470 - The first schoolmaster arrives in Pfaffenhofen.

1618 - Beginning of the Thirty Years War, which devastated the area. The region was also beset by plague, which killed 2,000 of the original 2,300 inhabitants.

1700 - Census indicates that Pfaffenhofen has 30 residences and 190 inhabitants.

1720 - The first craft guild was formed by the house of Fugger. The guild met in the "Innere Taverne."

1725 - The Elizabeth Chapel was built as an addition to the Church of St. Martin. The church underwent modifications in the Baroque style.

1784 - House numbers were introduced for tax purposes.

1802 - An unidentified epidemic sweeps the area.

1805 - Napoleon stayed overnight at the 'Äußere Taverne.' From this place he issued a proclamation to his soldiers at the Battle of Ulm.

1806 - the Kingdom of Bavaria was formed by King Maximilian I, and incorporated Pfaffenhofen.

1835 - The census indicates that Pfaffenhofen had 53 residences with 270 inhabitants.

1838 - King Ludwig I of Bavaria lent Pfaffenhofen the coat of arms: a silver tin tower at a green hill under blue sky.

1856 - New building of a two-story schoolhouse on Hauptstraße. In 1908 it was expanded.

1899 - The town was connected to the electricity grid.

1900 - In 85 houses lived 320 inhabitants. The first medical practice with Dr. Sontheimer was opened.

1914 - World War I: The war, which took four years, demanded 110 soldiers. A bus line was introduced, which took over the suburban traffic from Weißenhorn to Neu-Ulm.

1919 - A police station with five officers was introduced, which was closed again in 1959.

1925 - A convent was built.

1928 - Hermann Köhl, Ehrenfried Günther Freiherr von Hünefeld and James Fitzmaurice crossed the Atlantic Sea from east to west with a plane.

1933 - 40 subscribers were connected to the telephone exchange of Pfaffenhofen.

1939 - The number of inhabitants rose to 420. World War II began and took six years, claiming the lives of 290 inhabitants. Eight buildings were destroyed by fire in 1944.

1946 - By accepting refugees, the number of inhabitants rose to 900.

1949 - Post-war redevelopment began with the "Millersiedlung" apartments, the first of their kind in Swabia.

1954 - The 'Martinssiedlung' followed, and after this the 'St.-Ulrich-Siedlung'. The building areas 'Rehgräble' and 'Osterholz' were also connected.

1959 - The number of inhabitants rose to 1250, among them 610 refugees. The St. Martins church was converted and increased to double in capacity. On the south exit of Pfaffenhofen was built an eight-class school with the name 'Hermann-Köhl-Schule'.

1960 - Building of the Protestant church 'Zum guten Hirten' at the Sonnhalde.

1974 - The 500-year anniversary of Pfaffenhofen was celebrated.

1978 - Pfaffenhofen and the neighbour Holzheim developed a central administrative body.

1987 - A new city hall at the Kirchplatz was built, including the Hermann-Köhl-Museum.

2000 - The number of inhabitants exceeds about 7000.

2003 - Pfaffenhofen celebrated the 700th anniversary of the first documentary mention back in 1303.

== Governance ==
As of January 2025, the local council consists of 21 members, including first mayor Sebastian Sparwasser (independent), second mayor Franz Winter (CSU) and third mayor Andreas Wöhrle (FW).

== Points of interest ==
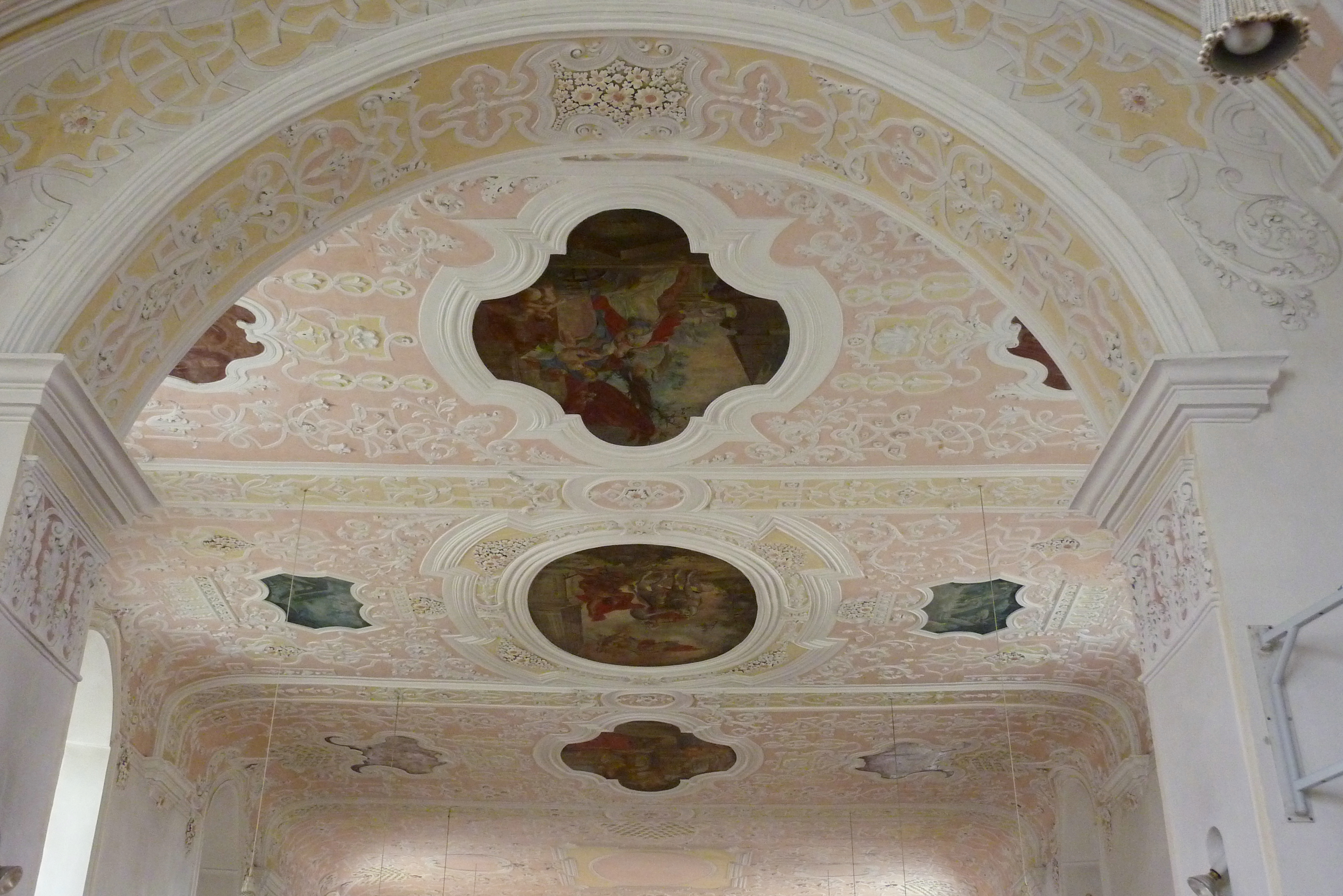
Frescoes in the church of St. Martin

The parish church of Saint Martin is the largest and most prominent church in Pfaffenhofen, featuring 14th-century frescoes of Saint Martin along the main nave. Its origins trace back to 1375, with its oldest sections built in Romanesque style. In 1450, the church was renovated in Gothic style, and in the 18th century, it underwent an extensive transformation in the Rococo style, including the iconic lantern dome added in 1761. In 1958, the church was expanded significantly to accommodate the growing population, including many displaced persons settling in the area after World War II. This restoration, led by Thomas Wechs, doubled the size of the worship space with the addition of northern and southern round extensions. The municipality is home to nine other notable churches, such as St. Ulrich in Diepertshofen and St. Leonhard in Roth, as well as 38 smaller religious monuments, including chapels, crosses, and the Lourdes grotto in Raunertshofen.

Since 1470 there has been a school master in Pfaffenhofen, while school houses are known since the beginning of the 19th century, and have been expanded and augmented with newly built schools as the population has risen. In 1959, a new school was built, and named the "Hermann-Köhl-Schule". Rising numbers of students and the lack of special rooms made an extension necessary, which was finished in 1997. Thus the "Hermann-Köhl-Schule" of Pfaffenhofen is the largest elementary- and main-school in the district of Neu-Ulm.

== Sports ==
Football: SV Pfaffenhofen became local league champion in the season 2004/2005.

== Infrastructure ==
Pfaffenhofen has a connection to the Donau-Iller-Nahverkehrsverbund. Bus lines:

- Weißenhorn - Pfaffenhofen - Holzheim - Neu-Ulm - Ulm
- Roggenburg - Niederhausen - Beuren - Pfaffenhofen - Nersingen - Glockerau
- Weißenhorn - Pfaffenhofen - Günzburg

Pfaffenhofen lies at the junction of the Günzburg - Babenhausen and Senden - Ichenhausen roads.

== Economy ==
Pfaffenhofen has been a local center for trade since it was first granted market rights in 1474. Today, the town hosts a weekly market featuring regional products and two major annual market days, one on Palm Sunday and another on the third Sunday of September. Additionally, festive events such as the Association's Market (Fest der Vereine) in July and Christmas markets in winter are popular highlights in the local calendar.

Companies headquartered in the municipality include the food producer Egle Lebensmittel and the IT solutions company NewTec GmbH. Lidl has its central depot for southeast Germany in Pfaffenhofen.

== Notable people ==
- Hermann Köhl (1888 – 1938), an aviation pioneer who piloted the first transatlantic flight by a fixed-wing aircraft from east to west.
- Friedrich Wagner (born 1943), a physicist and emeritus professor who specializes in plasma physics.
