= Neu-Ulm =

- Town
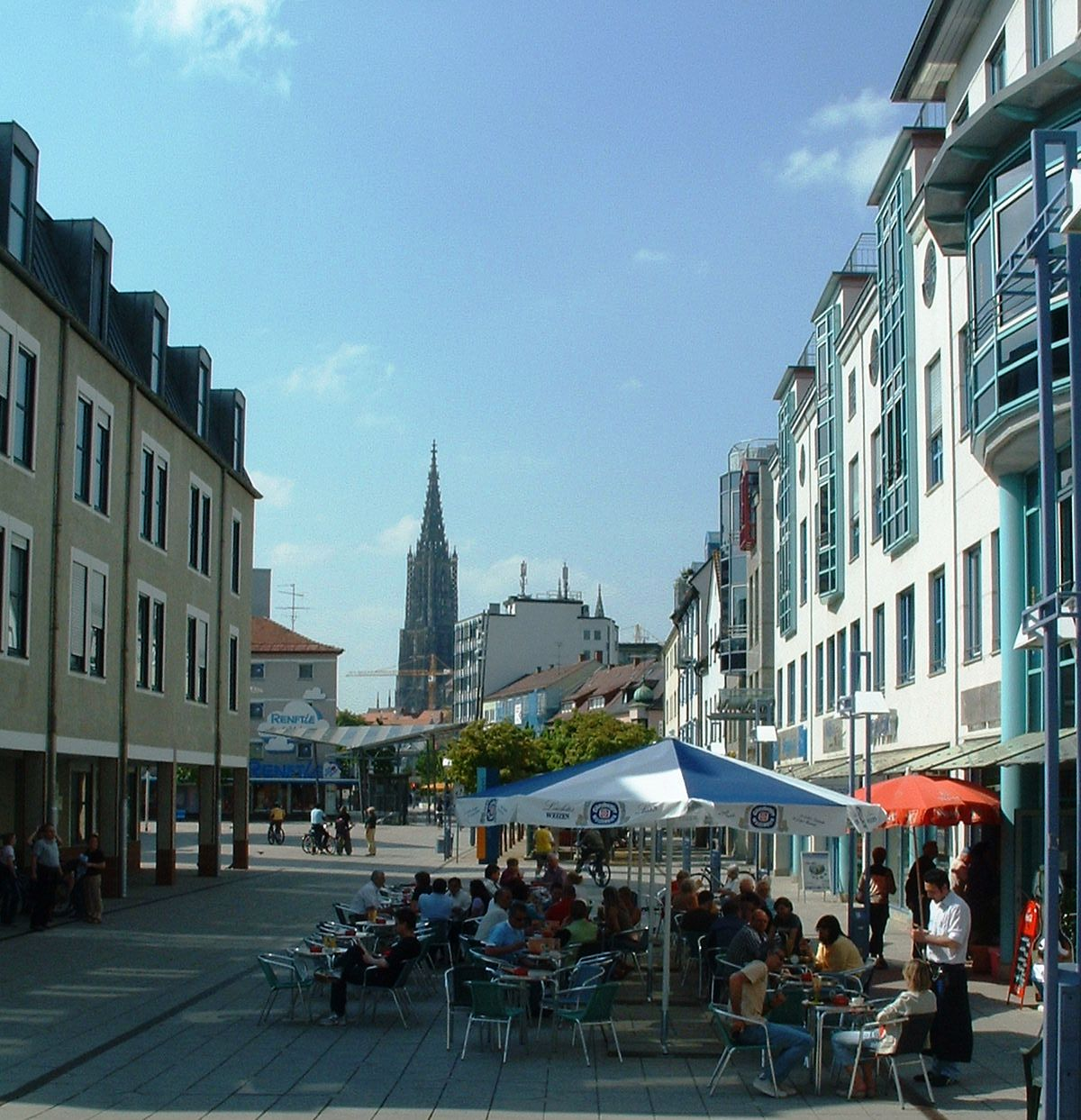
- Saint Peter's Square

- Coat of arms

- Location of Neu-Ulm within Neu-Ulm district
- Interactive map of Neu-Ulm
- Location within Germany Location within Bavaria
- Coordinates: 48°23′N 10°00′E
- Country: Germany
- State: Bavaria
- Admin. region: Schwaben
- District: Neu-Ulm
- Subdivisions: 12 Stadtteile

Government
  - Mayor (2026–32): Katrin Albsteiger (CSU)

Area
  - Total: 80.99 km^{2} (31.27 sq mi)
- Elevation: 470–527 m (1,542–1,729 ft)

Population (2025-12-31)
  - Total: 62,843
  - Density: 775.9/km^{2} (2,010/sq mi)
- Time zone: UTC+01:00 (CET)
  - Summer (DST): UTC+02:00 (CEST)
- Postal codes: 89201–89233
- Dialling codes: 0731, 07307, 07308
- Vehicle registration: NU
- Website: nu.neu-ulm.de

Neu-Ulm (German pronunciation: [nɔʏˈʔʊlm], lit. 'New Ulm'; Swabian: Nej-Ulm) is the seat of the Neu-Ulm district and a town in Swabia, Bavaria. Neighbouring towns include Ulm, Senden, Pfaffenhofen an der Roth, Holzheim, Nersingen and Elchingen. The population is 58,978 (31 December 2019).

== History ==
The modern history of Neu-Ulm began with the change of the sovereignty over the city of Ulm in 1810 from the Kingdom of Bavaria to the Kingdom of Württemberg. The Danube became the boundary between Bavaria and Württemberg. Land on the right bank of the Danube thus remained under Bavarian sovereignty. This was the beginning of Neu-Ulm's status as an independent town.

At this time Neu-Ulm was very small with little more than a few houses, taverns, pieces of land, and the village of Offenhausen. It was still known as Ulm am rechten Donauufer (Ulm on the right-hand side of the Danube). The name "Neu-Ulm" was first mentioned in records in 1814.

The town's real growth began a few decades later in 1841, when the Frankfurter Bundesversammlung announced the building of the Federal Fort of Ulm, the Bundesfestung. Upon the wishes of King Ludwig I, Neu-Ulm was included within the fort and the building work in Neu-Ulm was overseen by Major Theodor von Hildebrandt. After Neu-Ulm was connected to the railway line to Augsburg in 1853, soldiers arrived and a garrison was created there.

The city began to blossom under Mayor Josef Kollmann at the end of the 19th century. A tram line connecting Ulm and Neu-Ulm was built in 1897 and in 1900 the water tower (still a landmark today) was built, guaranteeing Neu-Ulm's water supply. In 1906, Neu-Ulm expanded beyond the city walls for the first time. The first factories were built, and it continued to expand.

After World War I, the garrison was closed. The population and wealth of the town grew, and it became a rich town. However, World War II left its mark; nearly eighty percent of the town was destroyed by Allied bombing, and all bridges across the Danube to Ulm were destroyed.

Rebuilding began, and from the end of World War II up to the 1990s, the US Army were stationed in Neu-Ulm. In 1968 the 1st Battalion, 81st Field Artillery Regiment moved from Wackernheim to Wiley Barracks. It was initially equipped with eight Pershing 1 nuclear missiles and in 1969 replaced these with 36 Pershing 1a missiles, replacing these with Pershing II missiles in 1984. The battalion was inactivated in 1986 and reformed as the 1st Battalion, 9th Field Artillery Regiment. With the ratification of the Intermediate-Range Nuclear Forces Treaty on 27 May 1988 the missiles were destroyed and the battalion was inactivated on 30 June 1991.

The departure of the US Army had a large impact on the town's economy and also left a large number of vacant army buildings.

== Coat of arms ==
In 1857, the town was given a coat of arms, although it was not legally a city at the time. It was first granted city status by King Ludwig II in 1869. The coat of arms consists of three horizontal bands of black, white and blue, with a tower in front. The tower symbolises the fort built around Neu-Ulm, the colours black and white indicate the relationship with Ulm, and the colours white and blue show the association with Bavaria.

== Districts ==
Neu-Ulm is arranged into 14 districts, 9 of them added between 1972 and 1977. The districts are: Burlafingen, Finningen, Gerlenhofen, Hausen, Holzschwang (including Tiefenbach), Jedelhausen, Ludwigsfeld, Neu-Ulm, Offenhausen, Pfuhl, Reutti, Schwaighofen, Steinheim and Wiley.

== Politics ==
Neu-Ulm is currently controlled by the Christian Social Union (CSU). The mayor is Katrin Albsteiger, elected in March 2020. Her predecessor was Gerold Noerenberg, who was in office between 2004 and 2020. He had succeeded Beate Merk, who had been appointed as Bavarian law minister by Edmund Stoiber on 14 October 2003.

Neu-Ulm is part of the Neu-Ulm (electoral district) for elections to the Bundestag.

The town council is arranged into four parliamentary groups with eight different parties and citizens' initiatives (the number of seats are shown in brackets):

- Christian Social Union (CSU) (16)
- Green Party (11)
- Social Democratic Party of Germany (SPD) (5)
- Free Voters' Union (FWG) (4)
- Pro Neu-Ulm (3)
- Free Democratic Party (FDP) (2)
- Young Union (2)
- The Left (Germany) (1)

== Education and science ==
In 1994, the Neu-Ulm Fachhochschule (University of Applied Sciences) was founded. The School of Economics was first opened as a branch office of the Fachhochschule Kempten im Allgäu, but has been independent since 1998. The Fachhochschule Neu-Ulm was initially located in the buildings of the former US base's Wiley Barracks, before expanding into two floors of the newly built Edison Center and then transferring to a new, larger building on the site of the former US base in summer 2008.

== Twin towns – sister cities ==
Neu-Ulm is twinned with:

- Bois-Colombes, a commune in the northwestern suburbs of Paris, France
- Meiningen, Thuringia, Germany
- New Ulm, Brown County, Minnesota, United States
- Trissino, in the province of Vicenza, Italy

== Notable people ==
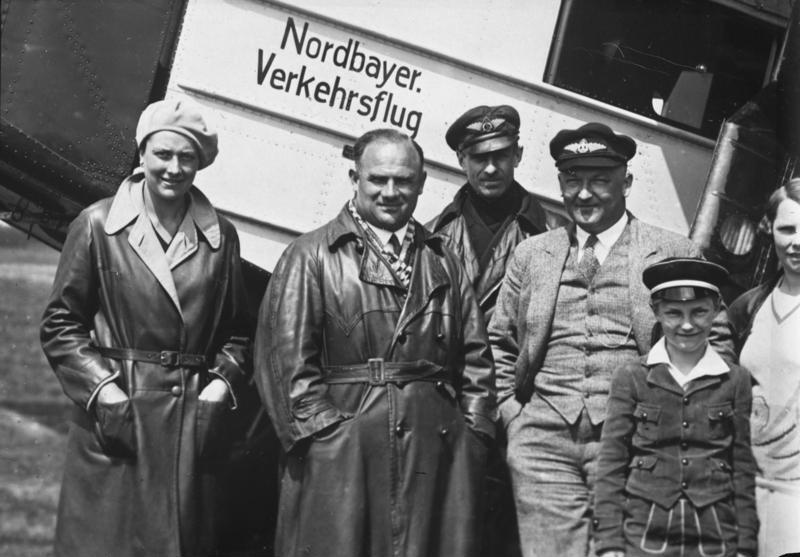
Hermann Köhl 1930 second from the left

- Otto Renner (1883–1960), botanist
- Edwin Scharff (1887–1955), sculptor and professor
- Hermann Köhl (1888–1938), flight pioneer
- Otto Haxel (1909–1998), nuclear physician
- Alfred Hans Zoller (1928–2006), composer of church songs, organ player
- Orest Banach (born 1948), footballer
- Magdalena Kopp (1948–2015), terrorist and wife of terrorist Carlos the Jackal
- Harald Schmidt (born 1957), actor, comedian and TV presenter
- Annette Thoma (1886–1974), composer and writer
- Timo Wenzel (born 1977), footballer
- Anna Prohaska (born 1983), Austrian lyric soprano
- Edwin Jackson (born 1983), American baseball player, Olympic silver medalist
- Urs Käufer (born 1984), rower
- Günay Güvenç (born 1991), Turkish footballer

=== Associated with the town ===
- Theo Waigel (born 1939), former finance minister of Germany
