= Roth (Danube) =

River in Germany

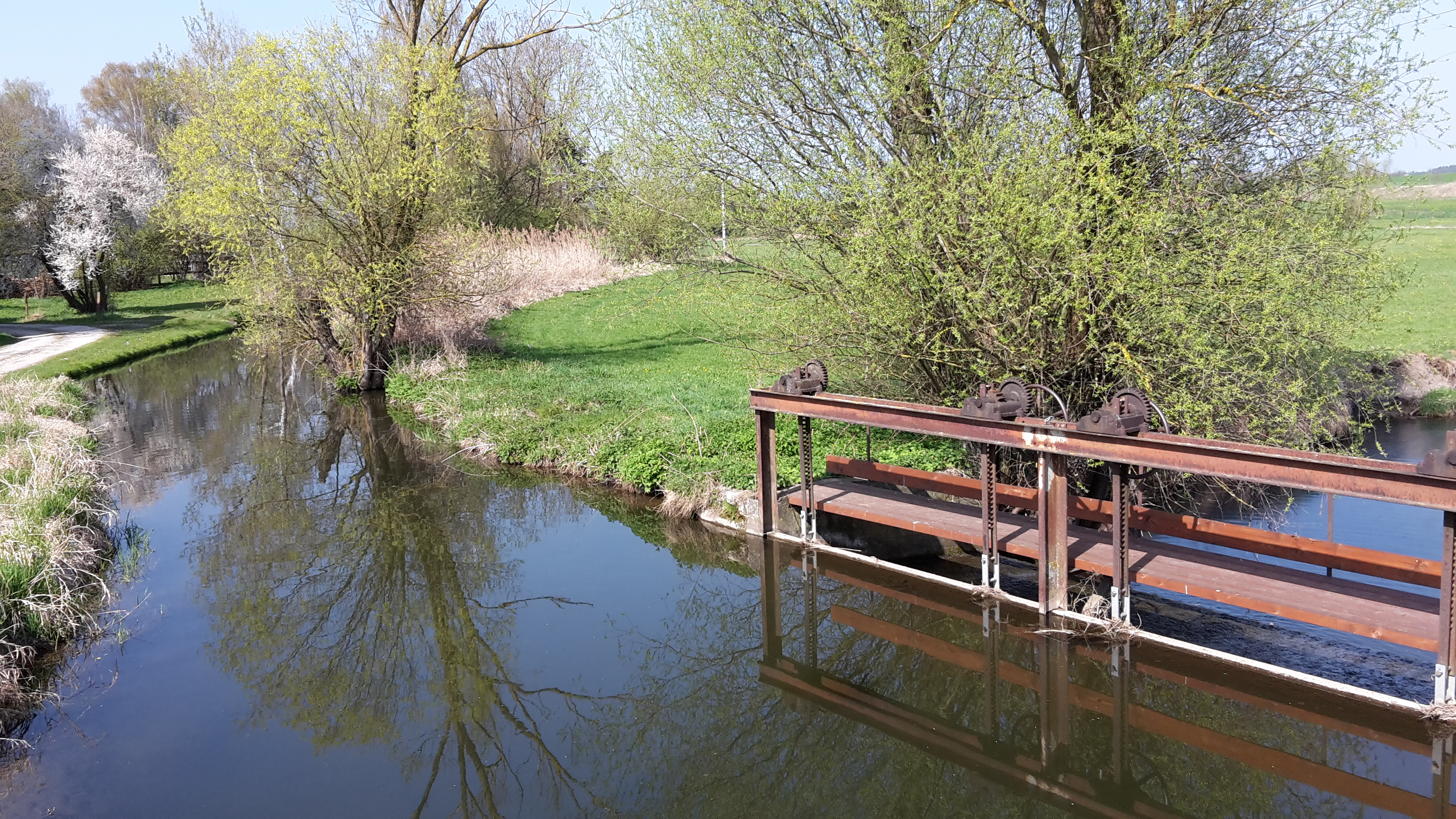
- The Roth between Remmeltshofen and Kadeltshofen (both boroughs of Pfaffenhofen)

Location
- Country: Germany
- State: Bavaria

Physical characteristics
- Mouth
  - location: Danube
  - coordinates: 48.4443°N 10.1547°E
- Length: 55.0 km (34.2 mi)
- Basin size: 211 km^{2} (81 sq mi)

Basin features
- Progression: Danube→ Black Sea

Roth (German pronunciation: [ʁoːt]) is a river of Bavaria, Germany. It is a right tributary of the Danube. It flows into the Danube near Nersingen.

== See also ==
- List of rivers of Bavaria
