= Osterberg =

- Municipality
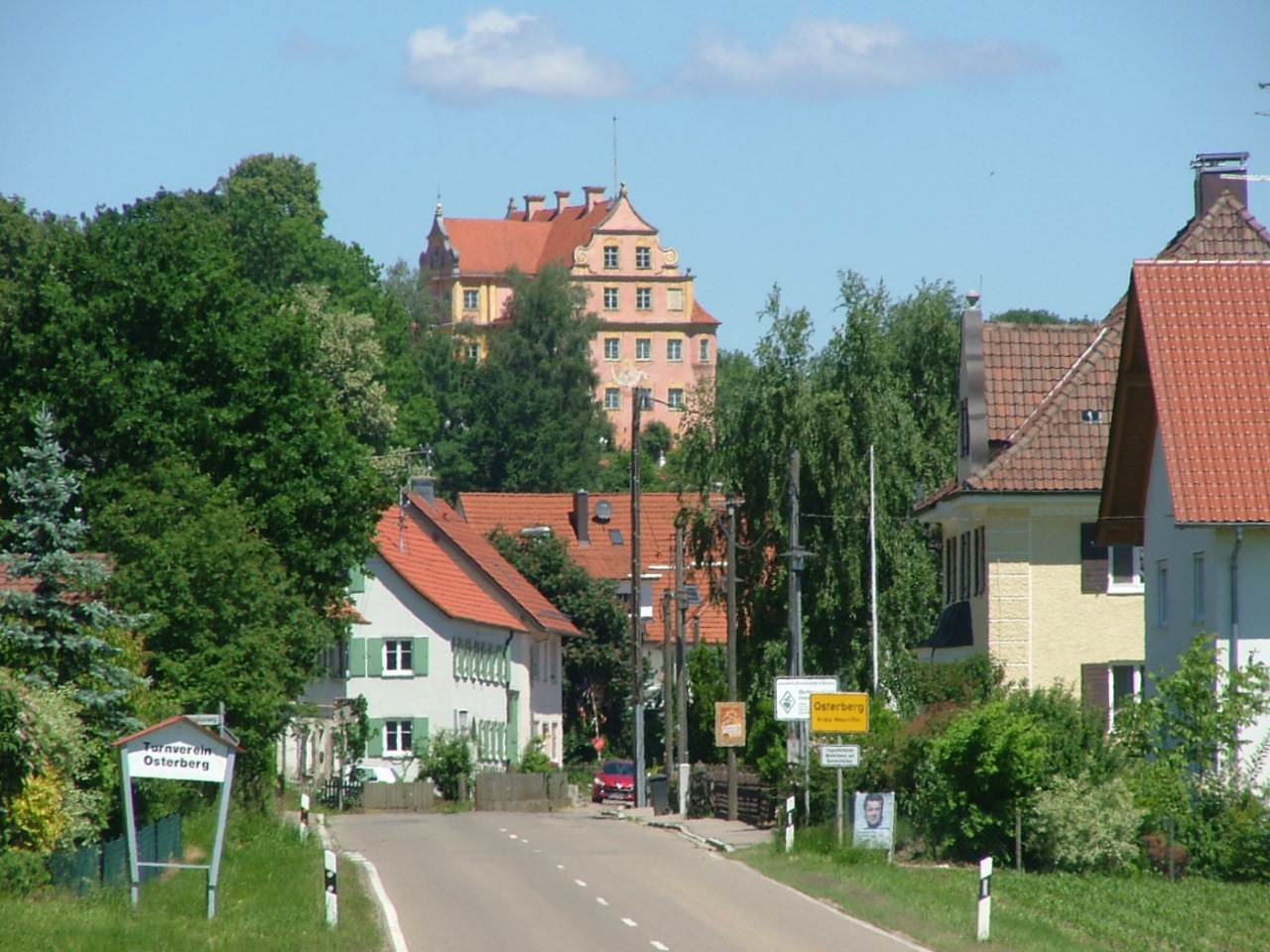
- Osterberg with the castle in the background

- Coat of arms

- Location of Osterberg within Neu-Ulm district
- Interactive map of Osterberg
- Location within Germany Location within Bavaria
- Coordinates: 48°9′N 10°10′E
- Country: Germany
- State: Bavaria
- Admin. region: Schwaben
- District: Neu-Ulm
- Municipal assoc.: Altenstadt
- Subdivisions: 2 Ortsteile

Government
  - Mayor (2020–26): Martin Werner

Area
  - Total: 13.79 km^{2} (5.32 sq mi)
- Elevation: 580 m (1,900 ft)

Population (2025-12-31)
  - Total: 921
  - Density: 66.8/km^{2} (173/sq mi)
- Time zone: UTC+01:00 (CET)
  - Summer (DST): UTC+02:00 (CEST)
- Postal codes: 89296
- Dialling codes: 08333
- Vehicle registration: NU
- Website: www.osterberg-weiler.de

Osterberg is a municipality in the district of Neu-Ulm in Bavaria in Germany.
