= Ichenhausen =

- Town
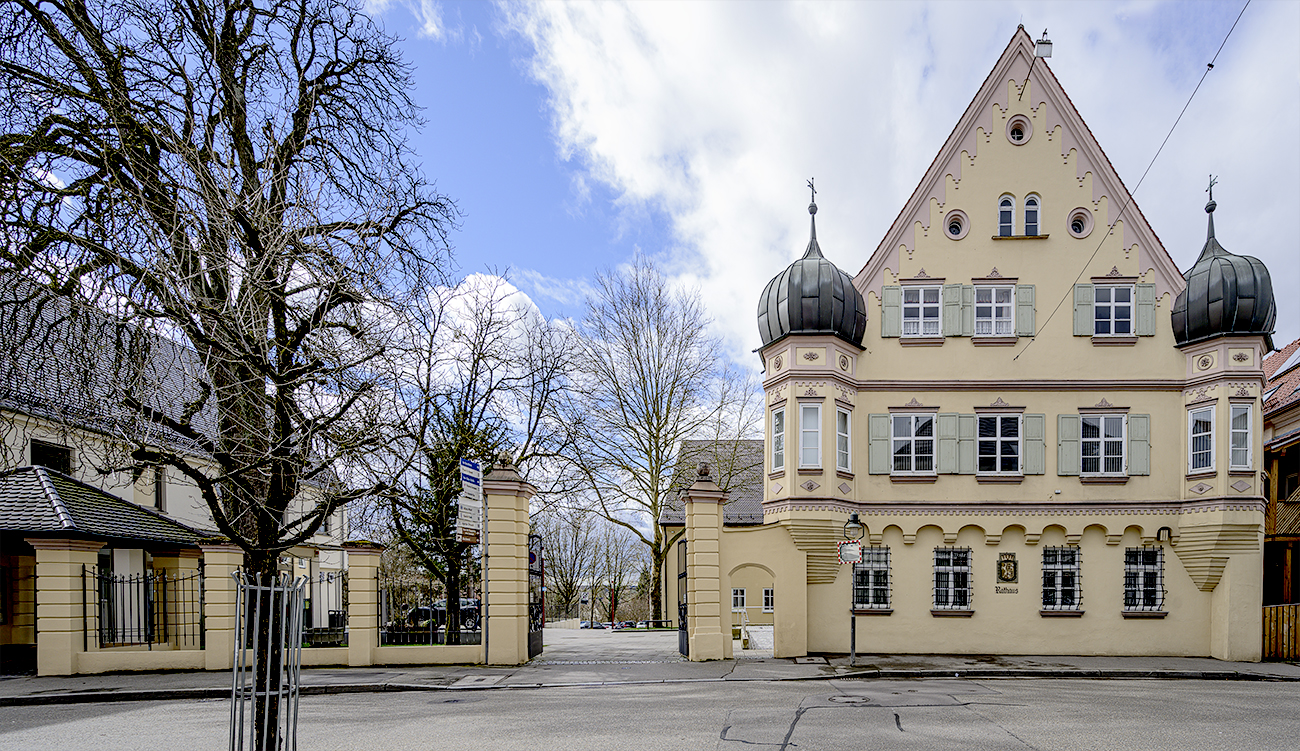
- Town hall

- Coat of arms

- Location of Ichenhausen within Günzburg district
- Interactive map of Ichenhausen
- Location within Germany Location within Bavaria
- Coordinates: 48°22′N 10°19′E
- Country: Germany
- State: Bavaria
- Admin. region: Schwaben
- District: Günzburg
- Municipal assoc.: Ichenhausen

Government
  - Mayor (2020–26): Robert Strobel (CSU)

Area
  - Total: 34.27 km^{2} (13.23 sq mi)
- Elevation: 489 m (1,604 ft)

Population (2025-12-31)
  - Total: 9,354
  - Density: 273.0/km^{2} (706.9/sq mi)
- Time zone: UTC+01:00 (CET)
  - Summer (DST): UTC+02:00 (CEST)
- Postal codes: 89335
- Dialling codes: 08223
- Vehicle registration: GZ
- Website: www.ichenhausen.de

Ichenhausen (German pronunciation: [ɪçn̩ˈhaʊzn̩]) is a town in the district of Günzburg, in Bavaria, Germany. It is situated on the river Günz, 9 km south of Günzburg.

== History ==
=== Early history ===
The Lords of Roth had been feudal lord of the village since the early 14th century. In 1406 the town was granted market rights. In 1574 the barons of Stain von Rechtenstein zu Niederstotzingen acquired the village. With the 1806 Treaty of the Confederation of the Rhine, the town came to the Kingdom of Bavaria and in 1818 became a patrimonial community according to new Constitution of the Kingdom and the communal act, which lasted until 1843 when the patrimonial status ended and it became a regular community. In 1913 Ichenhausen was elevated to city status.

For centuries, Jewish families have lived in the village. They set up their own Jewish cemetery on the road to Krumbach and built a synagogue in 1687. This was renewed in 1781.

=== 20th century ===
In 1933, 13% of the population was Jewish. At the November pogrom in 1938, the synagogue and the Jewish cemetery were destroyed, organized by the NSDAP. In a criminal trial before the Memmingen Regional Court in 1948, seven people were sentenced to prison for this reason.

Many Jewish citizens moved to larger cities where they felt more secure in anonymity or emigrated abroad. Those left behind were deported and killed; 1942 (82 people to Lublin, 28 people to Theresienstadt) and 1943 (ten people to Auschwitz); only one woman survived.

=== The collapse of the church tower ===
In 1964 the old Catholic church St. Johannes was extended and partly rebuilt. The church tower collapsed on Easter Monday in 1964 as a result of the reconstruction work. No injuries were sustained.

=== Incorporations ===
Ichenhausen has incorporated five other communities. Hochwang was incorporated on January 1, 1971. Oxenbronn was added on 1 July 1971. On 1 May 1978, the communities of Autenried, Deubach and Rieden an der Kötz followed in the course of the territorial reform.

== Districts ==
Ichenhausen is arranged into six districts:

- Ichenhausen
- Autenried
- Deubach
- Hochwang
- Oxenbronn
- Rieden an der Kötz

== People ==
- Gregor Ebner, leader doctor of all the Nazi Lebensborn Homes
- Ernst Hardt, German playwright, poet, and novelist
- Henry Hochheimer, assistant rabbi of Ichenhausen and rabbi in Baltimore, Maryland
- Joseph Ehrenfried Hofmann, German historian of mathematics
- Simon Koshland, American businessman and wool merchant, patriarch of the Koshland and Haas family of San Francisco
- Hayman Hirsch Perlmutter, a cantor - father of Pauline Perlmutter Steinem

== Sights ==
In Ichenhausen is the Bavarian School Museum, a branch museum of the Bayerisches Nationalmuseum. Another cultural asset in Ichenhausen is the former synagogue, which served as a fire station after the Second World War and was converted into a "House of Encounter" in the late 1980s. The Jewish Cemetery is also one of the sightseeings. In the Autenried district there is the Schloss Autenried from the beginning of the 18th century with a museum of paintings and a library.

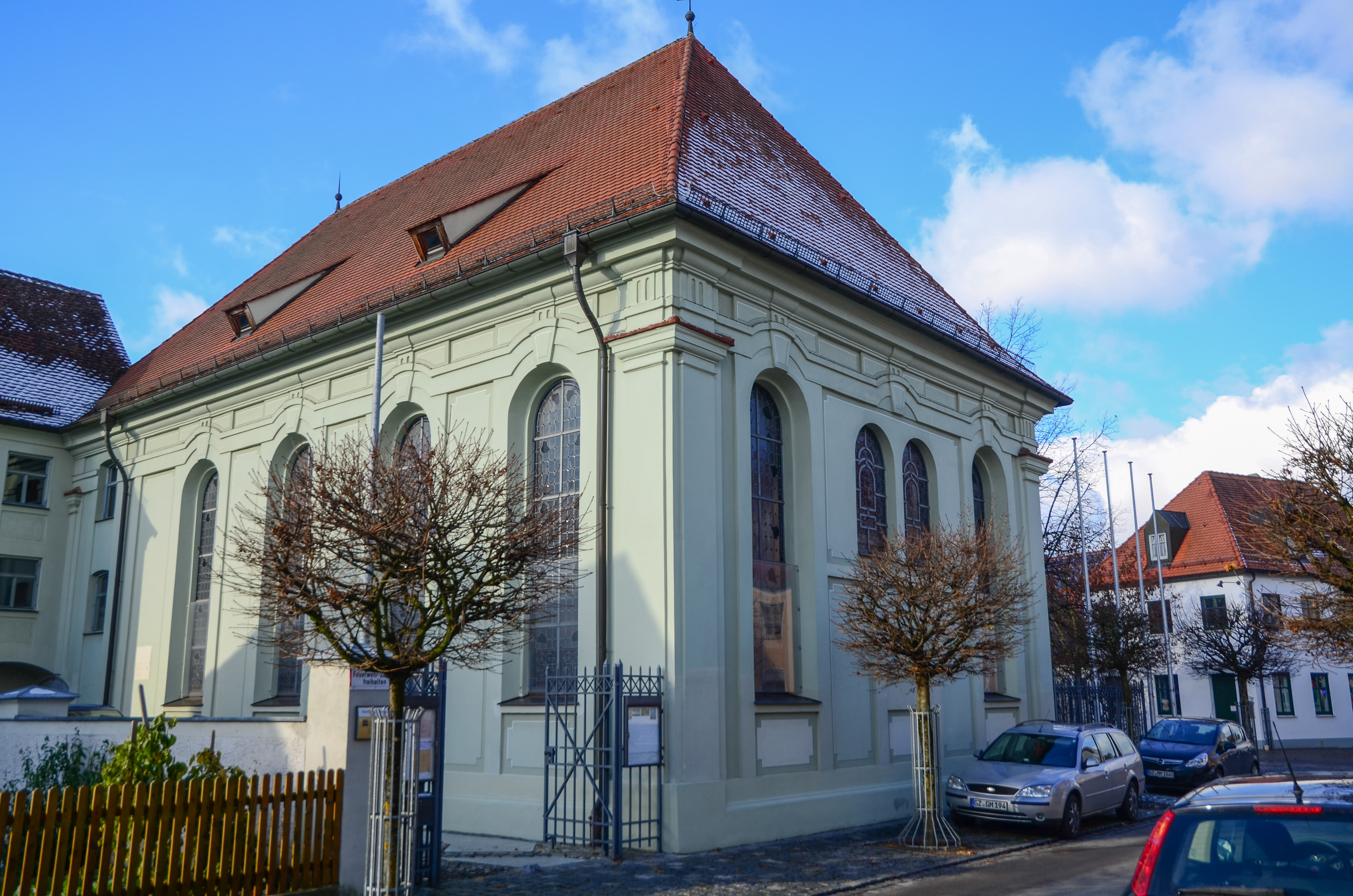
Former Synagogue, now House of Encounter

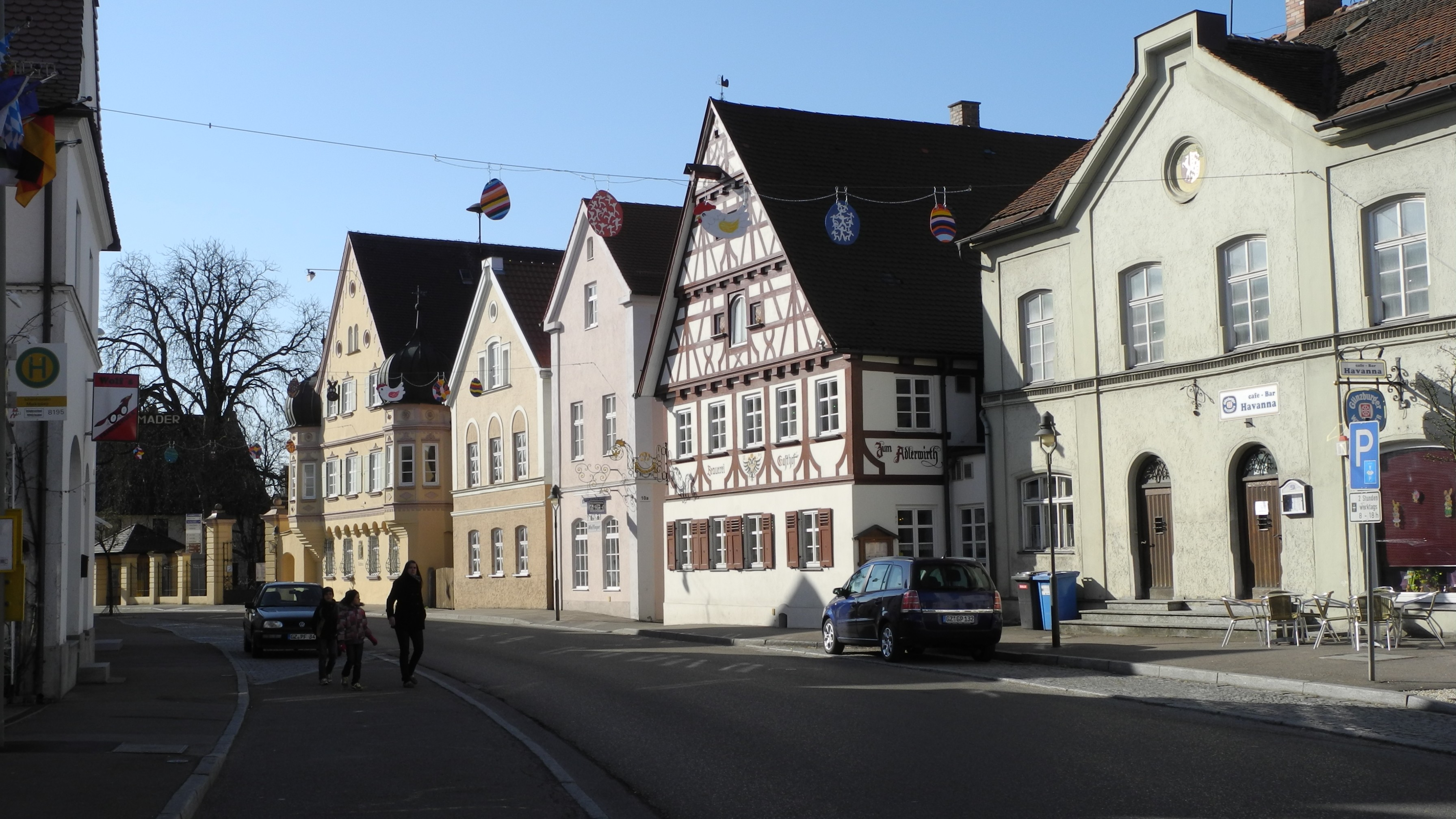
Main street of Ichenhausen

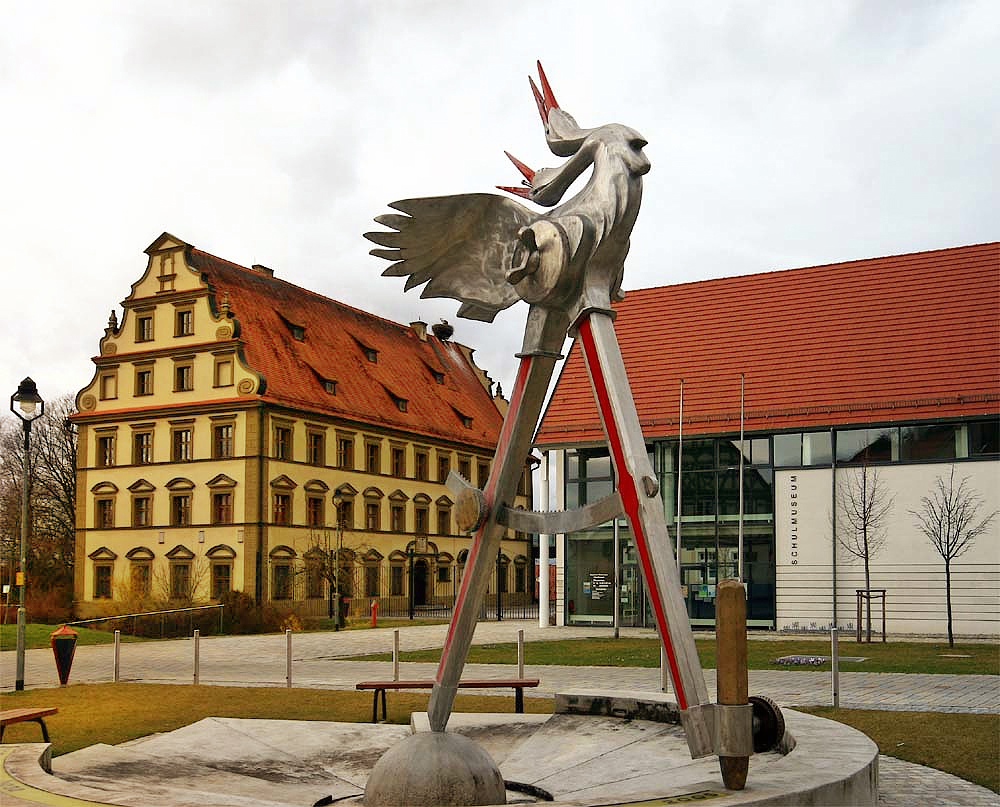
Schloßplatz with castle (left) and museum (right)

== See also ==
- Synagogues of the Swabian type (Ichenhausen)
