= Altenstadt (Verwaltungsgemeinschaft, Swabia) =

- Verwaltungsgemeinschaft
- Location of Altenstadt within Neu-Ulm district
- Interactive map of Altenstadt
- Location within Germany Location within Bavaria
- Coordinates: 48°10′N 10°07′E
- Country: Germany
- State: Bavaria
- Admin. region: Swabia
- District: Neu-Ulm
- Seat: Altenstadt
- Subdivisions: 3 municipalities

Area
  - Total: 53.61 km^{2} (20.70 sq mi)

Population (2025-12-31)
  - Total: 7,910
  - Density: 148/km^{2} (382/sq mi)
- Time zone: UTC+01:00 (CET)
  - Summer (DST): UTC+02:00 (CEST)
- Website: www.altenstadt-vg.de

Altenstadt is a Verwaltungsgemeinschaft (municipal association) in the district of Neu-Ulm in Bavaria, Germany. Its seat is in Altenstadt.

It consists of the following municipalities:

1. Altenstadt
2. Kellmünz
3. Osterberg
