= Pfaffenhofen an der Roth (Verwaltungsgemeinschaft) =

- Verwaltungsgemeinschaft
- Location of Pfaffenhofen an der Roth within Neu-Ulm district
- Interactive map of Pfaffenhofen an der Roth
- Location within Germany Location within Bavaria
- Coordinates: 48°21′N 10°10′E
- Country: Germany
- State: Bavaria
- Admin. region: Swabia
- District: Neu-Ulm
- Seat: Pfaffenhofen an der Roth
- Subdivisions: 2 municipalities

Area
  - Total: 50.28 km^{2} (19.41 sq mi)

Population (2025-12-31)
  - Total: 9,260
  - Density: 184/km^{2} (477/sq mi)
- Time zone: UTC+01:00 (CET)
  - Summer (DST): UTC+02:00 (CEST)

Pfaffenhofen an der Roth is a Verwaltungsgemeinschaft (municipal association) in the district of Neu-Ulm in Bavaria, Germany. Its seat is in Pfaffenhofen an der Roth.

It consists of the following municipalities:

1. Holzheim
2. Pfaffenhofen an der Roth
