= Ernst Hardt =

German playwright, poet, and novelist (1876–1947)

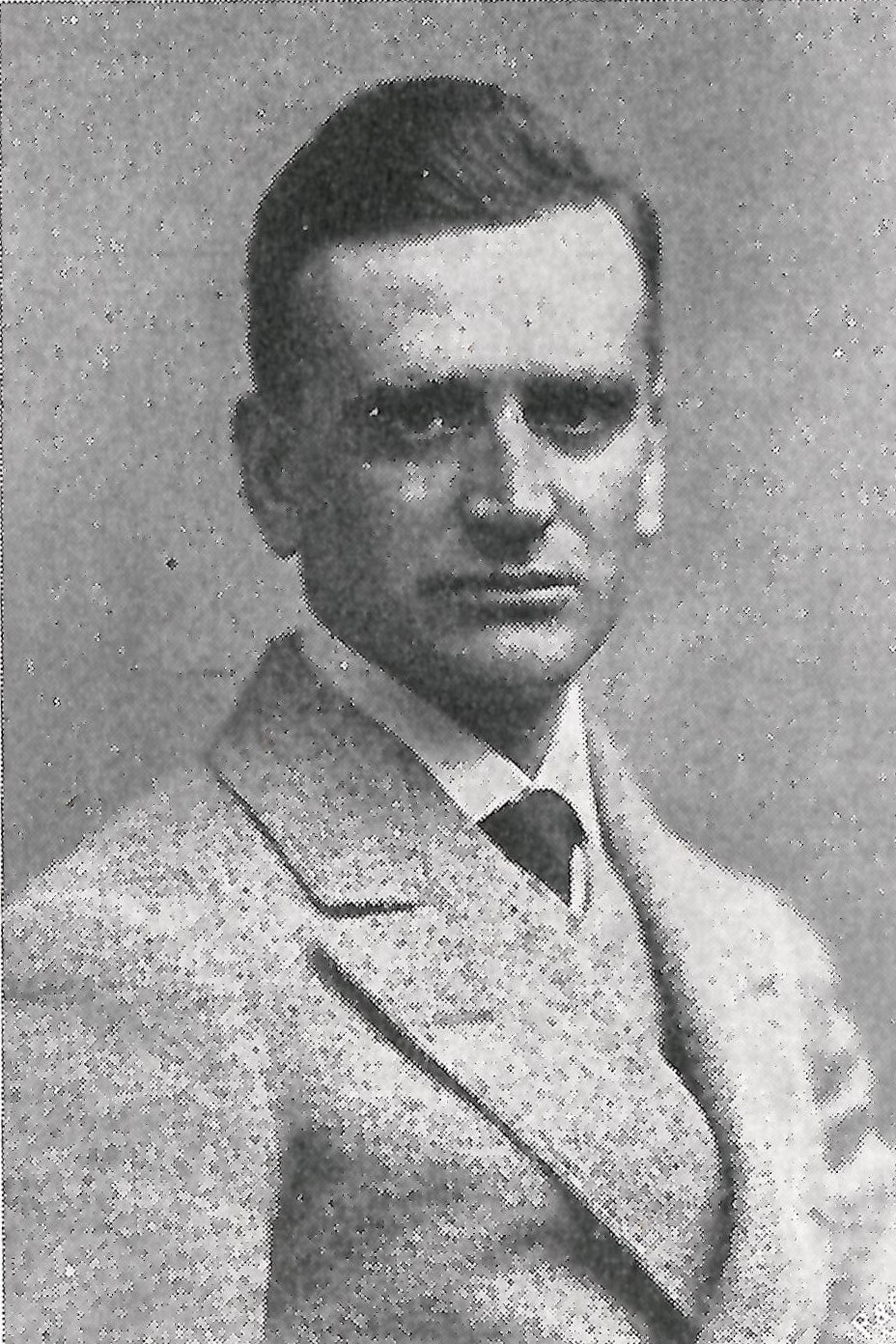
Ernst Hardt

Friedrich Wilhelm Ernst Hardt (9 May 1876 – 3 January 1947), born Ernst Stöckhardt, was a German playwright, poet, and novelist.

Hardt was born in Graudenz, West Prussia (now Grudziądz, Poland).

He is the author of Priester des Todes (1898), Bunt ist das Leben (1902), An den Toren des Lebens (1904), and the plays Der Kampf ums Rosenrote (1903), Ninon von Lenclos (1905), Tantris der Narr (1907), Gudrun (1911), and Konig Salomo (1915). He was director of the National Theater in Weimar (1919–24), the Schauspiel Köln in Cologne (1925), and the Westdeutscher Rundfunk (West German Broadcasting Co). (1926–1933).

He worked with Bertolt Brecht on some experimental radio broadcasts.

He was removed from his position with the Westdeutscher Rundfunk by the Nazis in 1933. A few months later he was imprisoned for a short period and then took refuge in the Sankt Anna Hospital in Cologne-Lindenthal. He was later acquitted in the "broadcast trial" and able, for a time, to resume some literary activities.

Hardt died in 1947 in Ichenhausen.
