= Buch, Swabia =

Buch
- Municipality
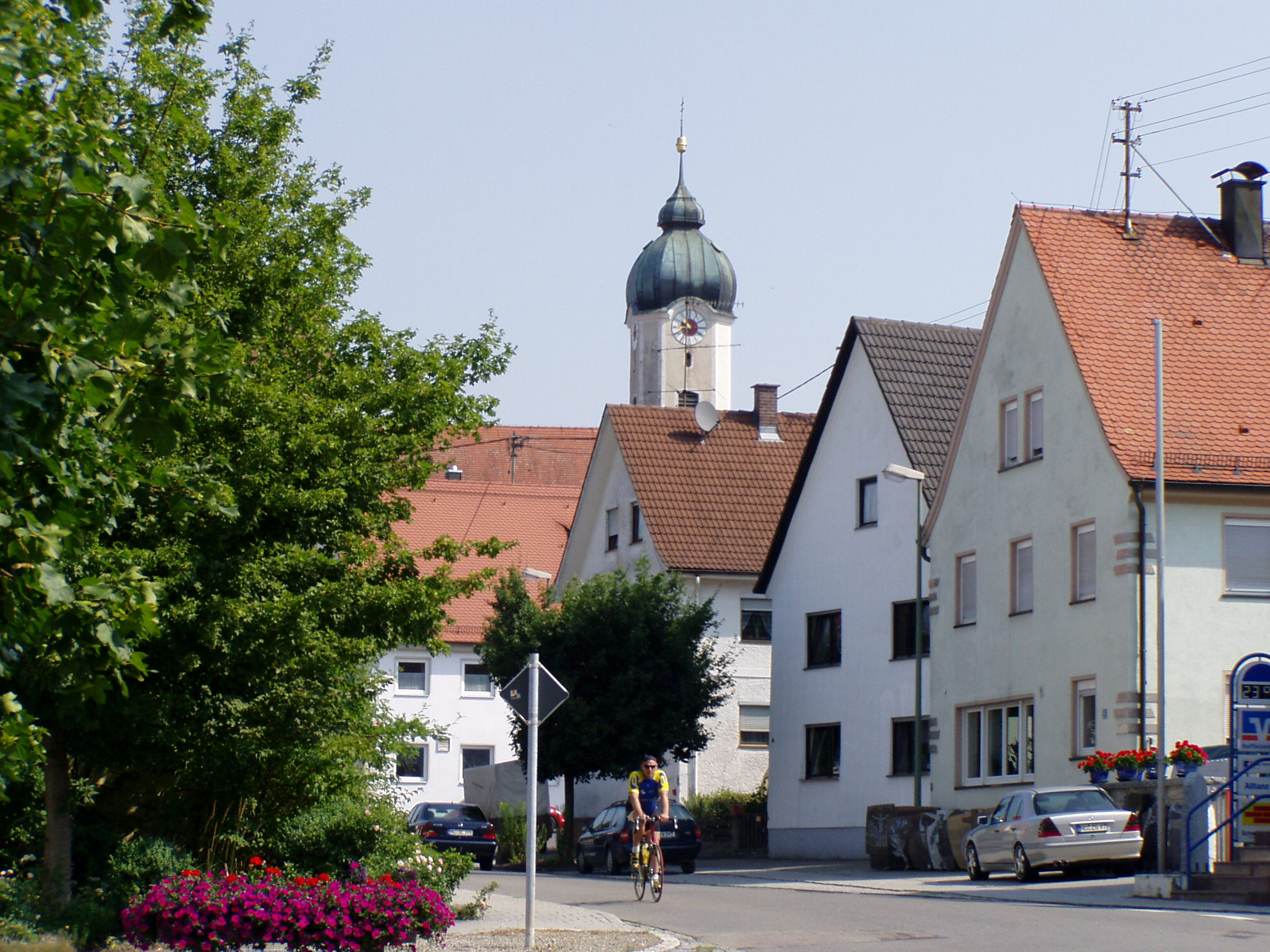
- Main street in Buch with the Church of Saint Valentine

- Coat of arms

- Location of Buch within Neu-Ulm district
- Interactive map of Buch
- Location within Germany Location within Bavaria
- Coordinates: 48°13′N 10°10′E
- Country: Germany
- State: Bavaria
- Admin. region: Schwaben
- District: Neu-Ulm
- Municipal assoc.: Buch

Government
  - Mayor (2020–26): Markus Wöhrle

Area
  - Total: 40.06 km^{2} (15.47 sq mi)
- Elevation: 540 m (1,770 ft)

Population (2025-12-31)
  - Total: 4,340
  - Density: 108/km^{2} (281/sq mi)
- Time zone: UTC+01:00 (CET)
  - Summer (DST): UTC+02:00 (CEST)
- Postal codes: 89290
- Dialling codes: 07343
- Vehicle registration: NU
- Website: www.vg-buch.de

Buch (German pronunciation: [buːx]) is a municipality in the district of Neu-Ulm in Bavaria in Germany.
