= Altenstadt, Swabia =

Altenstadt
- Municipality
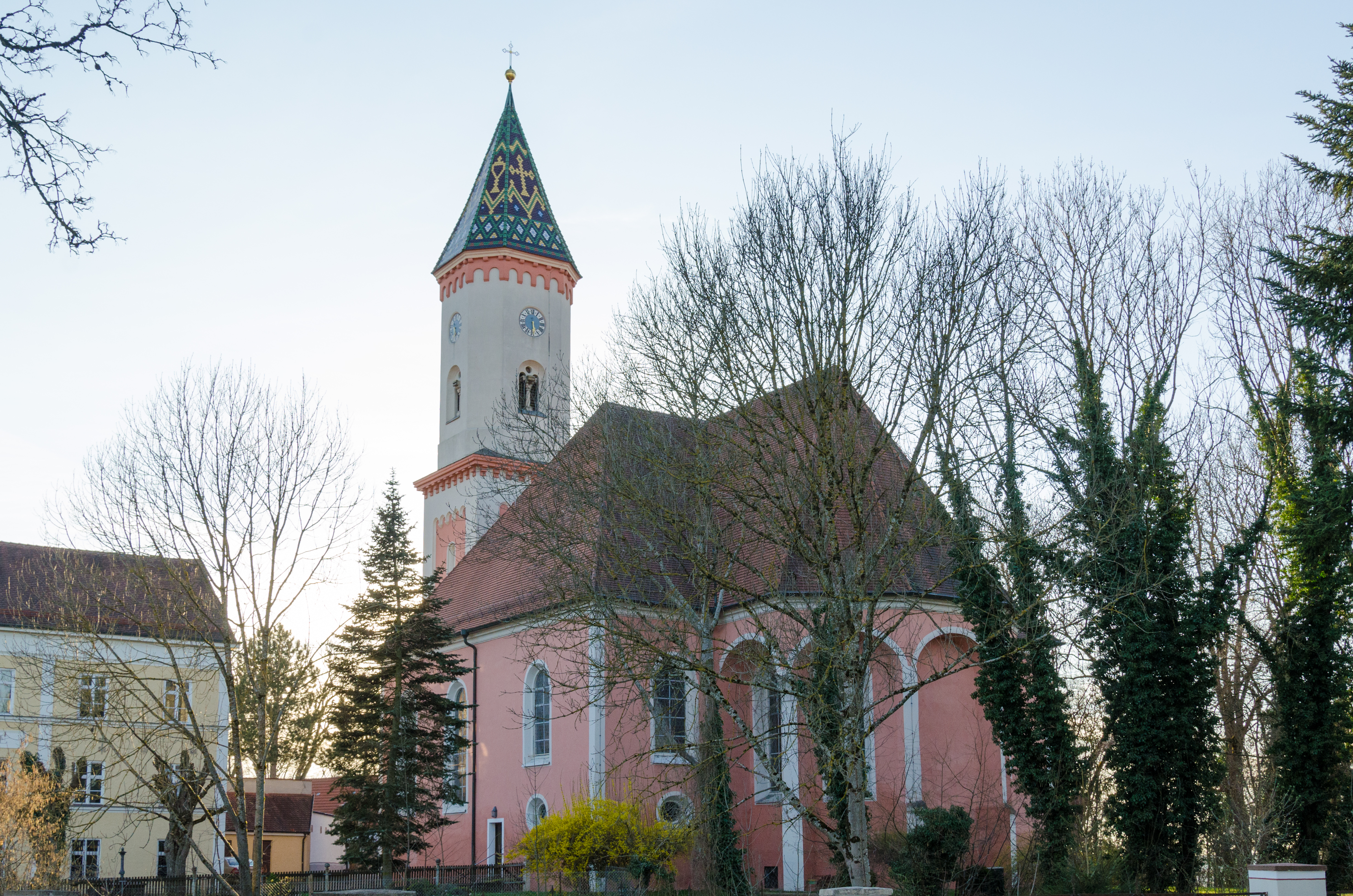
- Church of the Assumption of the Virgin Mary in Illereichen

- Coat of arms

- Location of Altenstadt within Neu-Ulm district
- Interactive map of Altenstadt
- Location within Germany Location within Bavaria
- Coordinates: 48°10′N 10°07′E
- Country: Germany
- State: Bavaria
- Admin. region: Schwaben
- District: Neu-Ulm
- Municipal assoc.: Altenstadt
- Subdivisions: 7 quarters

Government
  - Mayor (2020–26): Wolfgang Höß (CSU)

Area
  - Total: 31.3 km^{2} (12.1 sq mi)
- Elevation: 530 m (1,740 ft)

Population (2025-12-31)
  - Total: 5,417
  - Density: 173/km^{2} (448/sq mi)
- Time zone: UTC+01:00 (CET)
  - Summer (DST): UTC+02:00 (CEST)
- Postal codes: 89281
- Dialling codes: 08337
- Vehicle registration: NU, ILL
- Website: www.altenstadt-iller.de

Altenstadt (German pronunciation: [ˈaltn̩ʃtat]) is a municipality in the district of Neu-Ulm in Bavaria in Germany.

The municipality is located in middle Swabia in the valley of the Iller, about 30 km south of Ulm and 25 km north of Memmingen.

== Districts ==
Altenstadt is arranged into 7 districts. The districts are:

- Altenstadt
- Bergenstetten
- Dattenhausen
- Filzingen
- Herrenstetten
- Illereichen
- Untereichen

== Sights ==
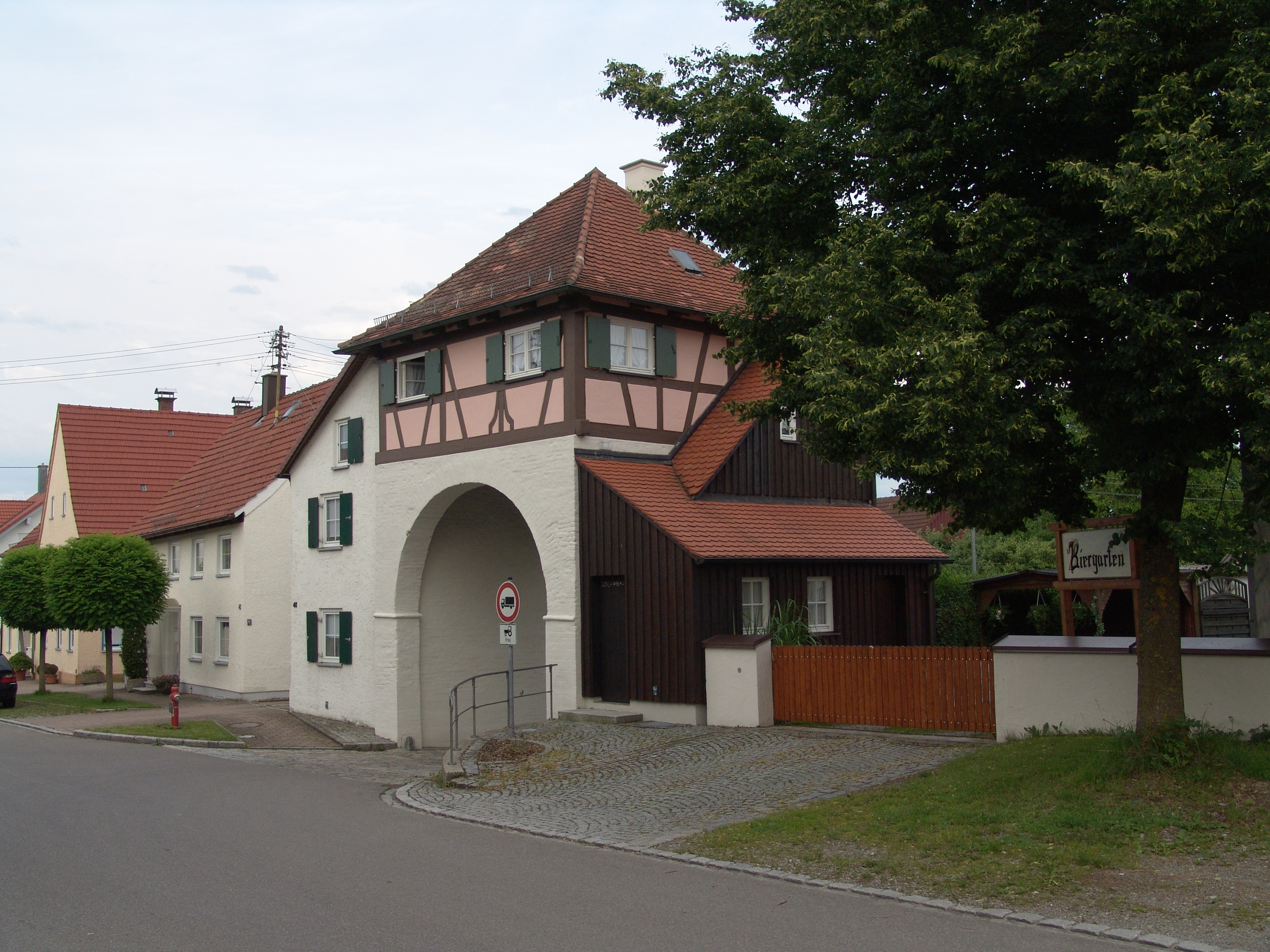
Torhaus, Illereichen

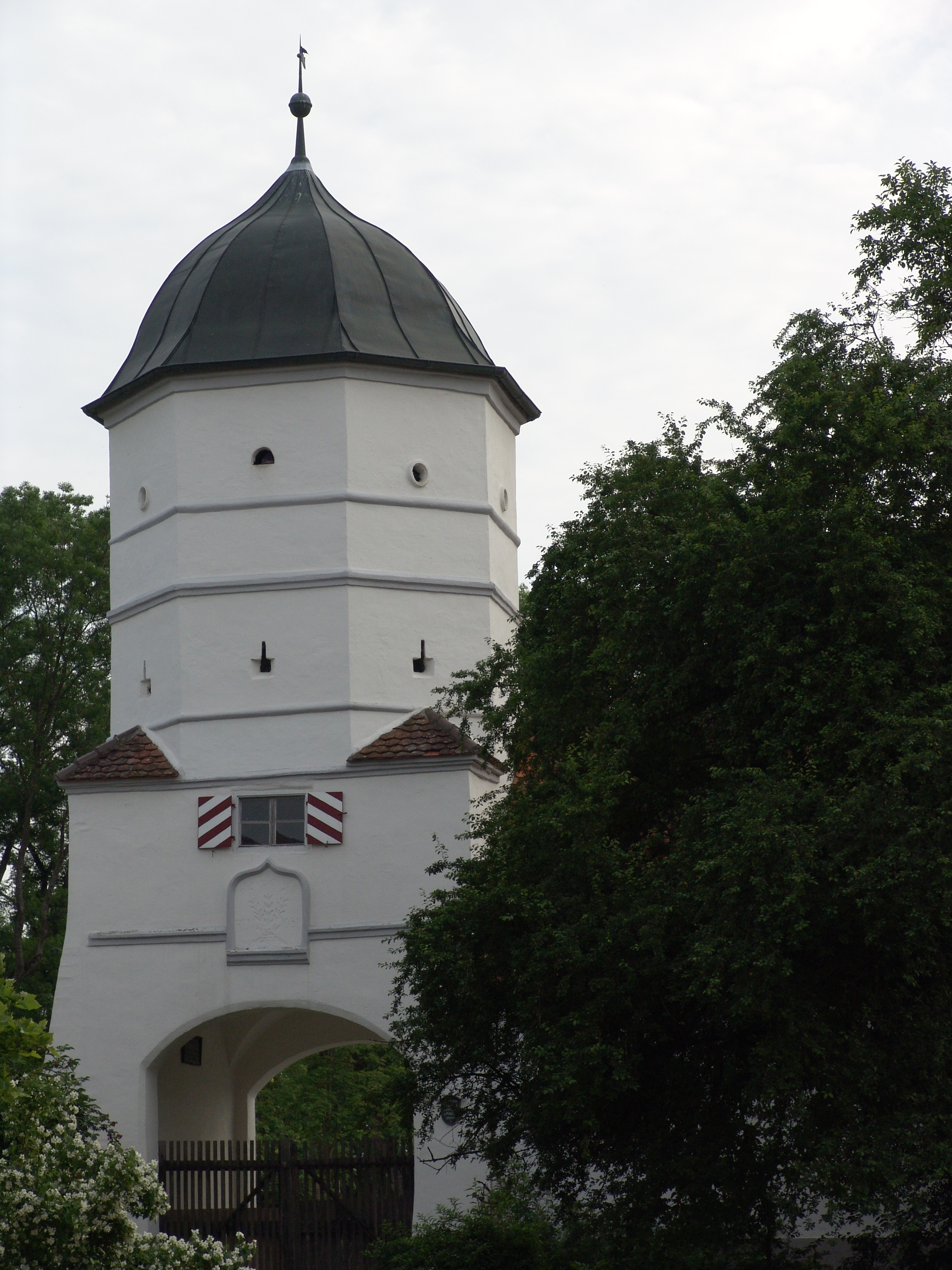
Tower of a former castle complex

== See also ==
- Synagogues of the Swabian type (Altenstadt)
