= Synagogues of the Swabian type =

Swabian-type former synagogues in Bavaria, Germany

Altenstadt Synagogue
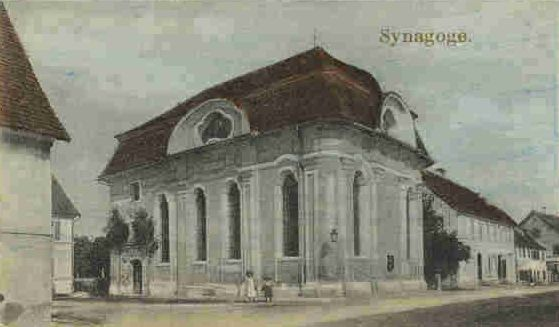
- The Altenstadt synagogue

Religion
- Affiliation: Judaism (former)
- Ecclesiastical or organizational status: Synagogue (1803–1938)
- Status: Demolished

Location
- Location: Altenstadt, Bavaria
- Country: Germany

Architecture
- Completed: 1803
- Demolished: 1955

Ichenhausen Synagogue
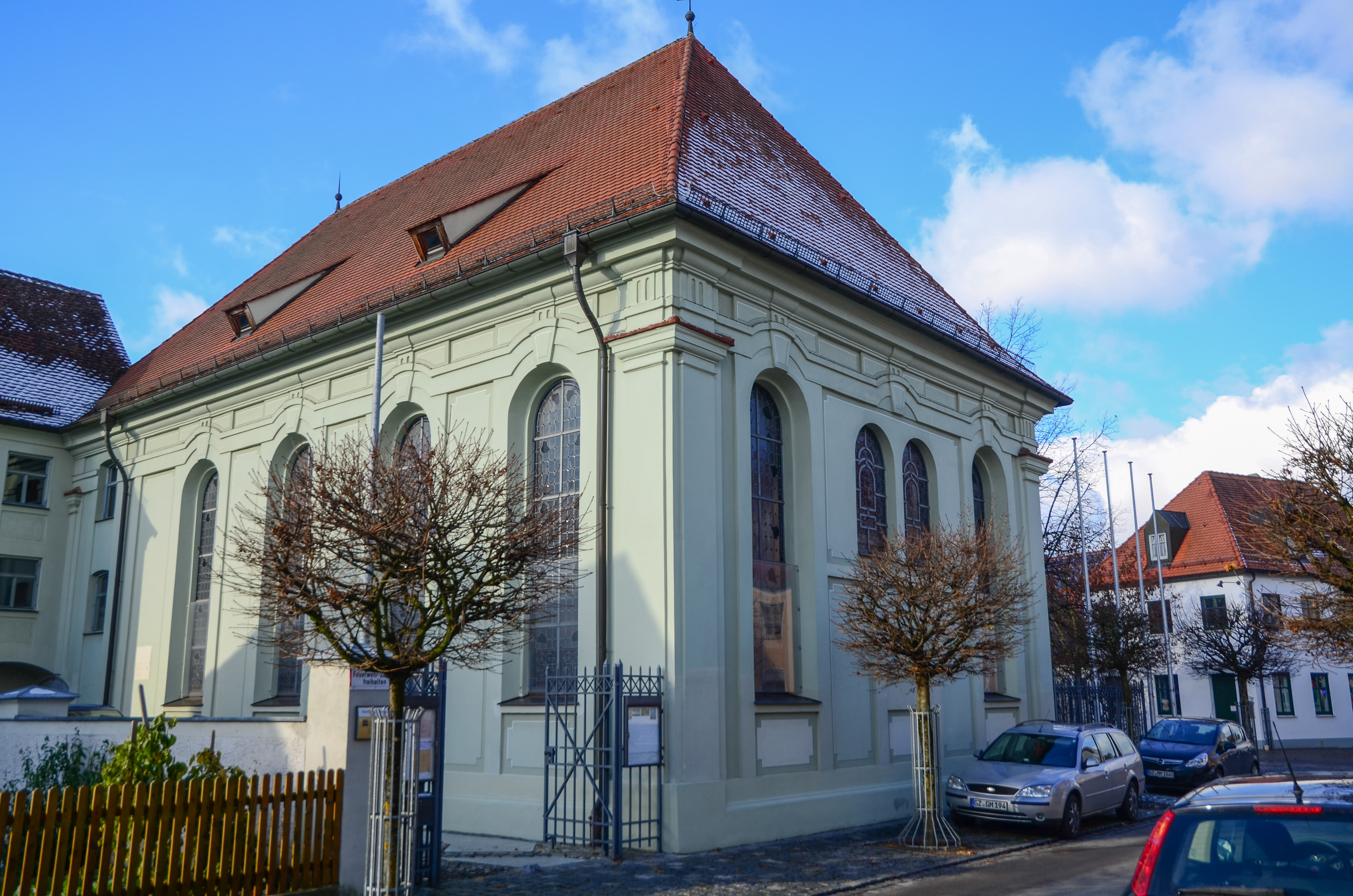
- The Ichenhausen synagogue, in 2013

Religion
- Affiliation: Judaism (former)
- Ecclesiastical or organizational status: Synagogue (1781–1938); Fire station (1958–1985); Cultural center (since 1985)
- Status: Abandoned (as a synagogue); Repurposed

Location
- Location: Ichenhausen, Bavaria
- Country: Germany

Architecture
- Completed: 1781

The Synagogues of the Swabian type are former Jewish synagogues built between 1780 and 1820 in Swabia, in testate of Bavaria, in Germany. They were synagogues of a specific style, reflecting the growing self-confidence and the increased acceptance of the Jews of Swabia in the 18th century.

== History ==
In the Middle Ages, the Jews in Germany were expelled from the cities to the countryside and to the margins of society. Therefore, they settled usually isolated and sporadic, without considerable Jewish community life. Towards the end of the 16th century there were signs of a Jewish reorganization. Jews began to re-establish Jewish communities in the villages and have started to build synagogues. In Swabia, this was happening faster, than elsewhere in Germany.

Between 1780 and 1820 the region developed its own Swabian style of synagogues, inspired by the Empire style. The following former synagogues are examples of this specific Swabian style. All of them were plundered and vandalized in November 1938 during Kristallnacht. From this time, the buildings ceased being used as synagogues.

=== Altenstadt ===
This synagogue was completed in 1803 in Illereichen, the former name of Altenstadt. The synagogue was vandalized by Nazis during Kristallnacht, and was demolished in 1955.

=== Ichenhausen ===
This synagogue was built in 1781 in Ichenhausen. In 1938 it was vandalized and later used as a warehouse for the Wehrmacht. From 1958 to 1985 the municipality used the building as a fire station. Thanks to the Aktionskreis Synagoge Ichenhausen e. V. the synagogue was authentically restored from 1984 to 1987. Today, it is a "House of Encounter". On the upper floor, there is a permanent exhibition about Judaism in the Swabian countryside.

=== Krumbach ===
This synagogue was built in 1818 in Hürben; now part of Krumbach. It is very similar to the synagogue of Ichenhausen. The synagogue was vandalized in 1938, burnt down in 1939, and demolished by the Nazis in 1942.

=== Wallerstein ===
This synagogue was built between 1805 and 1807 in Wallerstein. The Nazis vandalized the synagogue in 1938 and used it later as warehouse. Today, there is a bank in the building.

== See also ==
- History of the Jews in Germany
- List of synagogues in Germany (in German)
