= Buch (Verwaltungsgemeinschaft) =

- Verwaltungsgemeinschaft
- Location of Buch within Neu-Ulm district
- Interactive map of Buch
- Location within Germany Location within Bavaria
- Coordinates: 48°13′N 10°11′E
- Country: Germany
- State: Bavaria
- Admin. region: Swabia
- District: Neu-Ulm
- Seat: Buch
- Subdivisions: 3 municipalities

Area
  - Total: 65.39 km^{2} (25.25 sq mi)

Population (2025-12-31)
  - Total: 6,409
  - Density: 98.01/km^{2} (253.8/sq mi)
- Time zone: UTC+01:00 (CET)
  - Summer (DST): UTC+02:00 (CEST)
- Website: www.vg-buch.de

Buch is a Verwaltungsgemeinschaft (municipal association) in the district of Neu-Ulm in Bavaria, Germany. Its seat is in Buch.

It consists of the following municipalities:

1. Buch
2. Oberroth
3. Unterroth
