= Nersingen =

- Municipality
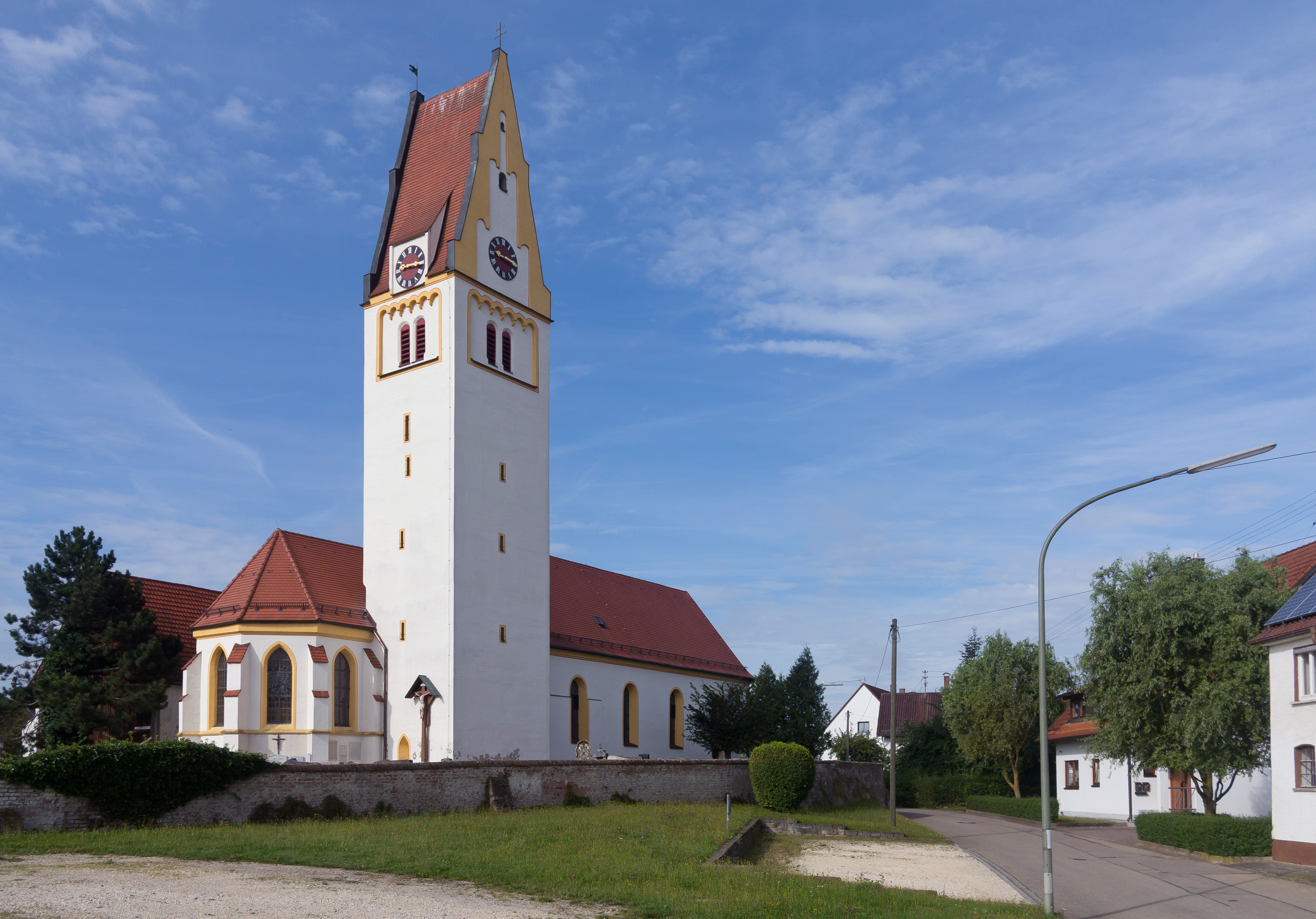
- Church of Saint Dionysius in Oberfahlheim

- Coat of arms

- Location of Nersingen within Neu-Ulm district
- Interactive map of Nersingen
- Location within Germany Location within Bavaria
- Coordinates: 48°25′44″N 10°7′19″E
- Country: Germany
- State: Bavaria
- Admin. region: Schwaben
- District: Neu-Ulm
- Subdivisions: 5 Ortsteile

Government
  - Mayor (2026–32): Fabian Sniatecki

Area
  - Total: 24.27 km^{2} (9.37 sq mi)
- Elevation: 465 m (1,526 ft)

Population (2025-12-31)
  - Total: 9,725
  - Density: 400.7/km^{2} (1,038/sq mi)
- Time zone: UTC+01:00 (CET)
  - Summer (DST): UTC+02:00 (CEST)
- Postal codes: 89278
- Dialling codes: 07308
- Vehicle registration: NU
- Website: www.nersingen.de

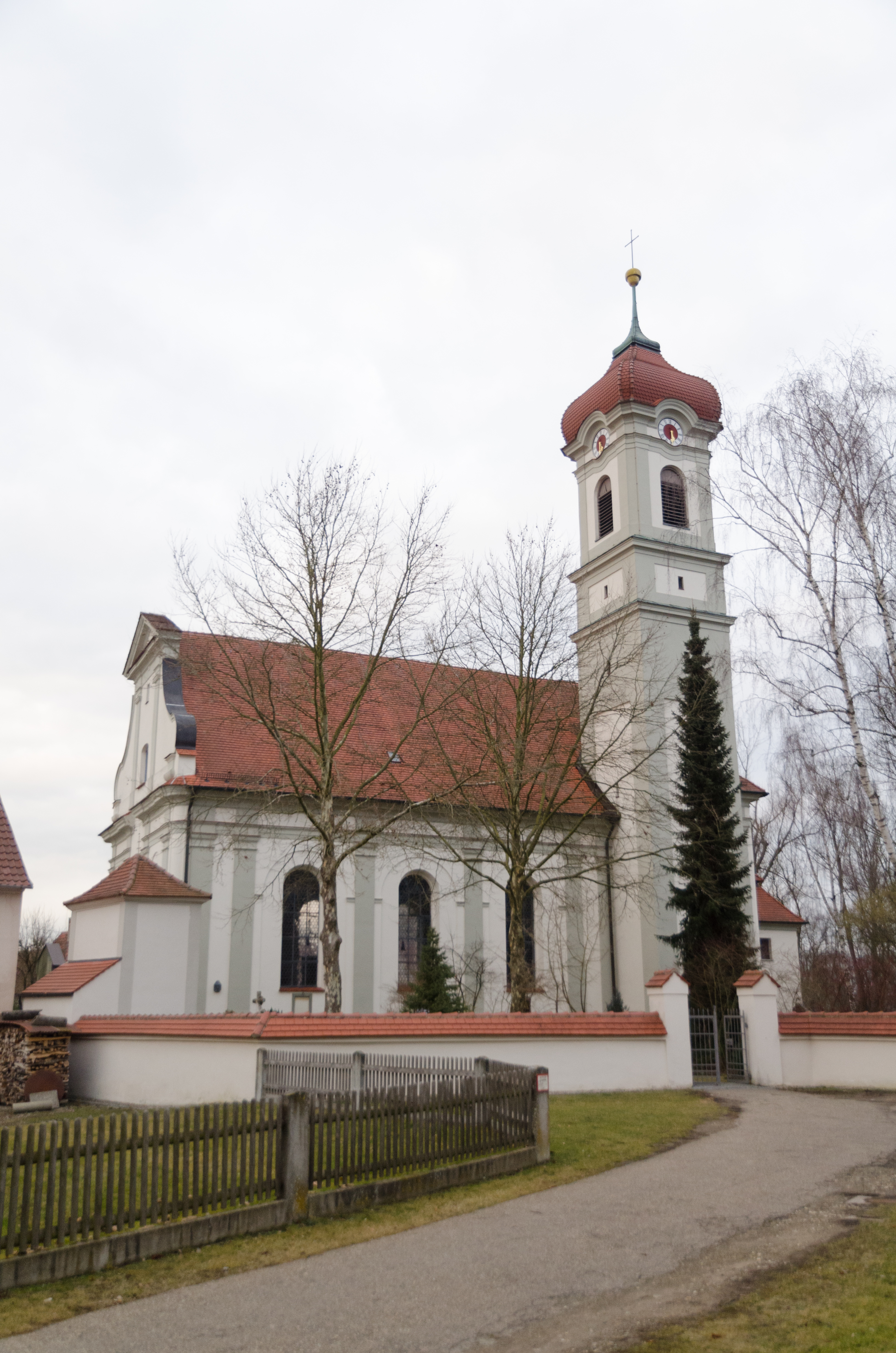
St. John the Baptist Church in Straß

Nersingen is a municipality in the District of Neu-Ulm in Bavaria, Germany. The neighbours are Neu-Ulm, Elchingen, Bibertal and Pfaffenhofen an der Roth.

== Geography ==
=== Geographic location ===
Through the area of Nersingen flow three rivers: The Danube in the north and her both supply rivers, Roth and Leibi, which cross Nersingen from south to north. Also, there are some water ditches and some excavator lakes, which resulted from gravel quarrying. The most part of Nersingen is on the gravellic ground.

=== Municipality arrangement ===
The municipality of Nersingen consists of the principal village of Nersingen and the part villages Straß, Leibi, Unterfahlheim, and Oberfahlheim.

== Economics and infrastructure ==
=== Companies ===
Hilti AG in Straß

=== Traffic ===
Nersingen lies next to the Bundesautobahn 7 and the train line Ulm - Munich. The Bundesstraße 10 passes the municipality parts Unterfahlheim, Oberfahlheim and Nersingen.

=== Education ===
There are two elementary schools and one elementary and principal school.

== Objects of interest ==
- "Bräuhaus Seybold" in Nersingen
- "Museum für bildende Kunst" in Oberfahlheim
- Church "St. Johann Baptist" in Straß
- Church "St. Dionysius" in Oberfahlheim
- Church "St. Nikolaus" in Nersingen
