= Elchingen Abbey =

Coordinates: 48°27′08″N 10°05′17″E

Imperial Abbey of Elchingen Reichsabtei Elchingen
- 1128–1802
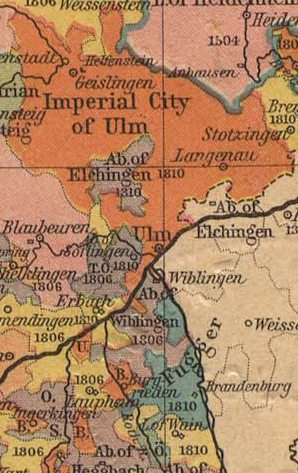
- Map of Württemberg before the French Revolutionary Wars, showing the Free Imperial City of Ulm, separating the two parts of the Imperial Abbey of Elchingen, with the Danube shown running through the centre of the image.
- Status: Imperial Abbey
- Capital: Elchingen
- Common languages: Swabian
- Government: Elective principality
- Historical era: Middle Ages
  - Founded by Counts of Dillingen: 1128
  - Joined Council of Princes: 1793
  - Secularised to Bavaria: 1802
Preceded by	Succeeded by
Duchy of Swabia	Electorate of Bavaria

Elchingen Abbey (German: Kloster Elchingen, Reichsabtei Elchingen) was a Benedictine monastery in Oberelchingen (in Elchingen) in Bavaria, Germany, in the diocese of Augsburg.

For much of its history, Elchingen was one of the 40-odd self-ruling imperial abbeys of the Holy Roman Empire and, as such, was a virtually independent state that contained several villages aside from the monastery itself. At the time of its secularisation in 1802, the abbey covered 112 square kilometers and had 4000-4200 subjects.

== History ==
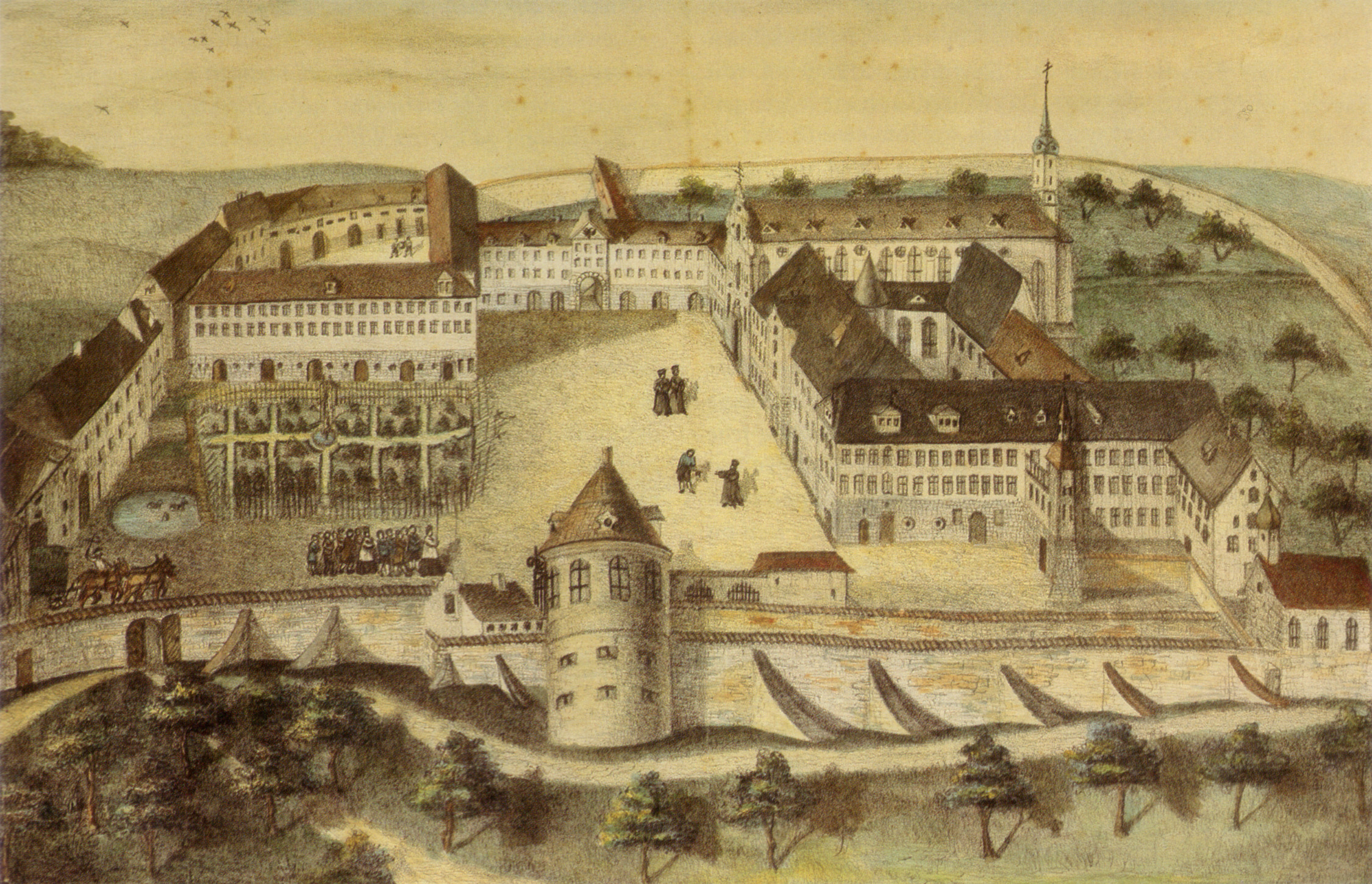
Elchingen Abbey, 18th century

Dedicated to the Virgin Mary and Saints Peter and Paul, the monastery was founded by the Counts of Dillingen. The abbey was one of the very few that enjoyed Imperial immediacy (independent of the jurisdiction of any lord and answering directly to the Holy Roman Emperor, and thus a territorial principality in its own right). The abbot sat in the Reichstag of the Holy Roman Empire.

Like all the other imperial abbeys, Elchingen lost its independence in the course of the secularisation process in 1802-1803 and the monastery was dissolved. By 1840 the buildings had been almost entirely demolished.

On October 17, 1805 (25 Vendémiaire, Year 14), at 2 o'clock in the afternoon, Napoleon wrote from the Abbey of Elchingen to Prince Murat: " ... It seems to me that you should have slept where the 9th light is, so as to be able, at daybreak, to follow the enemy and outrun him"

In 1921 the Missionary Oblates of Mary Immaculate settled on the site.

== Bibliography ==
- Brenner, Bernhard, 2003. Das ehemalige Reichsstift Elchingen/Oberelchingen. In: Klosterland Bayerisch Schwaben Werner Schiedermair (ed.), pp216–219. Lindenberg Fink. ISBN 3-89870-127-1.
- Correspondance de Napoléon, t.11, letters 9386; Correspondance générale de Napoléon, t.5, letter 11007.
- Dirr, Albert, 1926. Die Reichsabtei Elchingen von der Mitte des 15. bis zur Mitte des 16. Jahrhunderts. Augsburg (also dissertation, Ludwig-Maximilians-Universität München 1925)
- Konrad, Anton H., 1965. Die Reichsabtei Elchingen. Ihr Bild im Wandel der Jahrhunderte. Weissenhorn: Konrad.
- Kramer, Ferdinand Kramer, 1991. "Wissenschaft und Streben nach 'Wahrer Aufklärung'. Ein Beitrag zur Aufklärung im ostschwäbischen Benediktinerkloster Elchingen", in: Zeitschrift für bayerische Landesgeschichte, 54 / 1991, 1:269-286 (ISSN 0044-2364)
