= Neu-Ulm (district) =

Coordinates: 48°20′N 10°10′E

- District
- Flag Coat of arms
- Country: Germany
- State: Bavaria
- Adm. region: Swabia
- Capital: Neu-Ulm

Government
  - District admin.: Thorsten Freudenberger (CSU)

Area
  - Total: 515 km^{2} (199 sq mi)

Population (31 December 2025)
  - Total: 183,829
  - Density: 357/km^{2} (924/sq mi)
- Time zone: UTC+01:00 (CET)
  - Summer (DST): UTC+02:00 (CEST)
- Vehicle registration: ILL, NU
- Website: landkreis.neu-ulm.de

Neu-Ulm is a Landkreis (district) in Swabia, Bavaria, Germany. It is bounded by (from the east and clockwise) the districts of Günzburg and Unterallgäu and the state of Baden-Württemberg (districts Biberach and Alb-Donau, city of Ulm).

The district was established in 1972 by merging the former districts of Neu-Ulm and Illertissen with the previously district-free city of Neu-Ulm.

The district includes the eastern metropolitan area of the city of Ulm. The Danube and its tributary, the Iller, form the western border of the district.

== Coat of arms ==
The coat of arms displays:

- the moor from the arms of Kirchberg
- the horn from the arms of Neuffen

== Towns and municipalities ==
Clickable map of towns and municipalities in the district

Towns
1. Illertissen
2. Neu-Ulm
3. Senden
4. Vöhringen
5. Weißenhorn
Municipalities
1. Bellenberg
2. Elchingen
3. Nersingen
4. Roggenburg

Verwaltungsgemeinschaften
1. Altenstadt; 1. Altenstadt^{1,2}; 2. Kellmünz^{2}; 3. Osterberg	2. Buch; 1. Buch^{1,2}; 2. Oberroth; 3. Unterroth	3. Pfaffenhofen an der Roth; 1. Holzheim; 2. Pfaffenhofen an der Roth^{1,2}
^{1}seat of the Verwaltungsgemeinschaft; ^{2}Markt
