= Oberroth =

- Municipality
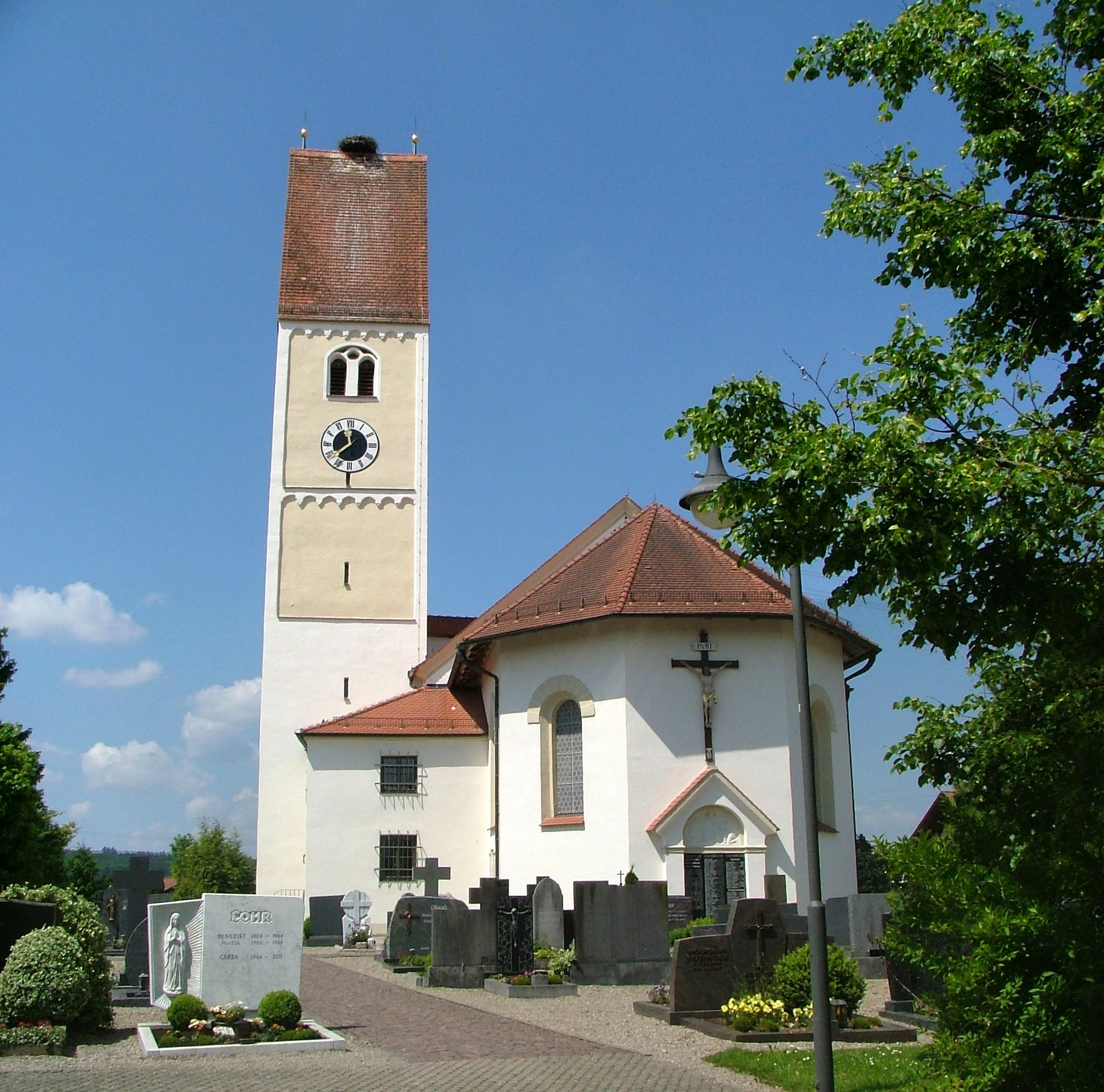
- Church of Saint Stephen

- Coat of arms

- Location of Oberroth within Neu-Ulm district
- Interactive map of Oberroth
- Location within Germany Location within Bavaria
- Coordinates: 48°10′N 10°11′E
- Country: Germany
- State: Bavaria
- Admin. region: Schwaben
- District: Neu-Ulm
- Municipal assoc.: Buch

Government
  - Mayor (2020–26): Willibold Graf

Area
  - Total: 9.95 km^{2} (3.84 sq mi)
- Elevation: 534 m (1,752 ft)

Population (2025-12-31)
  - Total: 1,000
  - Density: 100/km^{2} (260/sq mi)
- Time zone: UTC+01:00 (CET)
  - Summer (DST): UTC+02:00 (CEST)
- Postal codes: 89294
- Dialling codes: 08333
- Vehicle registration: NU
- Website: www.oberroth.de

Oberroth is a municipality in the district of Neu-Ulm in Bavaria in Germany.
