= Katrin Albsteiger =

German politician

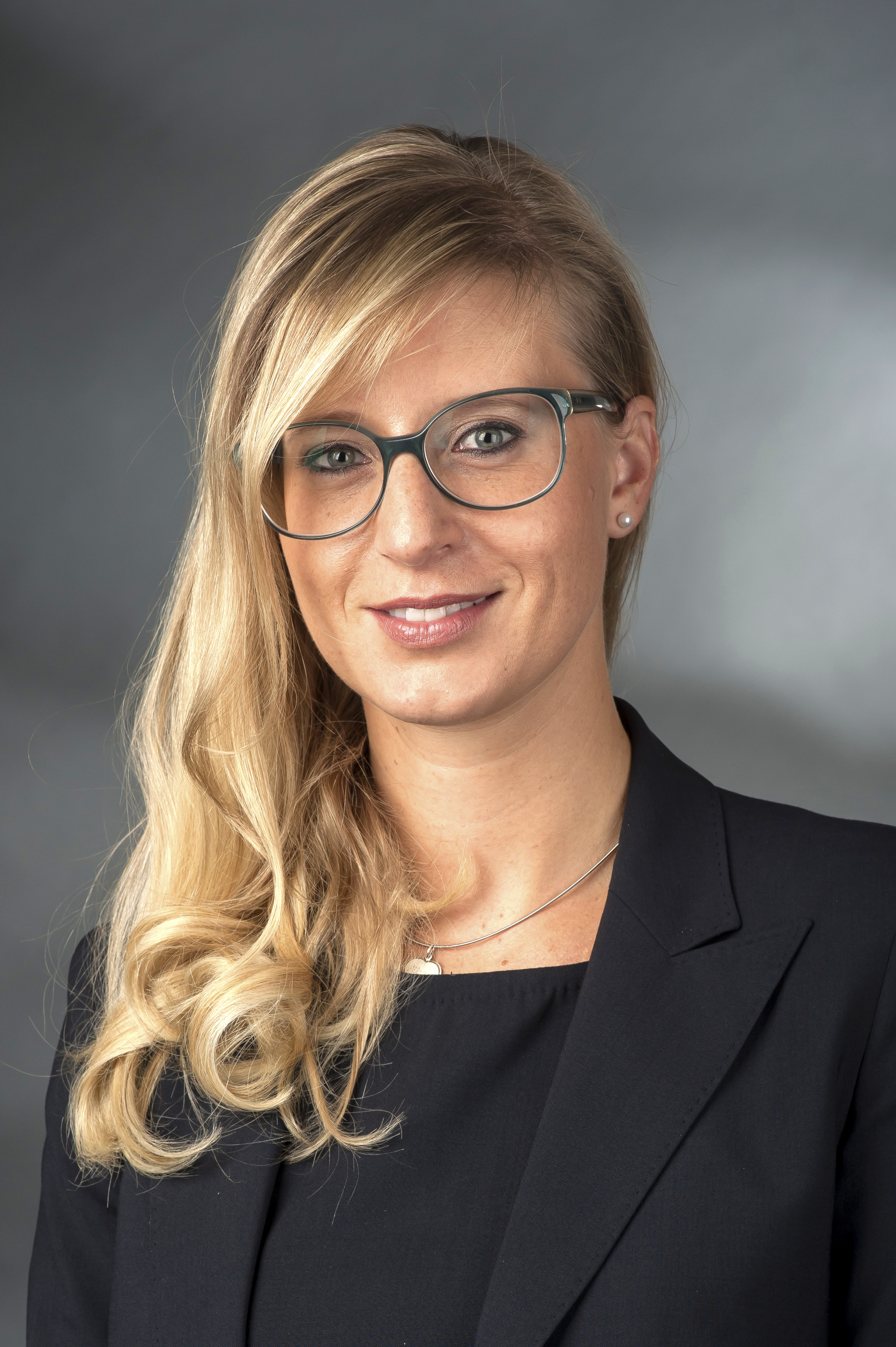

Member of the Bundestag
- In office 2013–2017

Personal details
- Born: Katrin Poleschner; 20 November 1983 (age 42) Elchingen, Bavaria, Germany
- Party: Christian Social Union of Bavaria
- Spouse: Tobias Albsteiger
- Occupation: Politician
- Website: http://www.katrin-albsteiger.de/

Katrin Albsteiger (née Poleschner, born 20 November 1983) is a German politician from the Christian Social Union of Bavaria.

== Education and early career ==
Albsteiger studied political science at the University of Augsburg and the University of Adelaide between 2003 and 2008.

Following her graduation, Albsteiger worked at the CSU headquarters in Munich from 2009 until 2010, before moving on to a corporate communications role at German energy company E.ON. Between 2011 and 2013, she worked as a spokesperson for the Stadtwerke Ulm/Neu-Ulm utility company (SWU).

== Political career ==
Between the 2013 and the 2017 federal elections, Albsteiger served as member of the German Bundestag representing Bavaria.

In parliament, Albsteiger served on the Committee on European Affairs and on the Committee on Education, Research and Technology Assessment. She was her parliamentary group's rapporteur on youth unemployment and gender equality as well as on Greece, Cyprus and Austria.

In June 2017, Albsteiger voted against the introduction of same-sex marriage in Germany.

Since 2021, Albsteiger has been serving as one of five deputy chairs of the CSU, under the leadership of chairman Markus Söder.

Albsteiger was nominated by her party as delegate to the Federal Convention for the purpose of electing the President of Germany in 2022.

== Other activities ==
- Federal Agency for Civic Education (BPB), Deputy Member of the Board of Trustees (2014–2017)
- Institute for European Politics, Member of the Board of Trustees
