= Elchingen =

Settlement in Germany

- Municipality
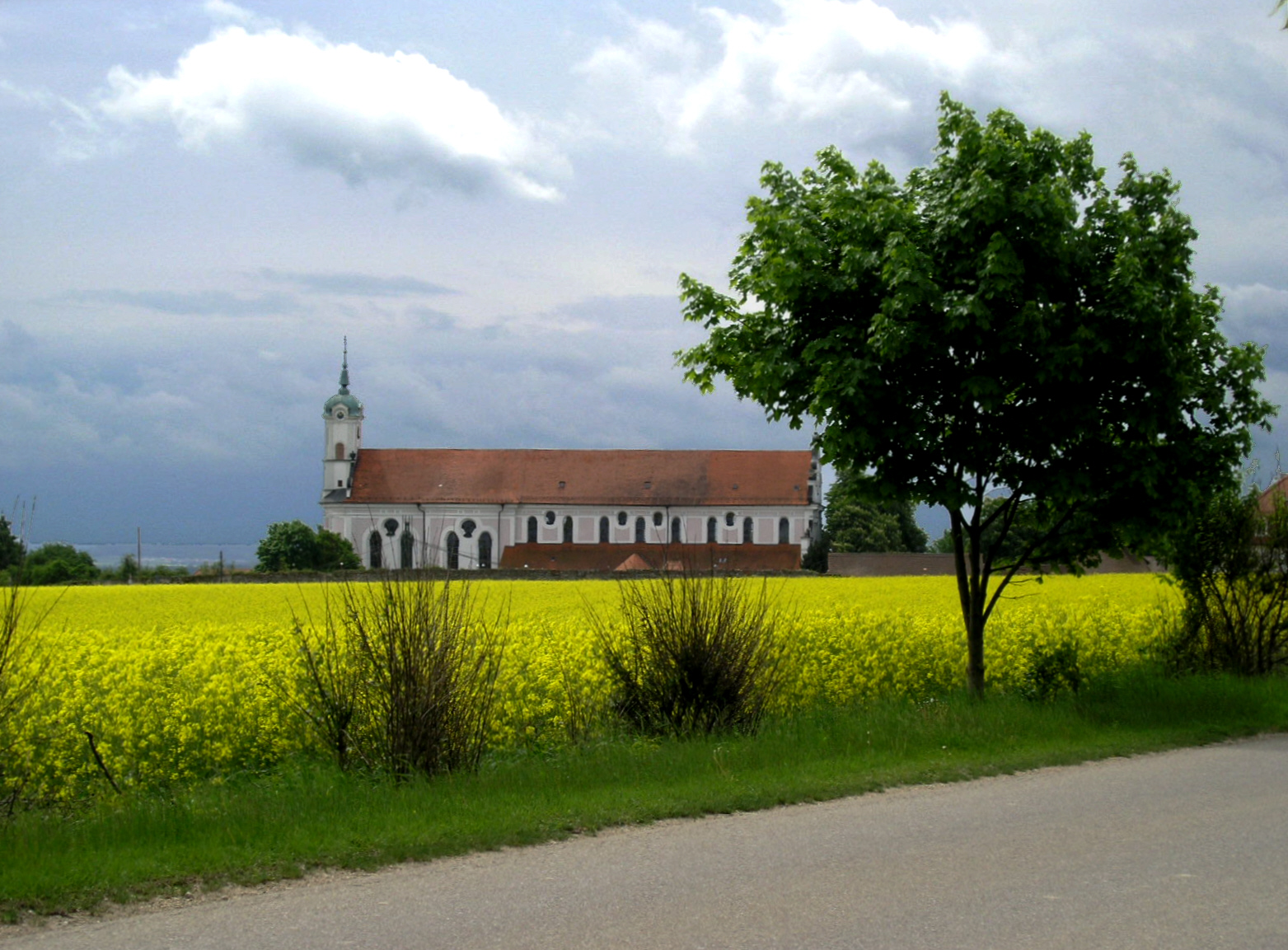
- Elchingen Monastery

- Location of Elchingen within Neu-Ulm district
- Interactive map of Elchingen
- Location within Germany Location within Bavaria
- Coordinates: 48°27′06″N 10°05′52″E
- Country: Germany
- State: Bavaria
- Admin. region: Schwaben
- District: Neu-Ulm
- Subdivisions: 3 Ortsteile

Government
  - Mayor (2020–26): Joachim Eisenkolb (Ind.)

Area
  - Total: 24.89 km^{2} (9.61 sq mi)
- Elevation: 465 m (1,526 ft)

Population (2025-12-31)
  - Total: 9,768
  - Density: 392.4/km^{2} (1,016/sq mi)
- Time zone: UTC+01:00 (CET)
  - Summer (DST): UTC+02:00 (CEST)
- Postal codes: 89275
- Dialling codes: 0731, 07308
- Vehicle registration: NU, ILL
- Website: elchingen.de

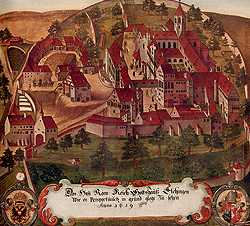
Elchingen in 1619

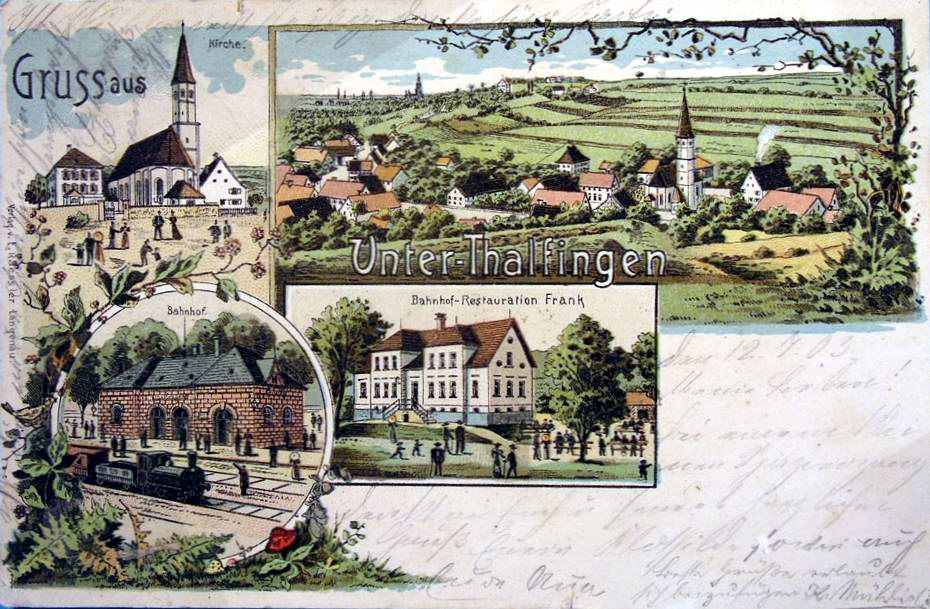
Unter-Thalfingen in 1903

Elchingen (German pronunciation: [ˈɛlçɪŋən]) is a municipality about 7 km east of Ulm–Neu-Ulm in the district of Neu-Ulm in Bavaria, Germany.

Municipality parts:

- Thalfingen: 4 211 residents, 8.83 km²
- Oberelchingen: 3 024 residents, 7.31 km²
- Unterelchingen: 2 863 residents, 8.76 km²

== History ==
In 1294, Elchingen (today: Unterelchingen) was sold by Konrad of Plochingen to the Cistercian monastery of Salem. Unterelchingen stayed in its property until the secularization in 1802. Unterelchingen never was in possession of the Monastery of Elchingen. In 1803, Ober-, Unter-elchingen and Thalfingen became Bavarian, due to the Principal Decree of the Imperial Deputation.

The Benedictine monastery of Elchingen was founded at the beginning of the 12th century. In 1395 all authentic documents were destroyed in a fire. So the probable consecration date (15 August 1128) cannot be proven.

Around 1500, the German Conquistador Ambrosius Ehinger was born there. He later went on to be a pivotal figure in the colony of Klein-Venedig in modern-day Venezuela. He was killed in 1533 by native tribes while searching for the mythical El Dorado.

Elchingen became famous through the Battle of Elchingen: on 14 October 1805 the Napoleonic troops under the command of Marshal Michel Ney defeated the Austrians. One day later the Battle of Ulm began, after which Karl Mack von Leiberich finally had to capitulate. In 1806 Napoleon conferred the title of Duc d'Elchingen on Marshal Ney and the name of Elchingen was engraved on the Arc de Triomphe in Paris.

For the region the Napoleonic victory meant the end of the Austrian supremacy which led to a re-organization of the area of Württemberg and Bavaria.

Today's municipality of Elchingen is the result of the reorganization of Bavaria on 1 May 1978 through the integration of Thalfingen, Oberelchingen and Unterelchingen.

== Mayor ==
- 1984-2008: Anton Lang (died 2008)
- November 2008: Joachim Eisenkolb was elected the mayor

As of 2020 Joachim Eisenkolb is the mayor of Elchingen.

== Economics ==
=== Traffic ===
Elchingen lies on the A8 autobahn, which connects Stuttgart and Munich, near the intersection where the A8 crosses the A7, and has its own exit.

Elchingen also lies on the train line between Ulm and Aalen, the so-called Brenzbahn.

=== Attractions ===
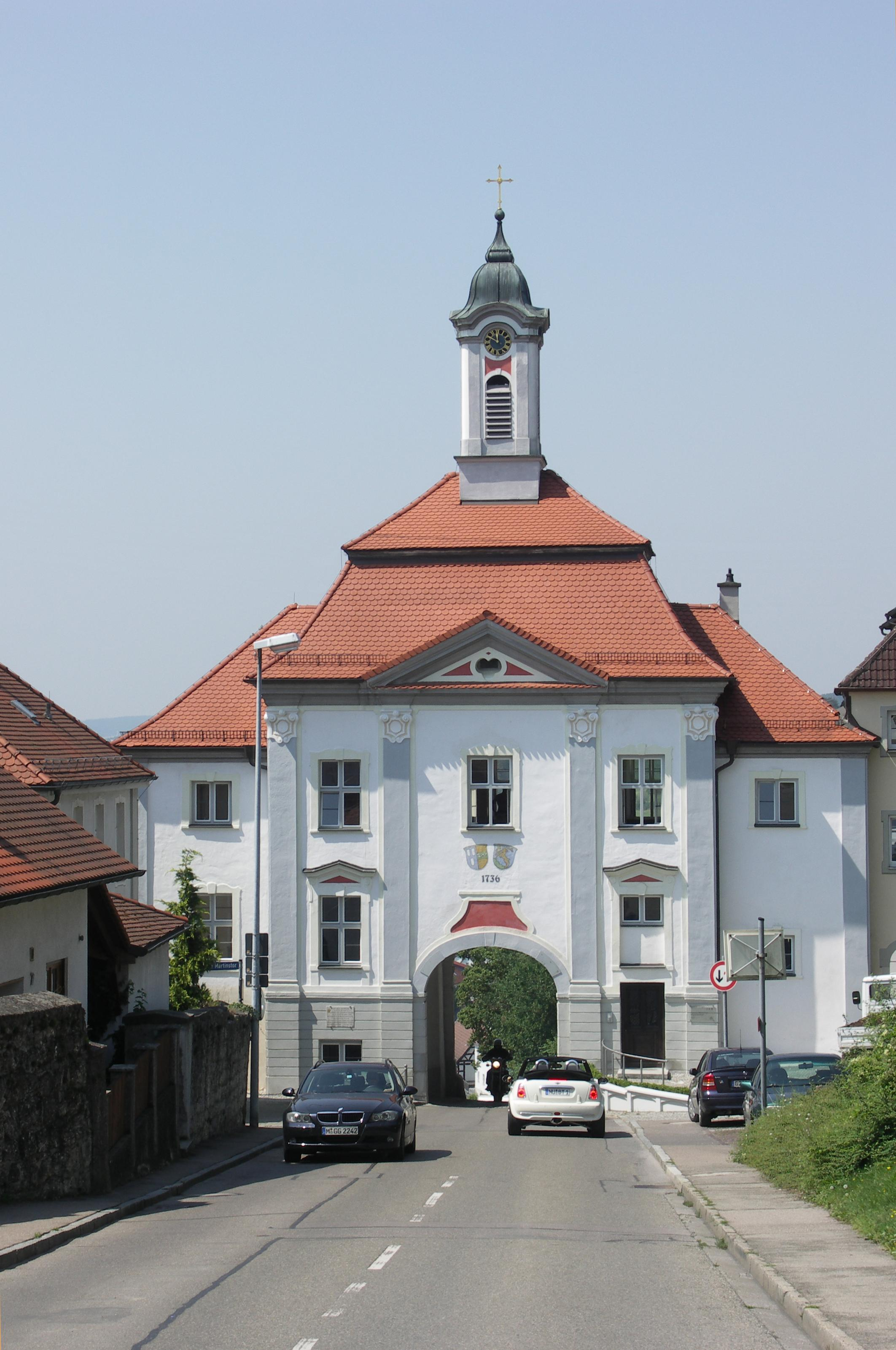
Martinstor Oberelchingen

- The Catholic Church St. Laurentius in the center of Thalfingen.
- North of Thalfingen is the truck stop Seligweiler.
- The monastery Oberelchingen with the former abbey church St. Peter and Paul.

=== Sport ===
In the hamlet of Thalfingen is a multi-purpose hall, which was completely renovated in 2005.

=== Regular events ===
The Protestant church organizes an annual community festival in Thalfingen. The traditional, well-known in the region "Narrabaumstella", a Swabian-Alemannic carnival custom takes place every year in Oberelchingen and attracts hundreds of participants in the streets of Oberelchingen.

=== Sons and daughters of the town ===
- Ambrosius Ehinger (born before 1500-1533) German conquistador and the first governor of Venezuela
- Konstantin Vidal (1900-1990), German politician (CSU), 1946-1950 member of the Bavarian Parliament
- Martin Grath (born 1960 in Thalfingen) Member of Landtag
- Katrin Albsteiger, (born 1983), CSU politician

== Literature ==
- Franz Willbold: Napoleons Feldzug um Ulm. Die Schlacht von Elchingen 1805 ISBN 3-7995-8027-1
- Alfred Krauss: 1805 – Der Feldzug von Ulm. Vienna 1912 (Maps from this at napoleon-online.de: Battle near Elchingen und Situation at the evening of 14 October)
