= Unterroth =

- Municipality
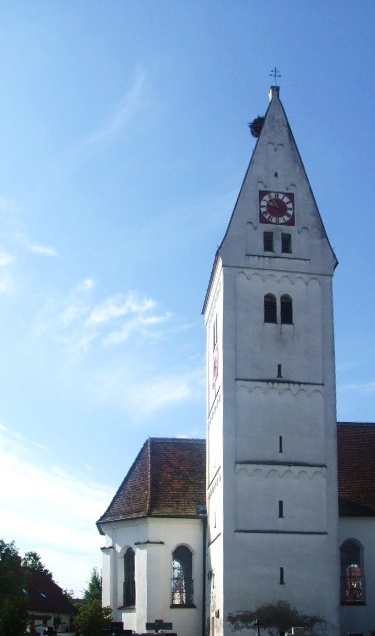
- Church of Saints Gordianus and Epimachus

- Coat of arms

- Location of Unterroth within Neu-Ulm district
- Interactive map of Unterroth
- Location within Germany Location within Bavaria
- Coordinates: 48°12′N 10°10′E
- Country: Germany
- State: Bavaria
- Admin. region: Schwaben
- District: Neu-Ulm
- Municipal assoc.: Buch

Government
  - Mayor (2020–26): Norbert Poppele

Area
  - Total: 15.37 km^{2} (5.93 sq mi)
- Elevation: 524 m (1,719 ft)

Population (2025-12-31)
  - Total: 1,069
  - Density: 69.55/km^{2} (180.1/sq mi)
- Time zone: UTC+01:00 (CET)
  - Summer (DST): UTC+02:00 (CEST)
- Postal codes: 89299
- Dialling codes: 07343
- Vehicle registration: NU
- Website: www.vg-buch.de

Unterroth is a municipality in the district of Neu-Ulm in the administrative region of Swabia (Schwaben), Bavaria, Germany. It is part of the Danube-Iller region in southern Bavaria.
