= Bibertal =

- Municipality
- Coat of arms

- Location of Bibertal within Günzburg district
- Interactive map of Bibertal
- Location within Germany Location within Bavaria
- Coordinates: 48°24′N 10°12′E
- Country: Germany
- State: Bavaria
- Admin. region: Schwaben
- District: Günzburg

Government
  - Mayor (2020–26): Roman Gepperth

Area
  - Total: 27.3 km^{2} (10.5 sq mi)
- Elevation: 495 m (1,624 ft)

Population (2025-12-31)
  - Total: 4,908
  - Density: 180/km^{2} (466/sq mi)
- Time zone: UTC+01:00 (CET)
  - Summer (DST): UTC+02:00 (CEST)
- Postal codes: 89346
- Dialling codes: 08226
- Vehicle registration: GZ
- Website: www.bibertal.de

Bibertal (German pronunciation: [ˈbiːbɐtaːl]) is a municipality in the district of Günzburg in Bavaria in Germany.
