= Holzheim, Neu-Ulm =

Holzheim
- Municipality
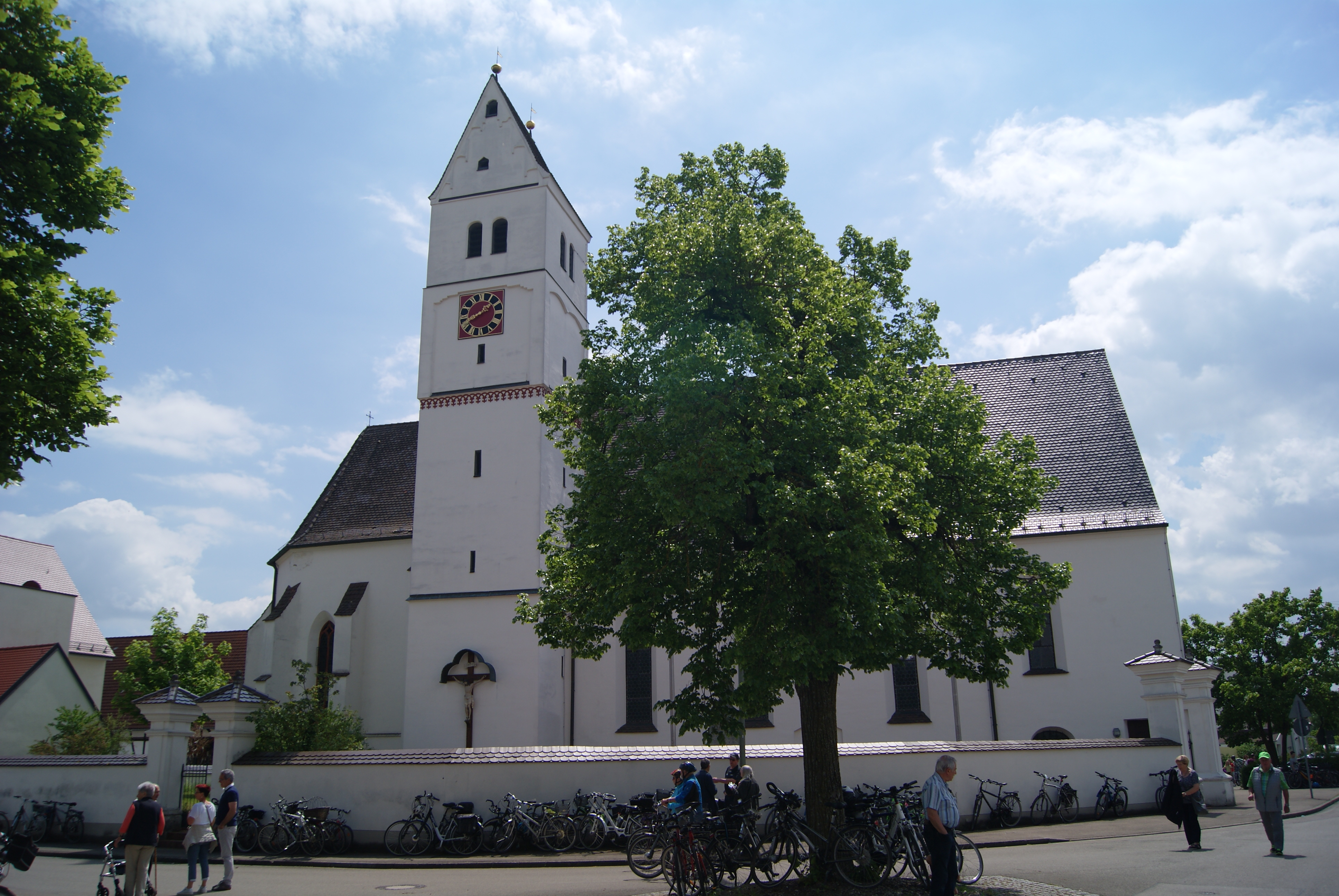
- Saint Peter and Paul Church

- Coat of arms

- Location of Holzheim within Neu-Ulm district
- Interactive map of Holzheim
- Location within Germany Location within Bavaria
- Coordinates: 48°23′N 10°6′E
- Country: Germany
- State: Bavaria
- Admin. region: Schwaben
- District: Neu-Ulm
- Municipal assoc.: Pfaffenhofen an der Roth

Government
  - Mayor (2020–26): Thomas Hartmann

Area
  - Total: 7.6 km^{2} (2.9 sq mi)
- Elevation: 475 m (1,558 ft)

Population (2025-12-31)
  - Total: 1,973
  - Density: 260/km^{2} (670/sq mi)
- Time zone: UTC+01:00 (CET)
  - Summer (DST): UTC+02:00 (CEST)
- Postal codes: 89291
- Dialling codes: 07302
- Vehicle registration: NU
- Website: www.holzheim-nu.de

Holzheim (German pronunciation: [ˈhɔltshaɪm]) is a municipality in the district of Neu-Ulm in Bavaria in Germany.
