= List of castles in Bavaria =

Historical Castles

Neuschwanstein, Bavaria's most famous castle

Numerous castles are found in the German state of Bavaria. These buildings, some of which have a history of over 1,000 years, were the setting for historical events, domains of famous personalities, and are still imposing structures to this day.

This list encompasses castles described in German as Burg (castle), Festung (fort/fortress), Schloss (manor house) and Palais/Palast (palace). Many German castles after the Middle Ages were built mainly as royal or noble residences rather than as fortified buildings.

== Regierungsbezirk Oberbayern ==
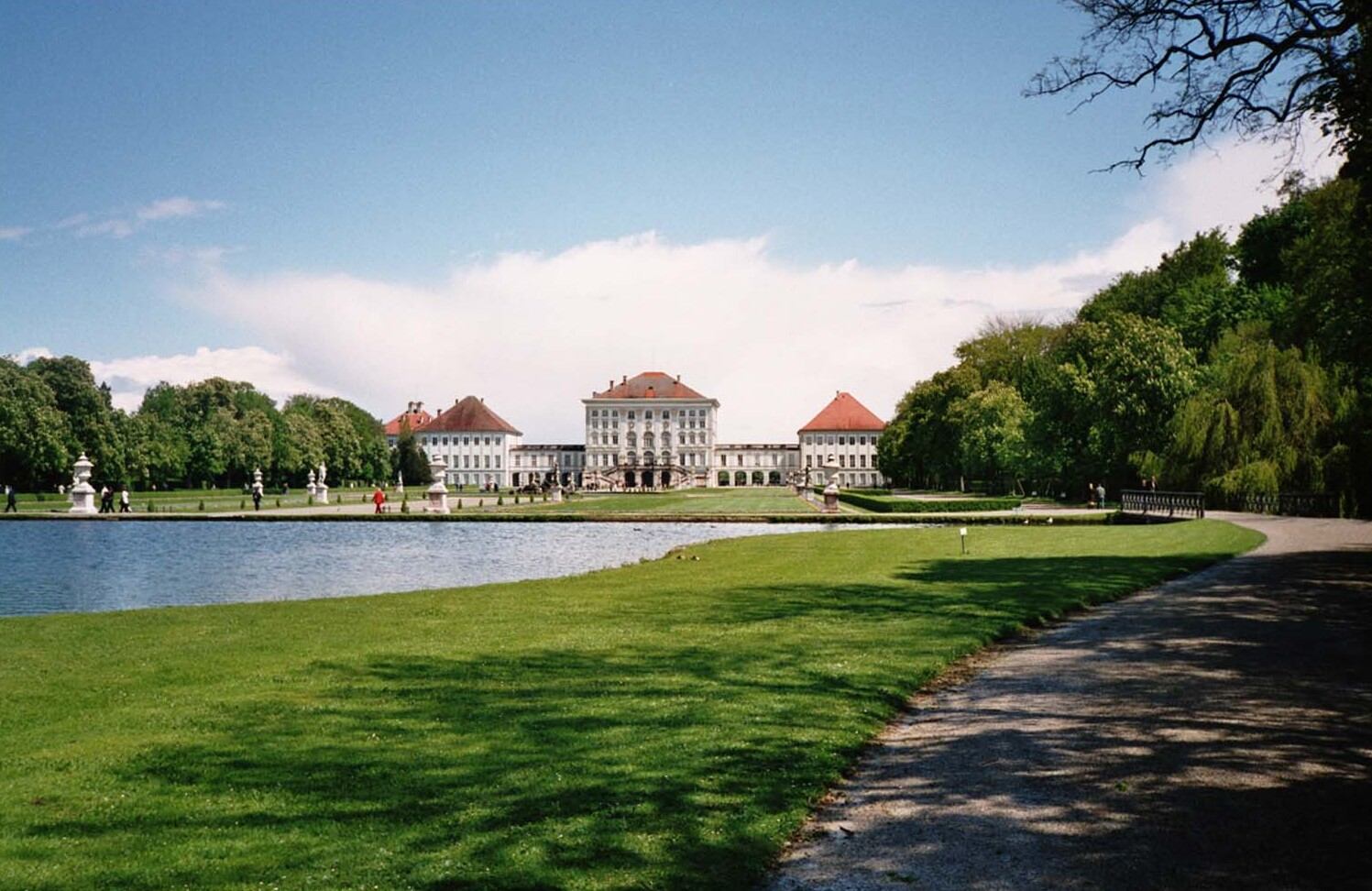
Schloss Nymphenburg

=== Altötting ===
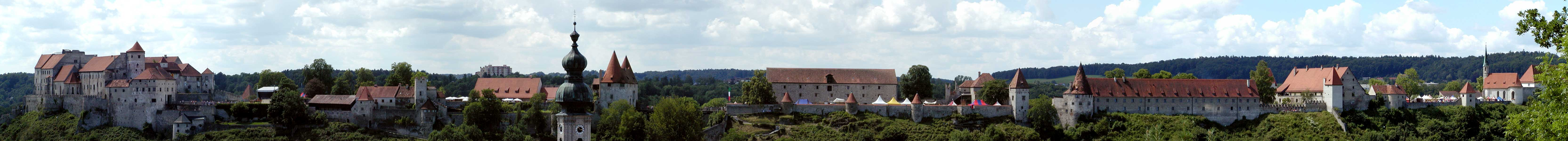
Burghausen, Panoramic view of the castle (view from east)

1. Burghausen Castle (in German)
2. Castle Tuessling (in German)

=== Bad Tölz-Wolfratshausen ===
1. Seeburg (Münsing)
2. Schloss Hohenburg
3. Hohenburg (Lenggries) (ruin)

=== Berchtesgadener Land ===
1. Berchtesgaden Castle (de)
2. Gruttenstein Castle (de)
3. Burgruine Karlstein (de)
4. Castle Laufen
5. Marzoll Palace (de)
6. Raschenberg Castle (de)
7. Staufeneck Castle (de)

=== Bernried ===
1. Schloss Höhenried

=== Dachau ===
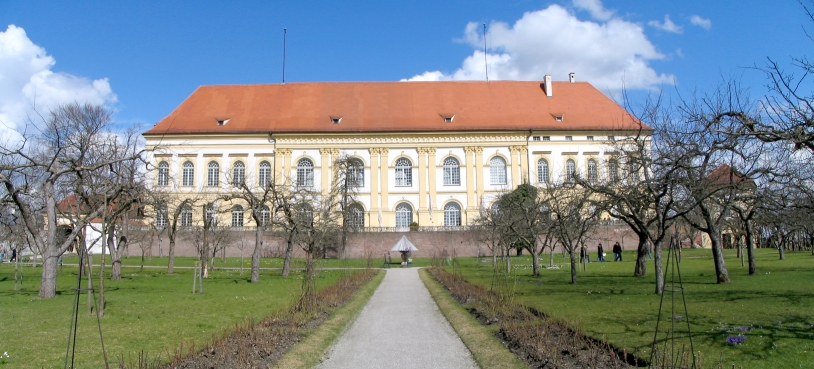
Dachau Palace

1. Dachau Palace
2. Schloss Haimhausen
3. Unterweikertshofen Castle (in German)
4. Schloss Lauterbach

=== Ebersberg ===
1. Burg Unterelkofen, Grafing b. München

=== Eichstätt ===
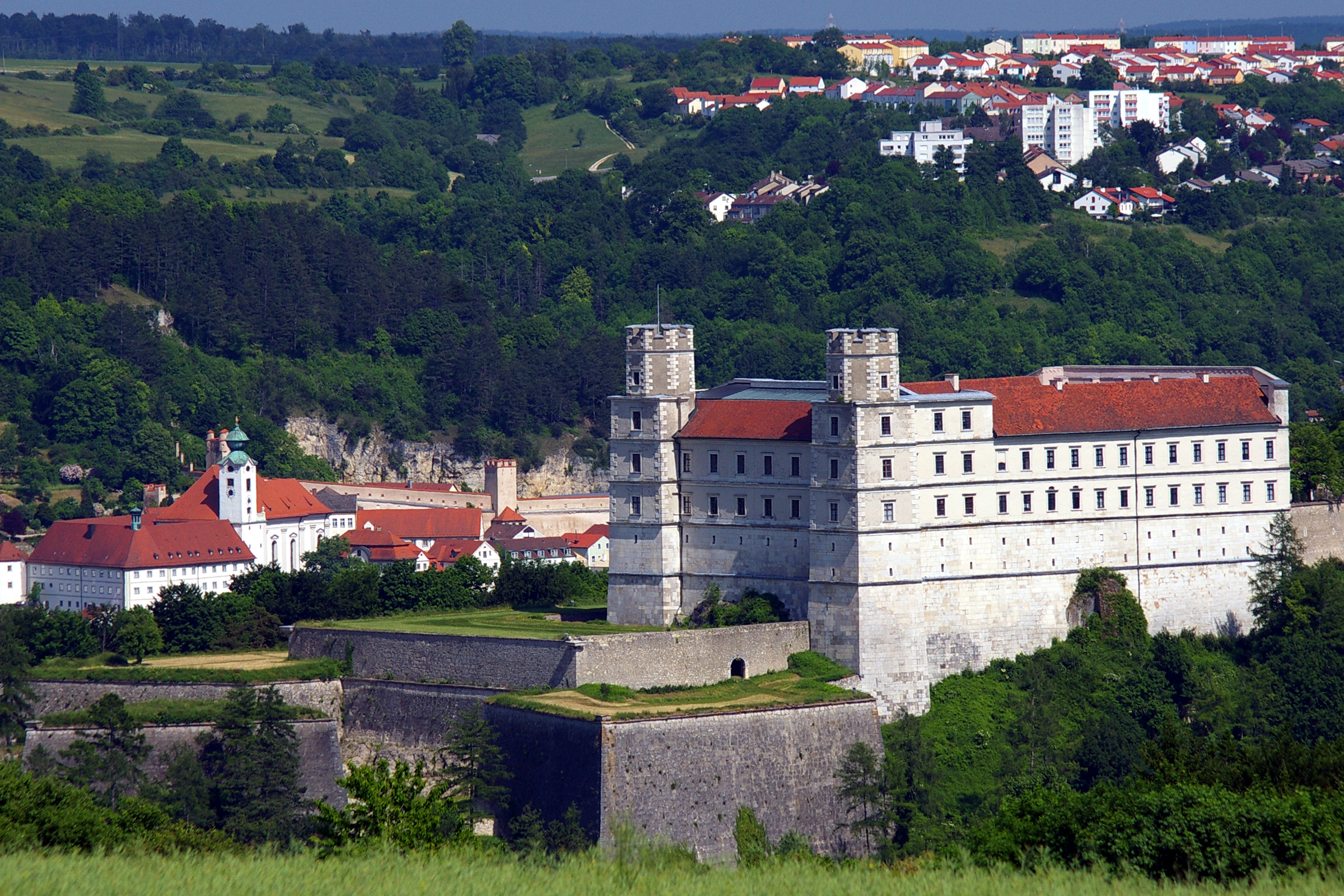
Willibaldsburg, Eichstätt

1. Altmannstein Castle, Altmannstein
2. Arnsberg Castle, Kipfenberg
3. Brunneck Castle, Titting
4. Dollnstein Castle, Dollnstein
5. Residenz Eichstätt, Eichstätt
6. Sommerresidenz Eichstätt, Eichstätt
7. Schloss Hepberg, Hepberg
8. Schloss Hexenagger, Altmannstein
9. Schloss Hirschberg, Beilngries
10. Kirchenburg Kinding, Kinding
11. Kipfenberg Castle, Kipfenberg
12. Schloss Lenting, Lenting
13. Mörnsheim Castle, Mörnsheim
14. Nassenfels Castle, Nassenfels
15. Schloss Oberdolling, Oberdolling
16. Pfalzpaint Castle, Walting
17. Schloss Pfünz, Walting
18. Rieshofen Castle, Walting
19. Rumburg Castle, Kinding
20. Rundeck Castle, Kinding
21. Schloss Sandersdorf, Altmannstein
22. Schloss Schönbrunn, Denkendorf
23. Schloss Titting, Titting
24. Wellheim Castle, Wellheim
25. Willibaldsburg, Eichstätt

=== Erding ===
1. Schloss Burgrein, Isen

=== Garmisch-Partenkirchen ===
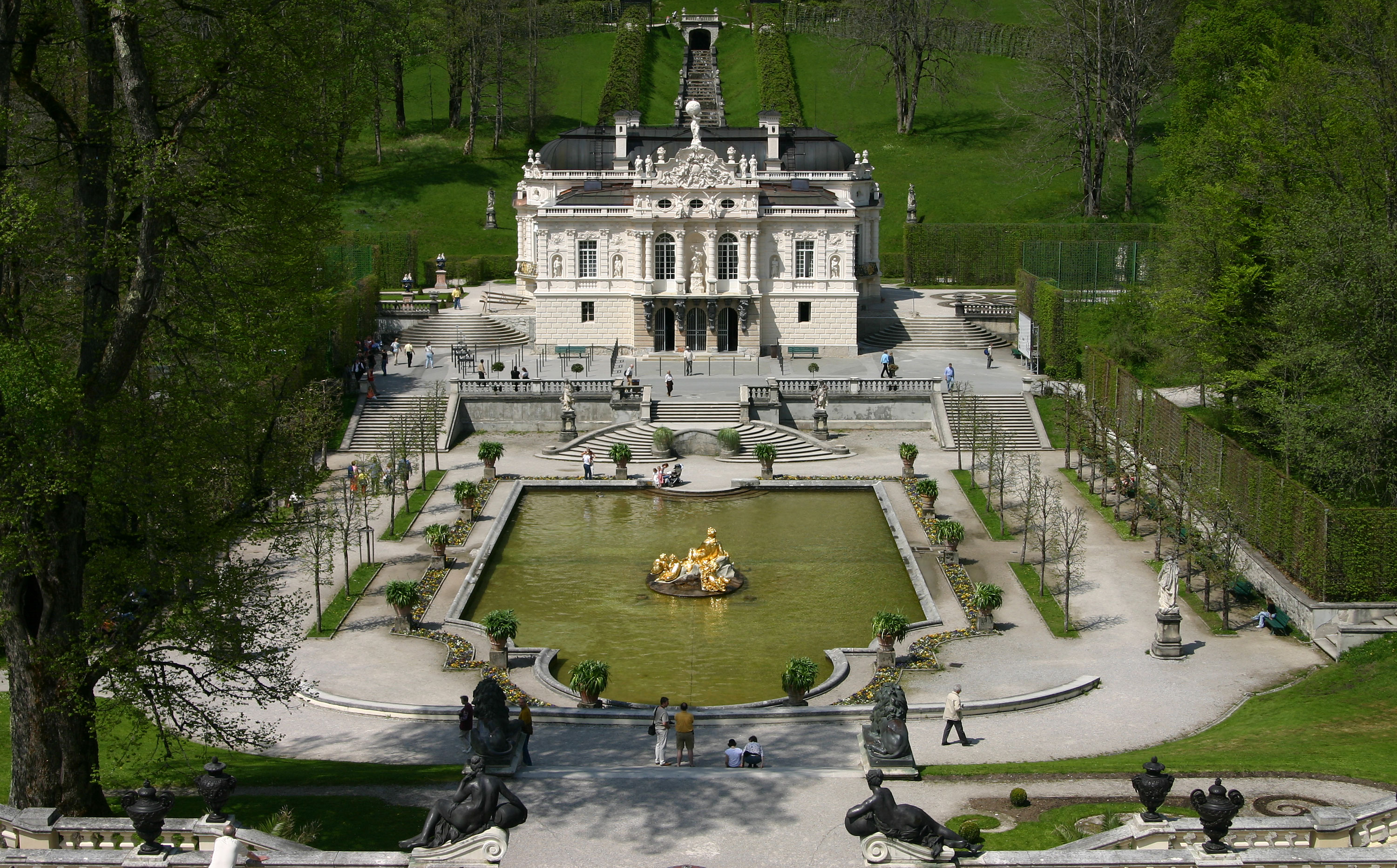
Linderhof Palace

1. Königshaus am Schachen
2. Schloss Linderhof, Ettal
3. Werdenfels Castle, Garmisch-Partenkirchen

=== Ingolstadt ===
1. Neues Schloss Ingolstadt (in German)

=== Landsberg ===
1. Damasia, Dießen am Ammersee
2. Phetine, Landsberg am Lech
3. Schloss Igling, Igling

=== Mühldorf ===
1. Schloss Jettenbach, Jettenbach
2. Schloss Klebing, Pleiskirchen

=== Munich ===
1. Alter Hof
2. Amalienburg
3. Blutenburg
4. Nymphenburg
5. Residenz
6. Fürstenried

=== Munich (district) ===
1. Grünwald Castle, Grünwald
2. Schleissheim Palace, Oberschleißheim

=== Neuburg-Schrobenhausen ===
1. Alte Burg, Oberhausen
2. Schloss Bertoldsheim, Rennertshofen
3. Grünau Hunting Lodge, Neuburg an der Donau
4. Hütting Castle, Rennertshofen
5. Schloss Neuburg, Neuburg an der Donau
6. Sandizell Castle, Schrobenhausen
7. Schloss Stepperg, Rennertshofen

=== Pfaffenhofen ===
1. Schloss Jetzendorf, Jetzendorf
2. Schloss Reichertshausen, Reichertshausen
3. Schloss Rohrbach, Rohrbach (Oberbayern)
4. Scheyern Castle, Scheyern
5. Vohburg Castle, Vohburg an der Donau

=== Rosenheim ===
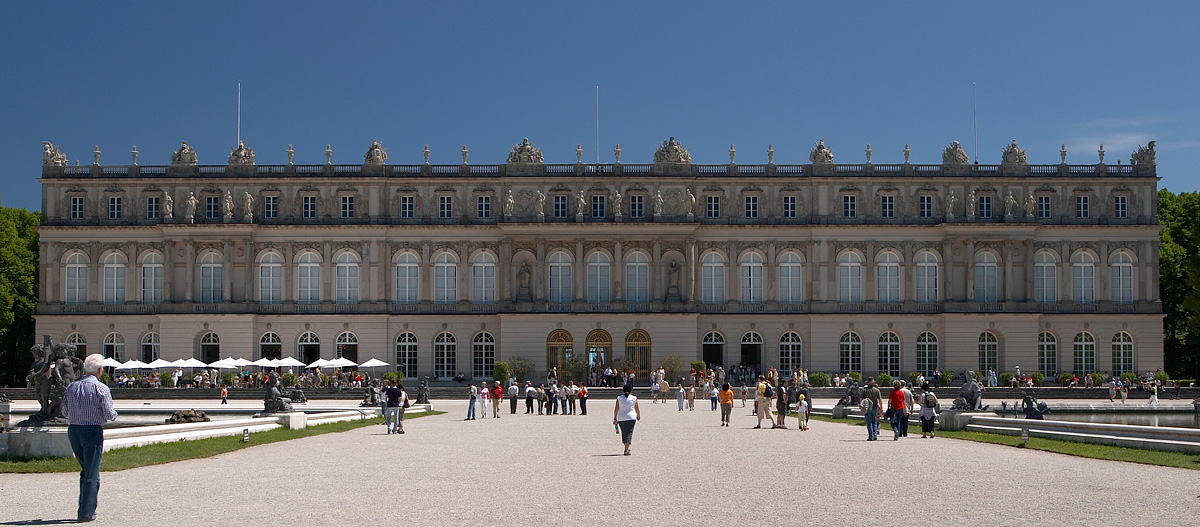
Schloss Herrenchiemsee

1. Schloss Herrenchiemsee, Chiemsee
2. Wasserburg Castle, Wasserburg am Inn
3. Hofberg, Bad Aibling
4. Schloss Amerang, Amerang
5. Schloss Maxlrain, Maxlrain
6. Schloss Altenburg, Altenburg
7. Schloss Vagen, Vagen

=== Starnberg ===
1. Schloss Allmannshausen, Berg
2. Schloss Berg, Berg
3. Schloss Kempfenhausen, Berg

=== Traunstein ===
1. Stein Castle, Stein an der Traun
2. Tittmoning Castle, Tittmoning

== Regierungsbezirk Niederbayern ==
=== Landshut ===
1. Trausnitz Castle
2. Landshut Residence
3. Burgruine Wolfstein

=== Passau ===
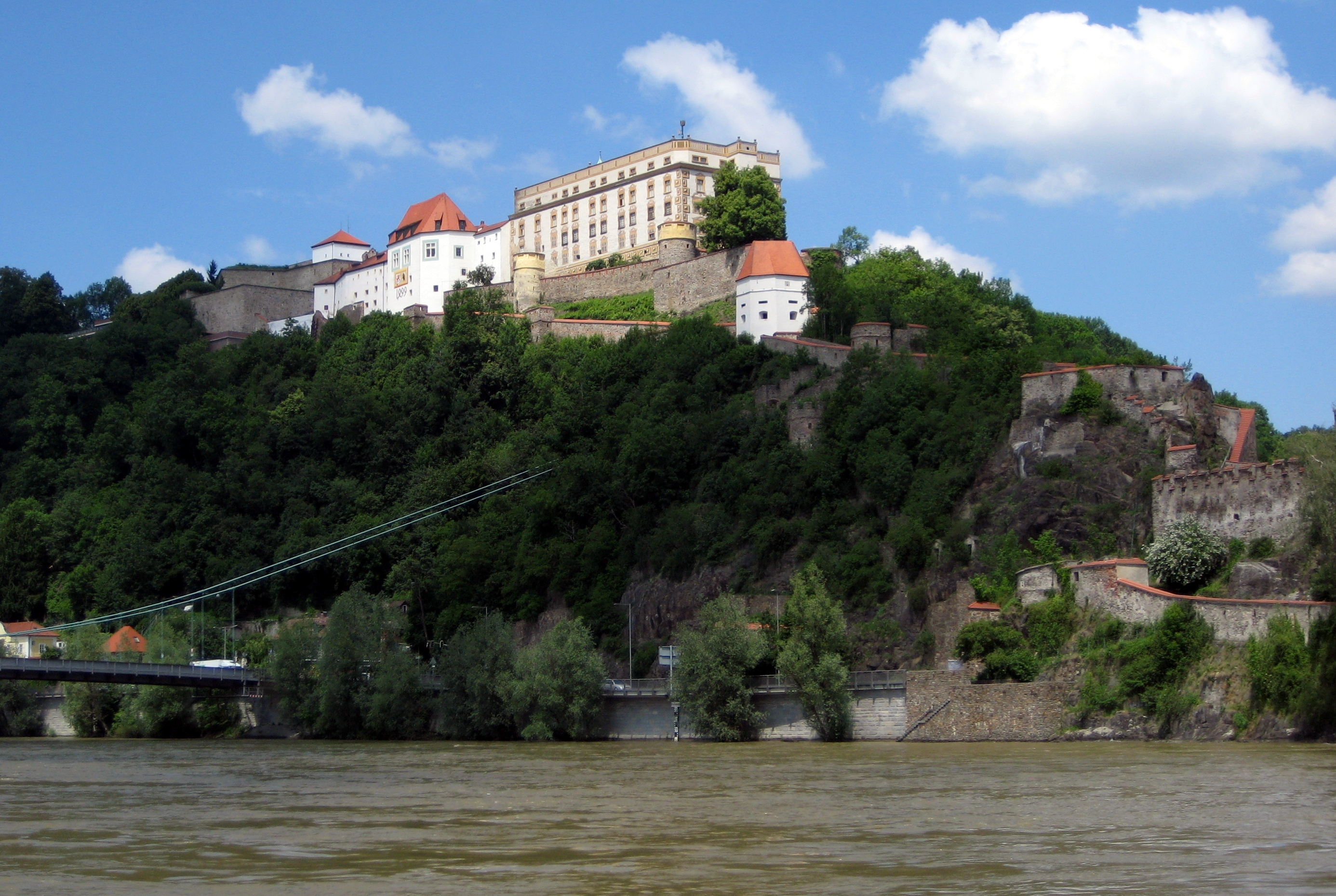
Veste Oberhaus

1. Alte Residenz Passau
2. Neue Residenz Passau
3. Residenz (Passau)
4. Schloss Eggendobl
5. Schloss Freudenhain
6. Veste Niederhaus
7. Veste Oberhaus

=== Landkreis Freyung-Grafenau ===
1. Saldenburg, Saldenburg

=== Landkreis Kelheim ===
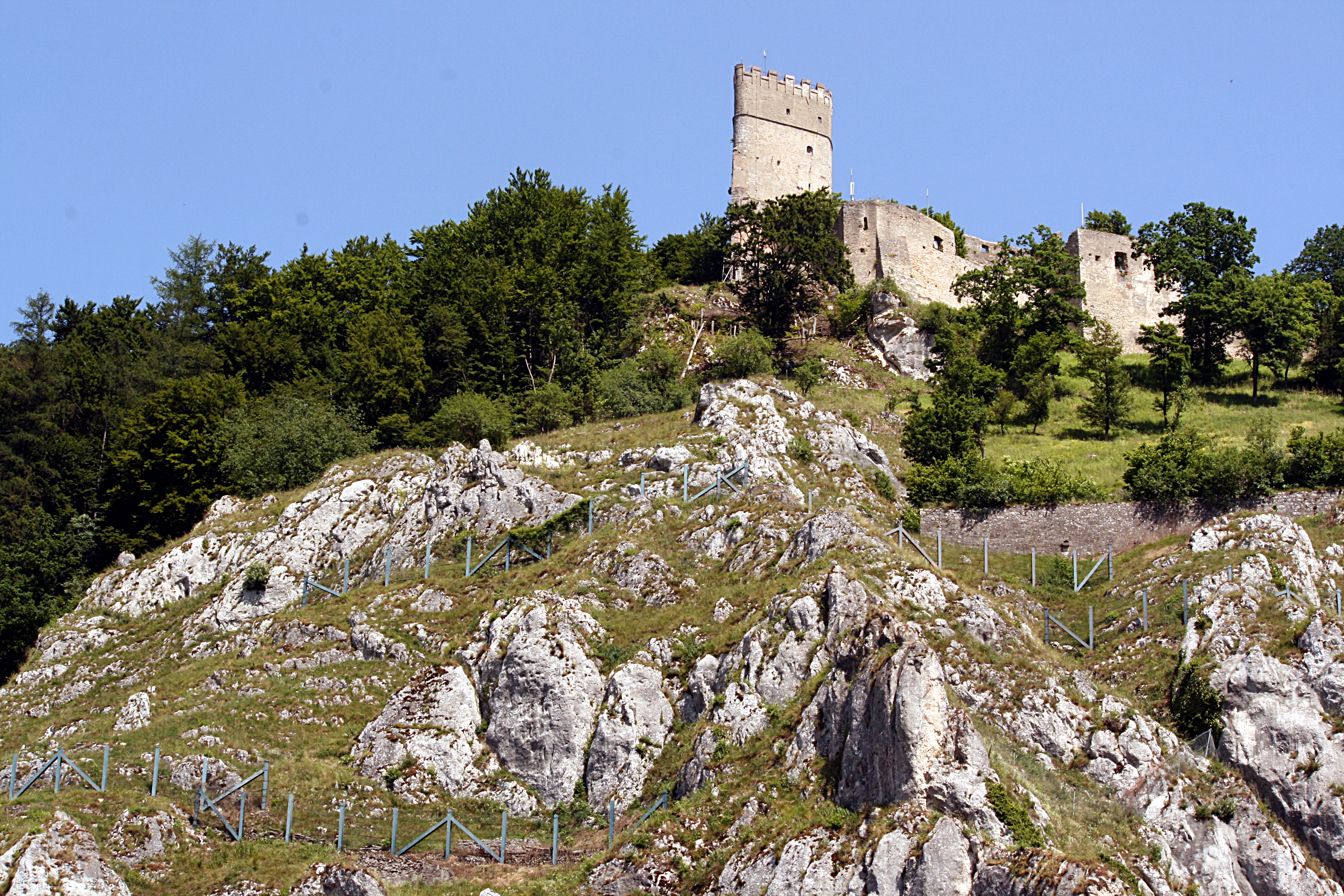
Burg Randeck

1. Burg Eggersberg, Riedenburg
2. Burg Prunn, Riedenburg
3. Burgruine Rabenstein, Riedenburg
4. Burg Randeck, Essing
5. Schloss Rosenburg, Riedenburg
6. Burgruine Tachenstein, Riedenburg
7. Schloss Train, Train
8. Schloss Wildenberg, Wildenberg

=== Landkreis Passau ===
1. Ruine Altjochenstein, Untergriesbach
2. Englburg, Tittling
3. Schloss Neuburg am Inn, Neuburg am Inn
4. Schloss Neuhaus am Inn, Neuhaus am Inn
5. Schloss Obernzell, Obernzell
6. Schloss Ortenburg, Ortenburg

=== Landkreis Regen ===
1. Burg Altnußberg, Geiersthal
2. Burg Neunußberg, Viechtach
3. Burg Weißenstein, Regen

=== Landkreis Rottal-Inn ===
1. Oberes Schloss Arnstorf, Arnstorf
2. Unteres Schloss Arnstorf, Arnstorf
3. Schloss Ering, Ering
4. Schloss Mariakirchen, Arnstorf
5. Schloss Münchsdorf, Roßbach
6. Schloss Schönau, Schönau
7. Schloss Thurnstein, Postmünster

=== Landkreis Straubing-Bogen ===
1. Burg Neurandsberg, Rattenberg

== Regierungsbezirk Oberpfalz ==
=== Amberg ===
1. Kurfürstliches Schloss

=== Regensburg ===
1. Schloss Thurn und Taxis

=== Landkreis Amberg-Sulzbach ===
1. Burg Dagestein, Vilseck
2. Burg Heimhof, Ursensollen
3. Burgruine Hohenburg, Hohenburg
4. Klosterburg Kastl, Kastl
5. Burgruine Lichtenegg, Birgland
6. Burgruine Pfaffenhofen (Schweppermannsburg), Kastl
7. Schloss Sulzbach, Sulzbach-Rosenberg
8. Schloss Schmidmühlen, Schmidmühlen
9. Hammerherrenschloss Theuern, Schloss Theuern, Kümmersbruck
10. Burgruine Poppberg, Birgland

=== Landkreis Cham ===
1. Burgruine Chameregg, Cham
2. Burg Falkenstein, Falkenstein
3. Burgruine Kürnberg, Stamsried
4. Burgruine Runding, Runding
5. Burg Schwärzenberg, Roding
6. Burg Schwarzenburg, Rötz
7. Schloss Altrandsberg, Miltach
8. Schloss Miltach, Miltach
9. Schloss Thierlstein, Cham
10. Schloss Zandt, Blaibach

=== Landkreis Neumarkt in der Oberpfalz ===
1. Burgruine Adelburg, Seubersdorf in der Oberpfalz
2. Burgruine Breitenegg, Breitenbrunn
3. Deutschordensschloss, Postbauer-Heng
4. Burgruine Haimburg, Berg bei Neumarkt in der Oberpfalz
5. Burgruine Heinrichsbürg (Heinzburg), Neumarkt in der Oberpfalz
6. Burgruine Helfenberg, Velburg
7. Burgruine Hohenfels, Hohenfels
8. Schloss Jettenhofen, Freystadt
9. Burg Lupburg, Lupburg
10. Burgruine Lutzmannstein, Velburg
11. Pfalzgrafenschloss Neumarkt, Neumarkt in der Oberpfalz
12. Burgruine Niedersulzbürg, Mühlhausen
13. Burgruine Obersulzbürg, Mühlhausen
14. Burg Parsberg, Parsberg
15. Schloss Pilsach, Pilsach
16. Schloss Rohrenstadt, Berg bei Neumarkt in der Oberpfalz
17. Schlossruine Pyrbaum, Pyrbaum
18. Schloss Töging, Dietfurt an der Altmühl
19. Burgruine Velburg, Velburg
20. Burgruine Wildenstein, Dietfurt an der Altmühl
21. Schloss Woffenbach, Neumarkt in der Oberpfalz
22. Wolfstein Castle, Neumarkt in der Oberpfalz

=== Landkreis Neustadt an der Waldnaab ===
1. Schloss Burgtreswitz, Moosbach
2. Flossenbürg Castle, Flossenbürg
3. Schloss Friedrichsburg, Vohenstrauß
4. Leuchtenberg Castle, Leuchtenberg
5. Neuhaus Castle, Windischeschenbach
6. Hammerschloss Röthenbach, Kohlberg
7. Altes Schloss, Neustadt an der Waldnaab
8. Neues Schloss, Neustadt an der Waldnaab
9. Parkstein Castle, Parkstein
10. Schellenberg Castle, Georgenberg

=== Landkreis Regensburg ===
1. Schloss Alteglofsheim, Alteglofsheim
2. Donaustauf Castle, Donaustauf
3. Ehrenfels Castle, Beratzhausen
4. Schloss Etterzhausen, Nittendorf
5. Forstenberg Castle, Regenstauf OT Ramspau/Karlstein
6. Schloss Höfling
7. Kallmünz Castle, Kallmünz
8. Schloss Karlstein, Regenstauf OT Karlstein
9. Laaber Castle, Laaber
10. Schloss Ramspau, Regenstauf OT Ramspau
11. Schloss Sünching, Sünching
12. Schloss Wörth, Wörth an der Donau
13. Wolfsegg Castle, Wolfsegg

=== Landkreis Schwandorf ===
1. Burg Frauenstein, Winklarn
2. Schloss Fronberg, Schwandorf
3. Burgruine Haus Murach, Oberviechtach
4. Burg Lengenfeld, Burglengenfeld
5. Schloss Münchshofen, Teublitz
6. Burgruine Stockenfels, Nittenau
7. Schloss Teublitz, Teublitz
8. Burg Wernberg, Wernberg-Köblitz

=== Landkreis Tirschenreuth ===
1. Altenstädter Schloss, Erbendorf
2. Burg Falkenberg, Falkenberg
3. Schloss Friedenfels, Friedenfels
4. Schloss Grötschenreuth, Erbendorf
5. Schloss Hardeck, Bad Neualbenreuth
6. Burgruine Liebenstein, Plößberg
7. Schloss Ottengrün, Bad Neualbenreuth
8. Schloss Reuth, Reuth b. Erbendorf
9. Schloss Thumsenreuth, Krummennaab
10. Burg Trautenberg, Krummennaab
11. Waldeck Castle, Kemnath
12. Schloss Waldershof, Waldershof
13. Burgruine Weißenstein, Waldershof
14. Schloss Wildenau, Plößberg
15. Schloss Wildenreuth, Erbendorf
16. Schloss Wolframshof, Kastl

== Regierungsbezirk Oberfranken ==
=== Bamberg ===
1. Altenburg
2. Burgellern Castle
3. Neue Residenz (Bamberg)

=== Bayreuth ===
1. Eremitage

=== Coburg ===
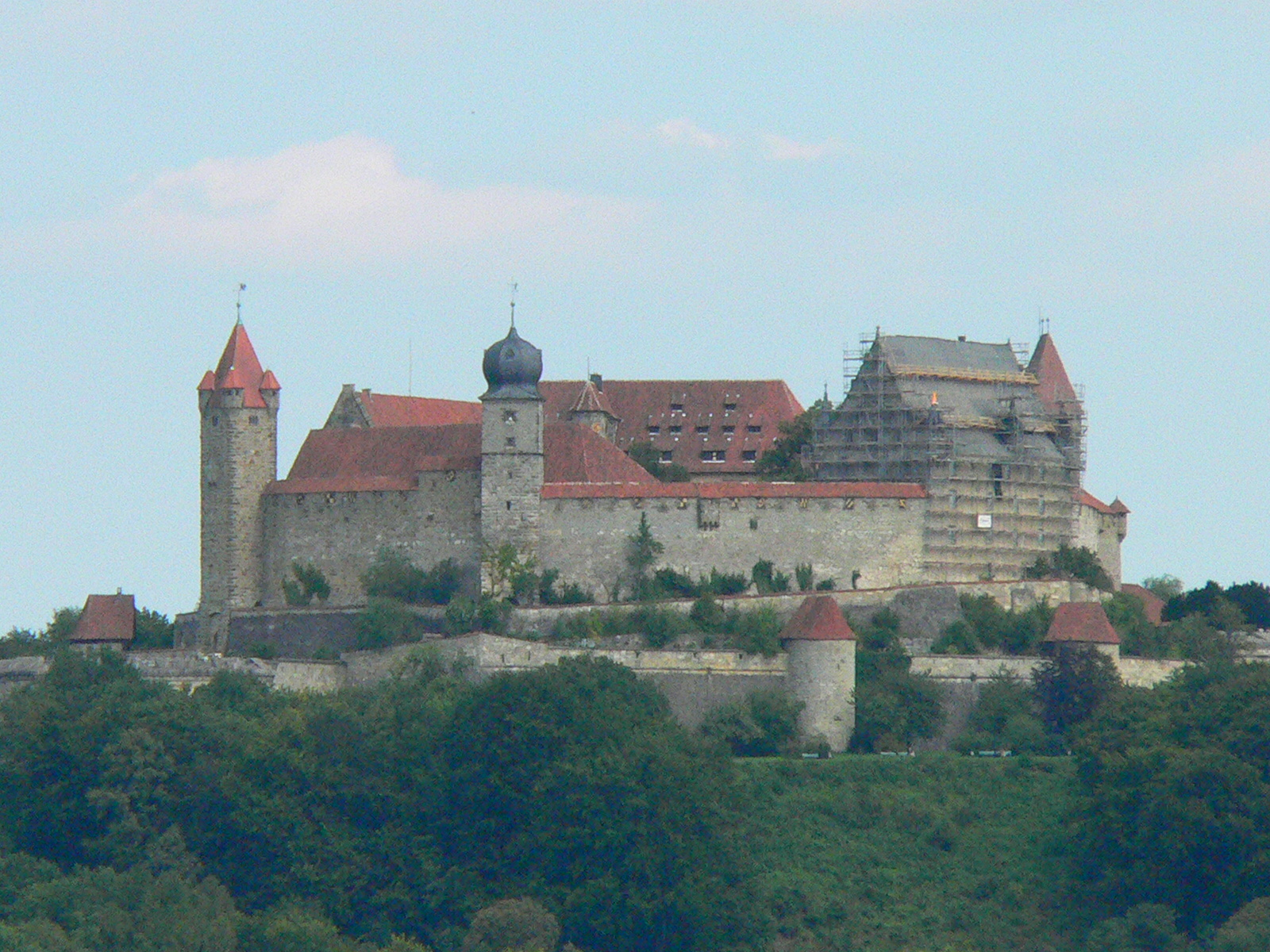
Veste Coburg

1. Bürglaß-Schlösschen
2. Schloss Callenberg
3. Edinburgh-Palais
4. Schloss Ehrenburg
5. Schloss Eichhof
6. Schloss Falkenegg
7. Schloss Hohenfels
8. Schloss Ketschendorf
9. Schloss Neuhof
10. Rosenauer Burg
11. Veste Coburg

=== Landkreis Bamberg ===
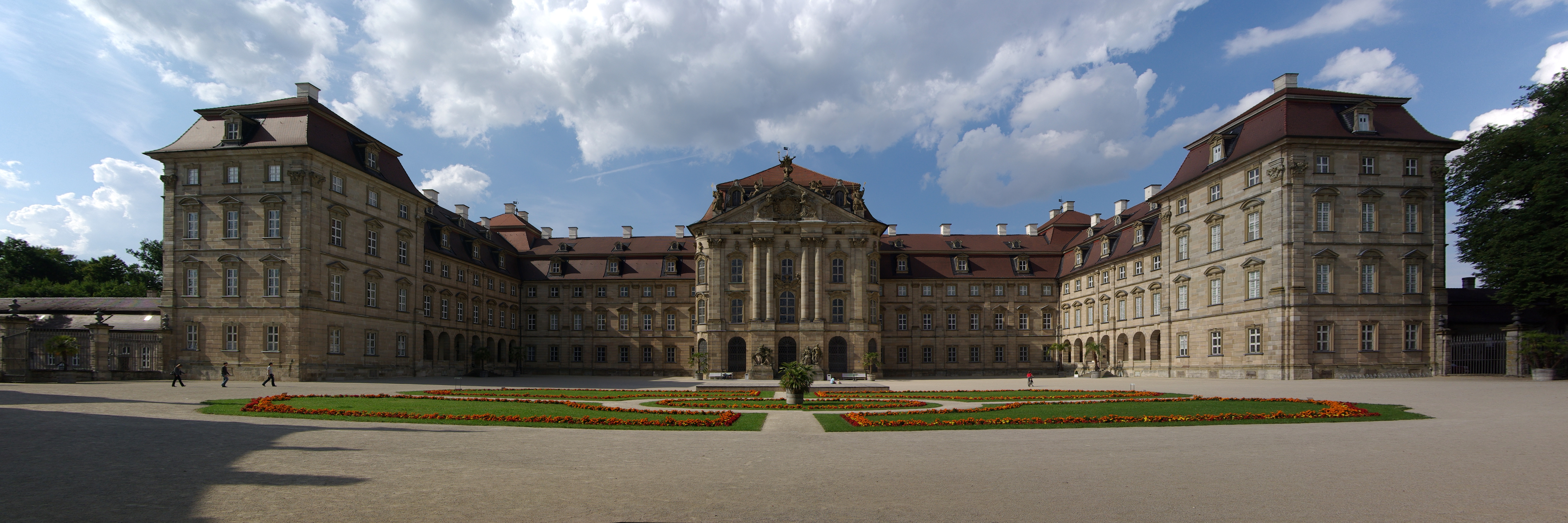
Schloss Weißenstein

1. Giech Castle, Scheßlitz
2. Schloss Greifenstein, Heiligenstadt in Oberfranken
3. Lisberg Castle, Lisberg
4. Schloss Seehof, Memmelsdorf
5. Wasserschloss Thüngfeld, Schlüsselfeld
6. Schloss Weißenstein, Pommersfelden
7. Schloss Wernsdorf, Strullendorf

=== Landkreis Bayreuth ===
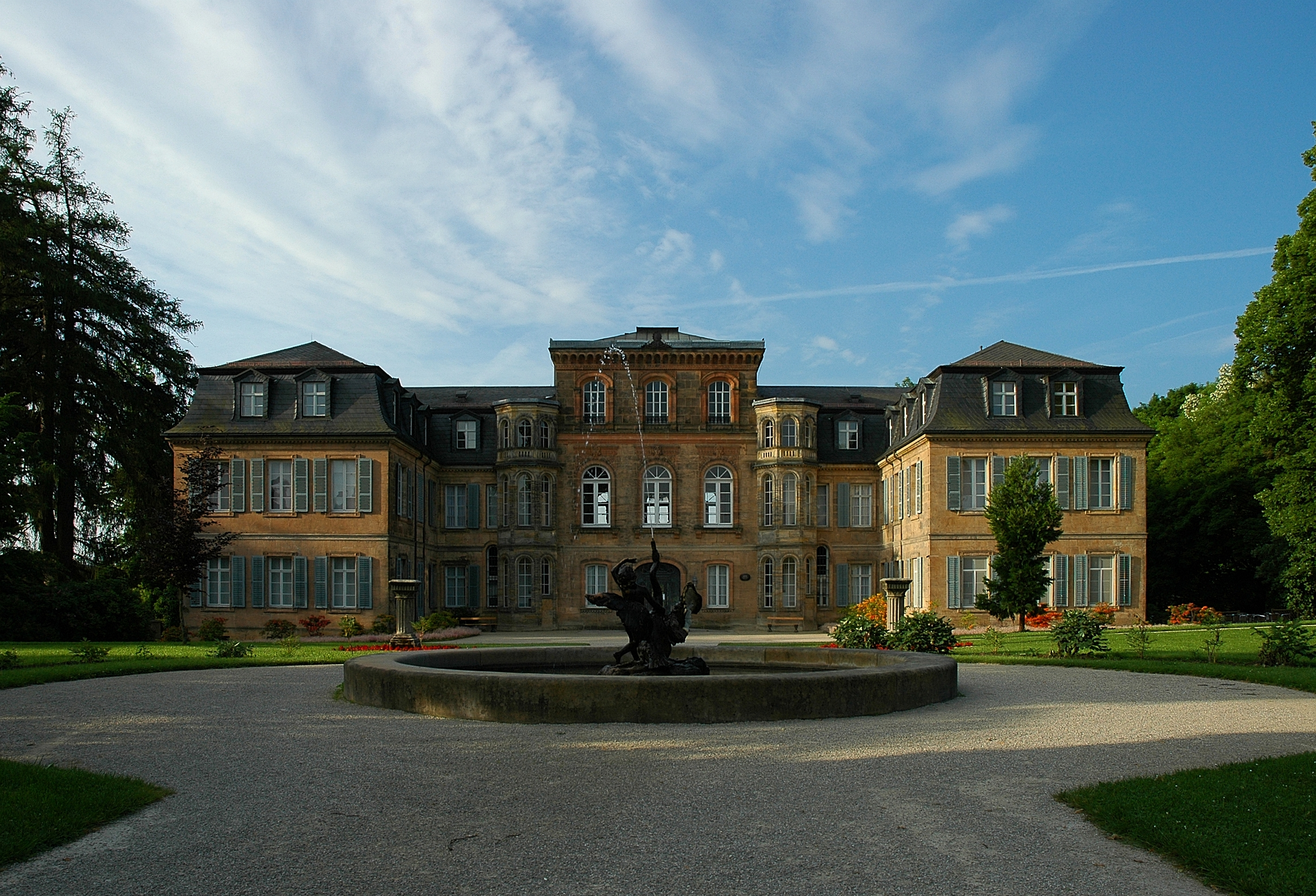
Fantaisie Palace (north view)

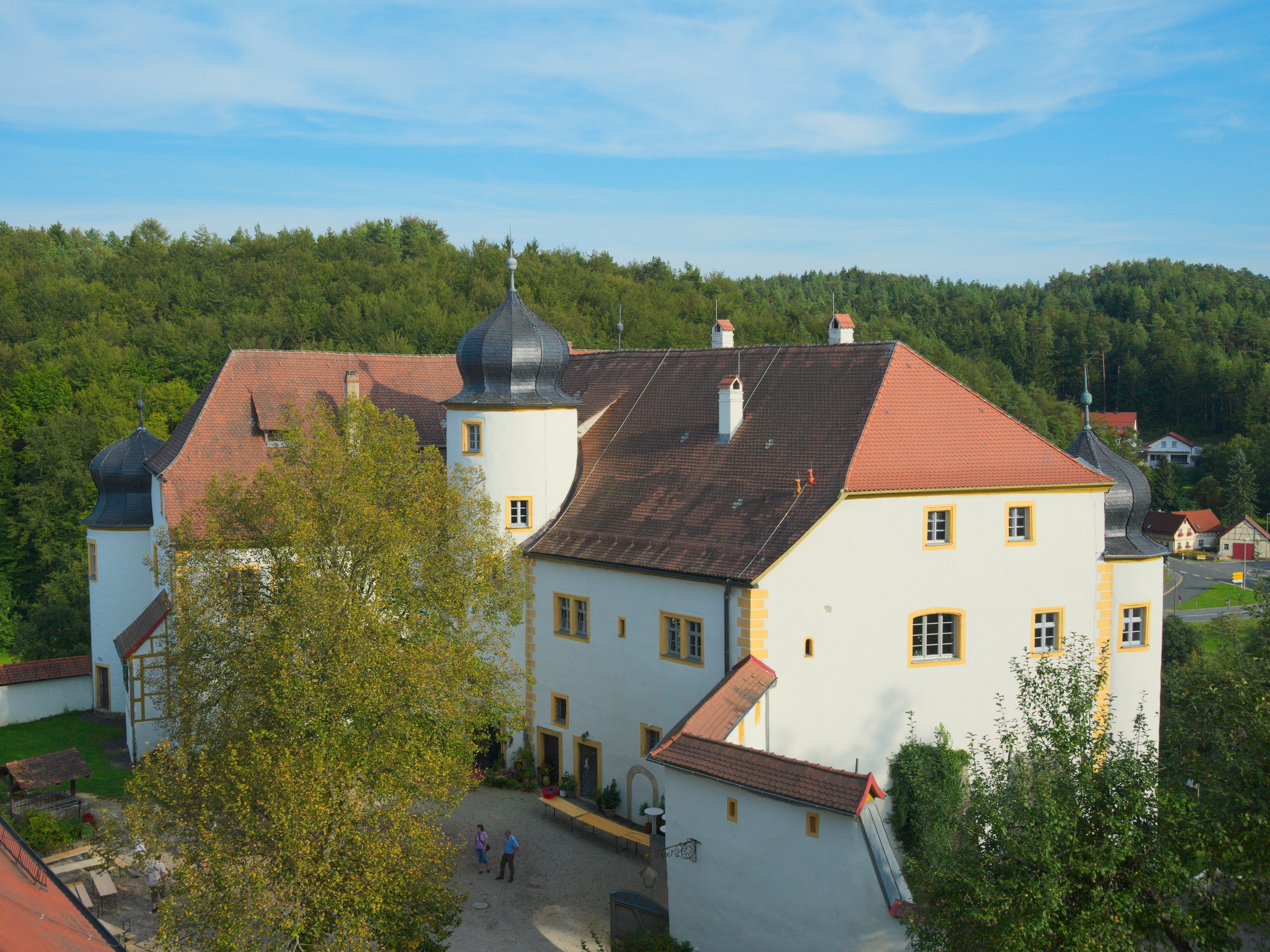
Unteraufseß Castle, inner courtyard

1. Schloss Fantaisie, Eckersdorf
2. Schloss Freienfels, Hollfeld
3. Hohenberneck Castle, Bad Berneck im Fichtelgebirge
4. Krögelstein Castle, Hollfeld
5. Leienfels Castle, Pottenstein
6. Lower Tüchersfeld Castle, Tüchersfeld
7. Neidenstein Castle, Hollfeld
8. Schloss Oberaufseß, Aufseß
9. Schloss Unteraufseß, Aufseß
10. Schloss Plankenfels, Plankenfels
11. Pottenstein Castle, Pottenstein
12. Rabeneck Castle, Waischenfeld
13. Rabenstein Castle, Ahorntal
14. Burgstall Schlosshügel, Weidenberg
15. Stein Castle, Gefrees
16. Schloss Trockau, Pegnitz
17. Upper Tüchersfeld Castle, Tüchersfeld
18. Wadendorf Castle, Plankenfels
19. Waischenfeld Castle, Waischenfeld
20. Wallenrode Castle, Bad Berneck im Fichtelgebirge
21. Walpotenburg Castle, Bad Berneck im Fichtelgebirge

=== Landkreis Coburg ===
1. Schloss Ahorn, Ahorn
2. Schloss Hohenstein, Ahorn
3. Schloss Lahm, Lahm/Itzgrund
4. Schloss Moggenbrunn, Meeder
5. Schloss Rosenau, Rödental
6. Schloss Tambach, Weitramsdorf

=== Landkreis Forchheim ===
1. Bärnfels Castle ruins, Obertrubach
2. Egloffstein Castle, Egloffstein
3. Gaillenreuth Castle, Ebermannstadt
4. Gößweinstein Castle, Gößweinstein
5. Hiltpoltstein Castle, Hiltpoltstein
6. Kohlstein Castle, Gößweinstein
7. Schloss Kunreuth, Kunreuth
8. Neideck Castle, Streitberg
9. Regensberg Castle ruins, Kunreuth
10. Streitburg Castle ruins, Wiesenttal
11. Thuisbrunn Castle, Gräfenberg
12. Schloss Thurn, Heroldsbach
13. Schloss Wiesenthau, Wiesenthau
14. Wolfsberg Castle ruins, Obertrubach
15. Wolkenstein Castle, Ebermannstadt

=== Landkreis Hof ===
1. Lichtenberg Castle, Lichtenberg
2. Schloss Reitzenstein

=== Landkreis Kronach ===
1. Oberes Schloss Friesen, Kronach
2. Unteres Schloss Friesen, Kronach
3. Schloss Haig, Stockheim
4. Schloss Hain, Küps
5. Hinteres (Neues) Schloss Küps, Küps
6. Mittleres (Altes) Schloss Küps, Küps
7. Oberes Schloss Küps, Küps
8. Burg Lauenstein, Ludwigsstadt
9. Oberes Schloss Mitwitz, Mitwitz
10. Unteres Schloss Mitwitz, Mitwitz
11. Schloss Nagel, Küps
12. Schloss Oberlangenstadt, Küps
13. Festung Rosenberg, Kronach
14. Heunischenburg bei Gehülz, Kronach
15. Schlossruine Rothenkirchen, Pressig
16. Schloss Schmölz, Küps
17. Schloss Stockheim, Stockheim
18. Schloss Theisenort, Küps

=== Landkreis Kulmbach ===
1. Plassenburg, Kulmbach
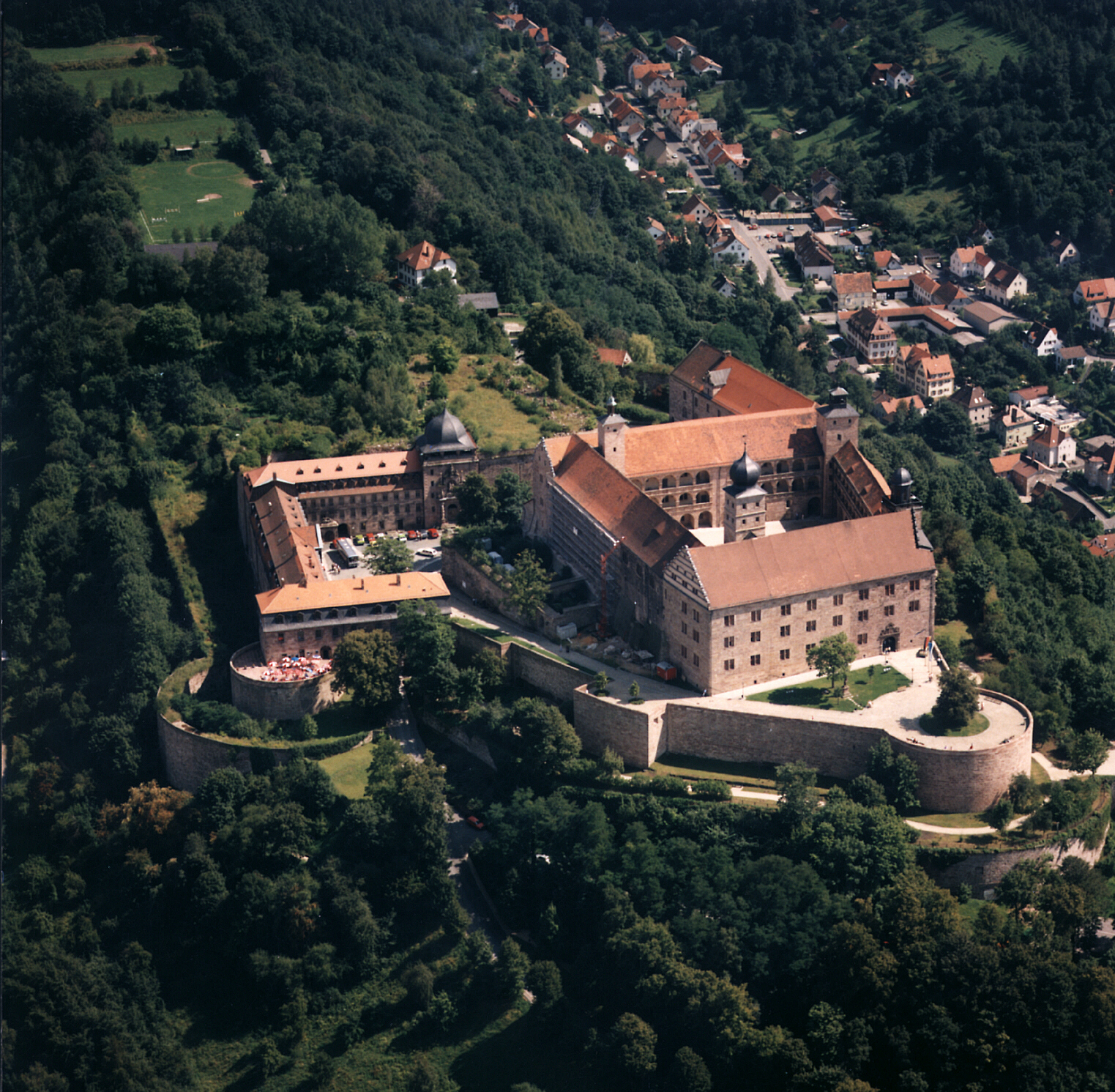
  Plassenburg, Kulmbach
2. Schloss Thurnau, Thurnau
3. Burg Wernstein, Mainleus
4. Burg Wildenstein, Presseck
5. Burg Zwernitz und Felsengarten Sanspareil, Wonsees

=== Landkreis Lichtenfels ===
1. Schloss Banz, Bad Staffelstein

=== Landkreis Wunsiedel im Fichtelgebirge ===
1. Schloss Alexandersbad, Bad Alexandersbad
2. Schloss Brand, Marktredwitz
3. Epprechtstein Castle
4. The ruins of Hirschstein Castle on the Großer Kornberg in the Fichtel Mountains
5. Hohenberg Castle, Hohenberg an der Eger
6. Kaiserhammer hunting lodge, Marktleuthen
7. The ruins of the Luxburg on the Luisenburg in the Fichtel Mountains
8. Röthenbach Castle, Arzberg
9. Castle ruins and palace of Neuhaus a. d. Eger, town of Hohenberg an der Eger
10. The castle on the Rudolfstein near Weißenstadt
11. Thierstein Castle, Thierstein
12. The castles on the Waldstein

== Regierungsbezirk Mittelfranken ==
=== Ansbach ===
1. Residenz Ansbach

=== Erlangen ===
1. ehemaliges Schlösschen Bruck (Herrensitz)
2. Markgräfliches Schloss Erlangen
3. Schloss Tennenlohe

=== Fürth ===
1. Schloss Burgfarrnbach
2. Schloss Steinach
3. ehemaliges Wasserschloss Vach (Herrensitz)

=== Nürnberg ===
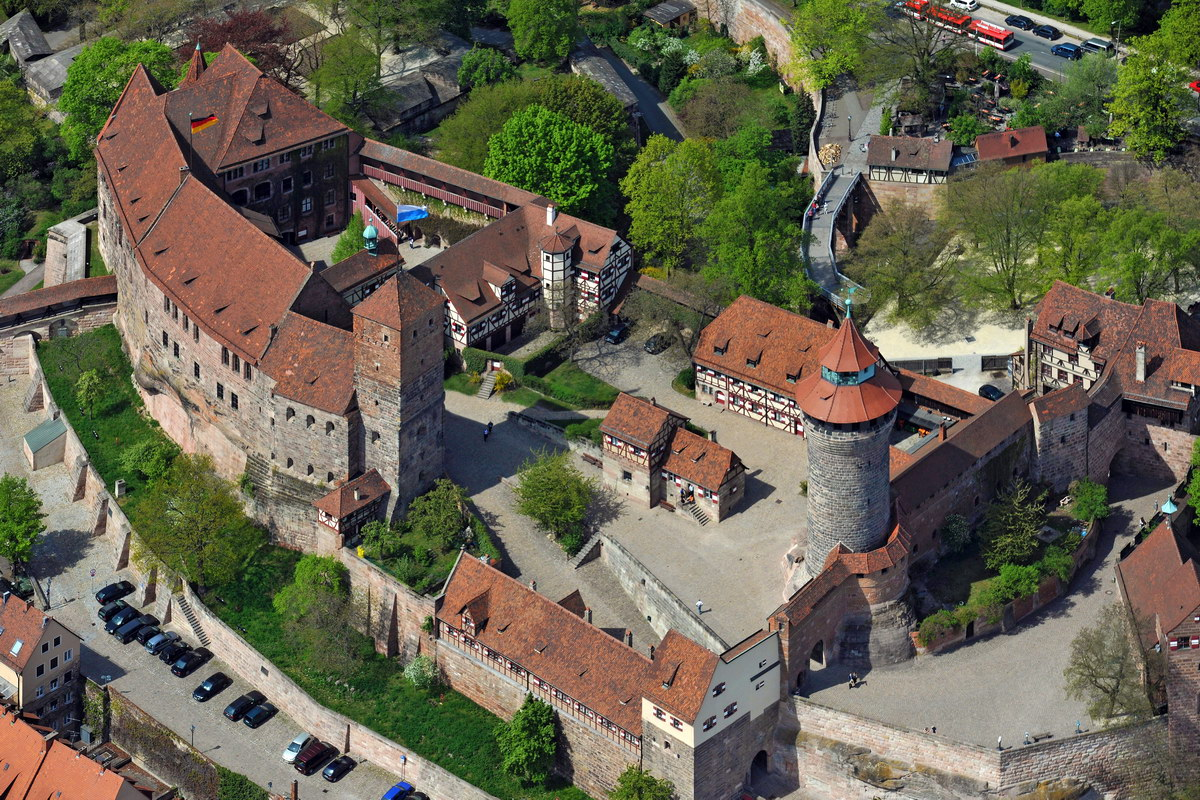
Nuremberg Castle

1. Nürnberger Burg
2. City walls of Nuremberg
3. Burgen, Schlösser und Herrensitze im Stadtgebiet Nürnberg

=== Schwabach ===
1. ehemaliges Wasserschloss Wolkersdorf (Herrensitz)

=== Landkreis Ansbach ===
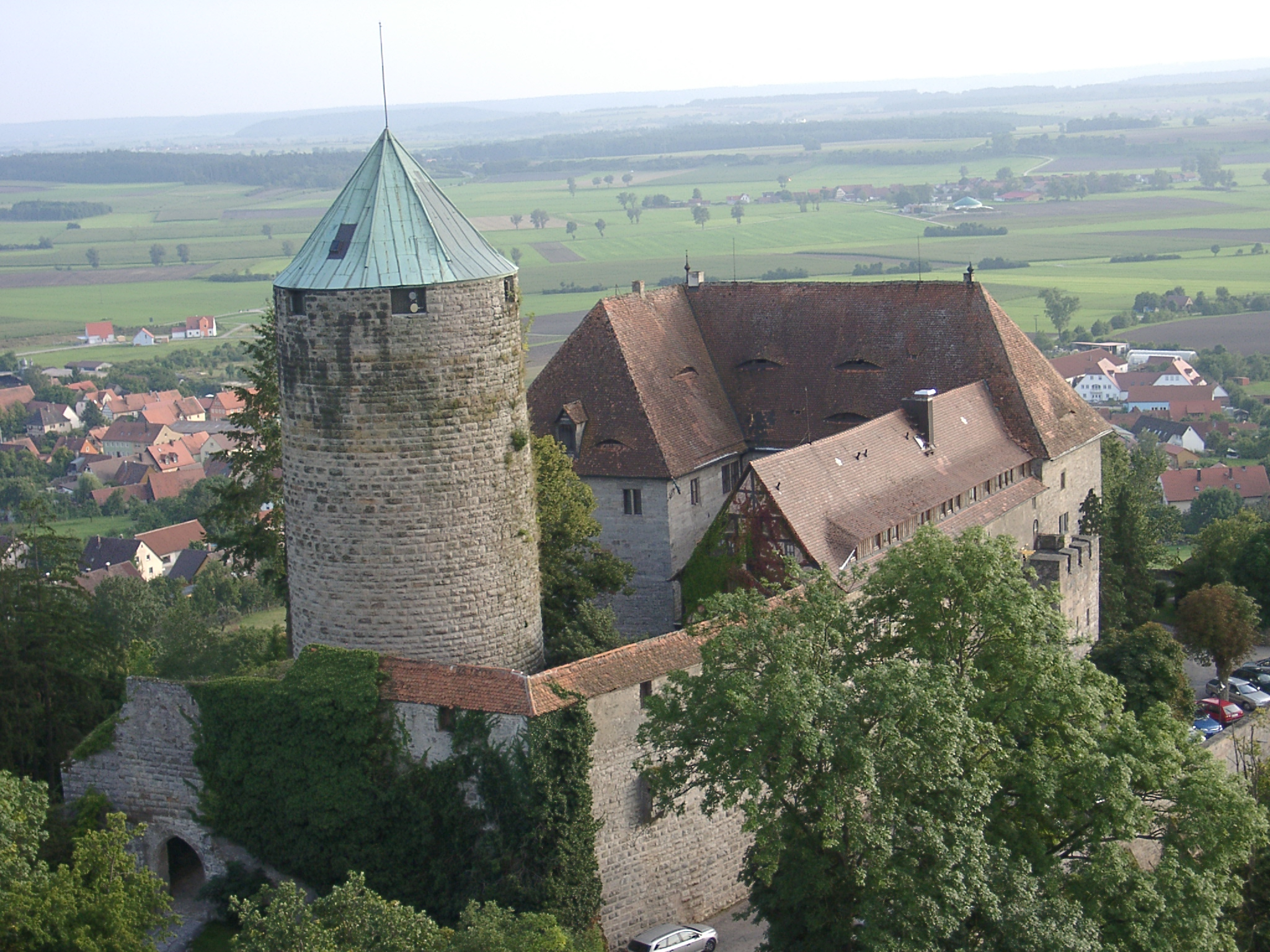
Burg Colmberg

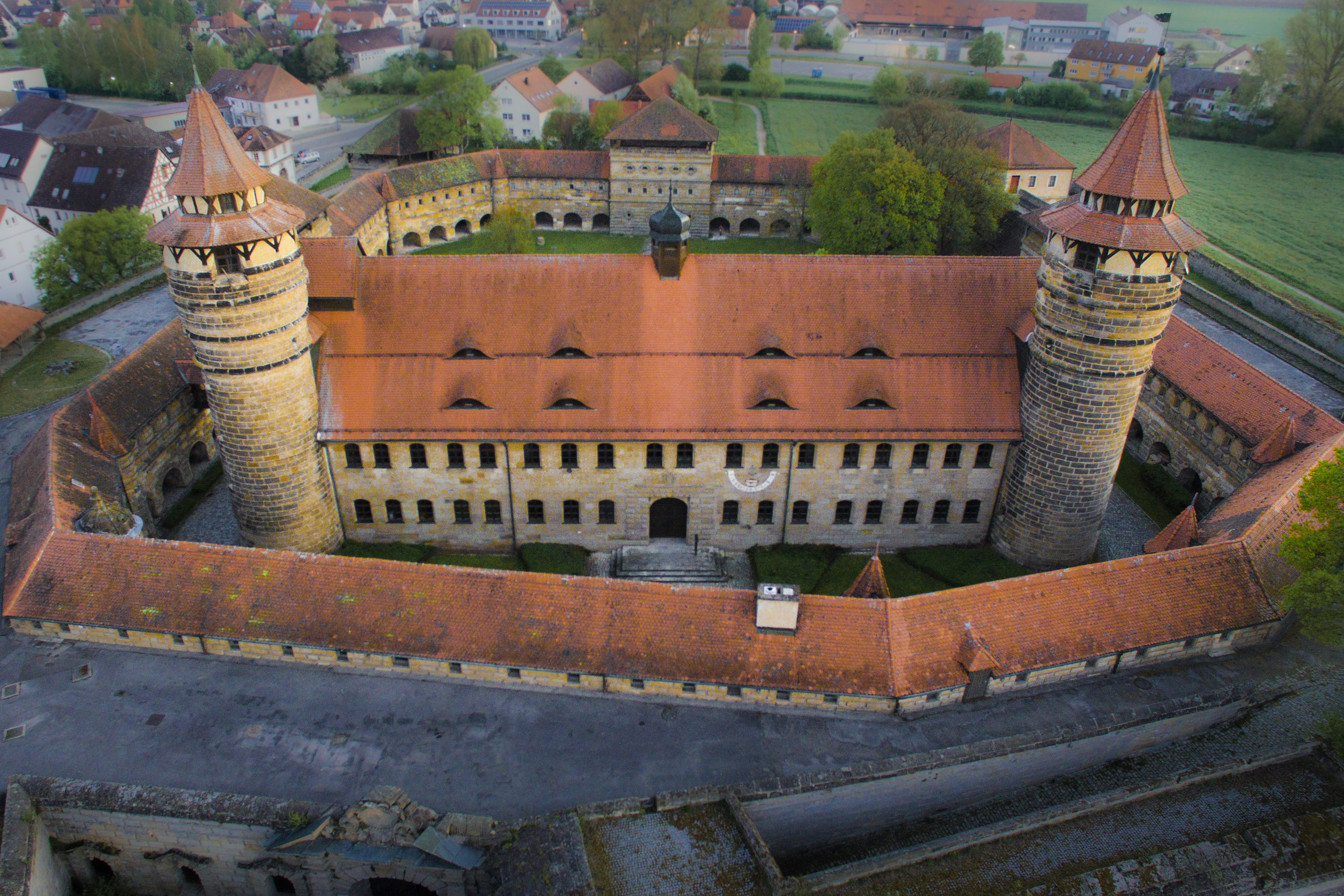
Lichtenau Fortress

1. Schloss Bruckberg, Bruckberg
2. Colmberg Castle, Colmberg
3. Schloss Dennenlohe, Unterschwaningen
4. Deutschordensschloss Dinkelsbühl, Dinkelsbühl
5. Schloss Dürrwangen, Dürrwangen
6. Schloss Habelsee, Ohrenbach
7. Herrieden Castle, Herrieden
8. Lehrberg Castle, Lehrberg
9. Leonrod Castle, Dietenhofen
10. Lichtenau Fortress, Lichtenau
11. Schloss Neuendettelsau, Neuendettelsau
12. Ruine Rosenberg, Rügland
13. Schloss Rügland, Rügland
14. Schloss Schillingsfürst, Schillingsfürst
15. Schloss Sommersdorf, Burgoberbach
16. Topplerschlösschen, Rothenburg ob der Tauber
17. Schloss Triesdorf, Weidenbach
18. Schloss Unterschwaningen, Unterschwaningen
19. Virnsberg Castle, Flachslanden
20. Wahrberg Castle, Aurach
21. Schloss Wassertrüdingen, Wassertrüdingen
22. Schloss Windelsbach, Windelsbach
23. Vogteischloss Wolframs-Eschenbach, Wolframs-Eschenbach

=== Landkreis Erlangen-Höchstadt ===
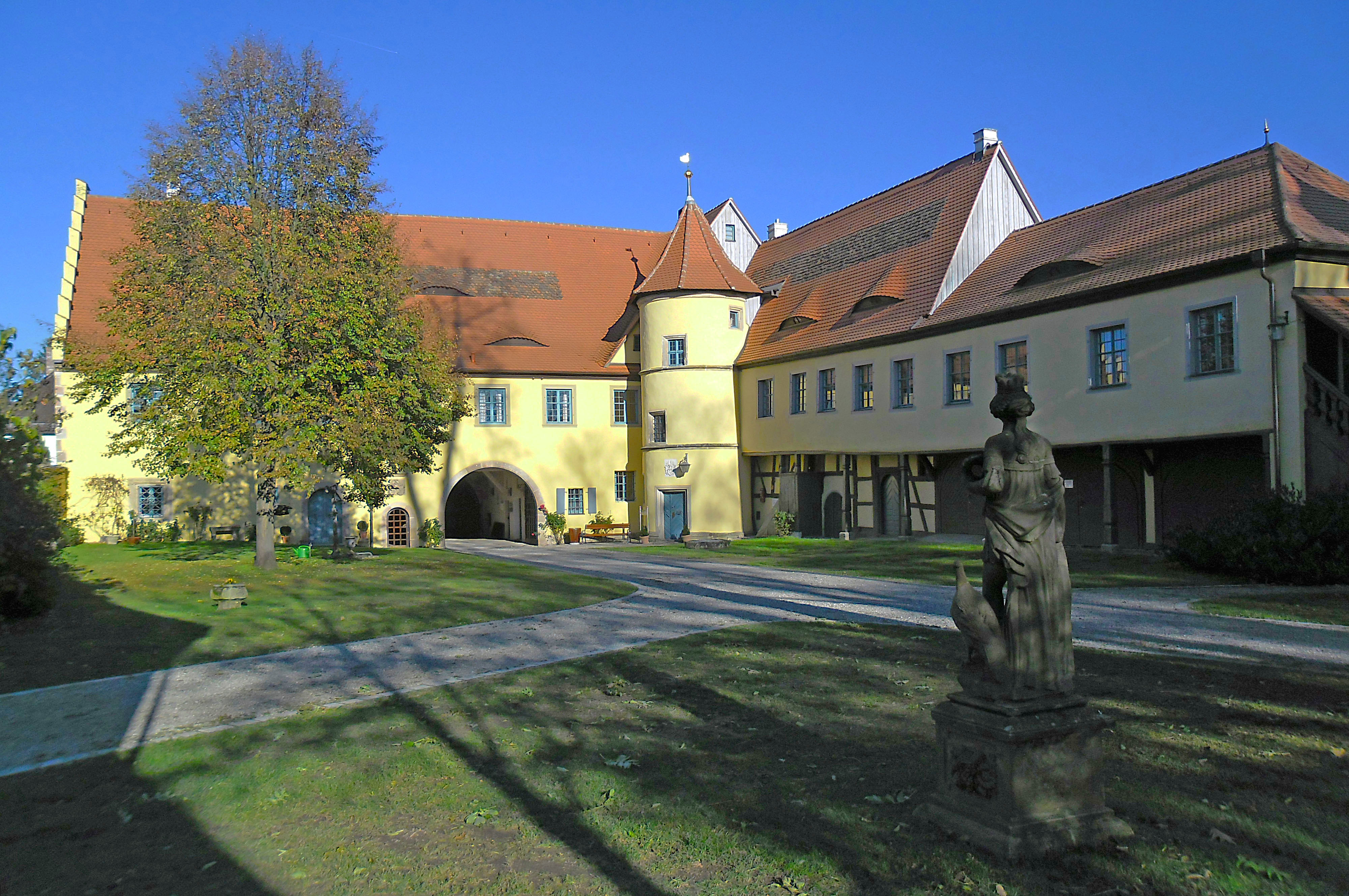
Schloss Adelsdorf

1. Schloss Adelsdorf, Adelsdorf
2. Schloss Hemhofen, Hemhofen
3. Schloss Herzogenaurach, Herzogenaurach
4. Schloss Höchstadt, Höchstadt an der Aisch
5. Schloss Neuenbürg, Weisendorf
6. Schloss Neuhaus, Adelsdorf
7. Schloss Weingartsgreuth, Wachenroth
8. Schloss Weisendorf, Weisendorf

=== Landkreis Fürth ===
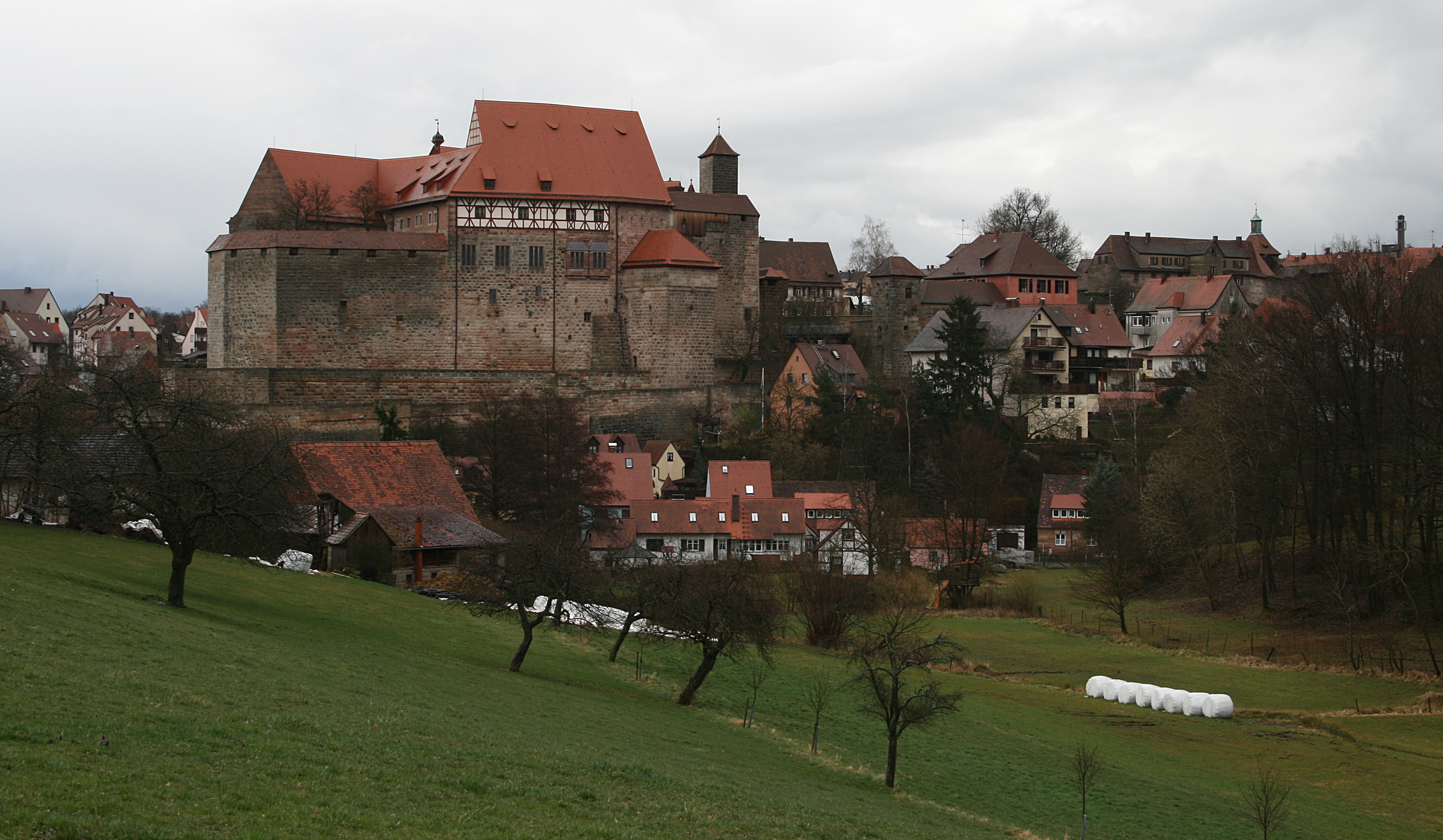
Cadolzburg

1. Cadolzburg, Cadolzburg
2. Faberschloss, Stein

=== Landkreis Neustadt an der Aisch-Bad Windsheim ===
1. Schloss Breitenlohe, Breitenlohe
2. Burg Hoheneck, Ipsheim
3. Schloss Obernzenn, Obernzenn
4. Schloss Schwarzenberg, Scheinfeld
5. Schloss Trautskirchen, Trautskirchen
6. Schloss Unternzenn, Obernzenn

=== Landkreis Nürnberger Land ===
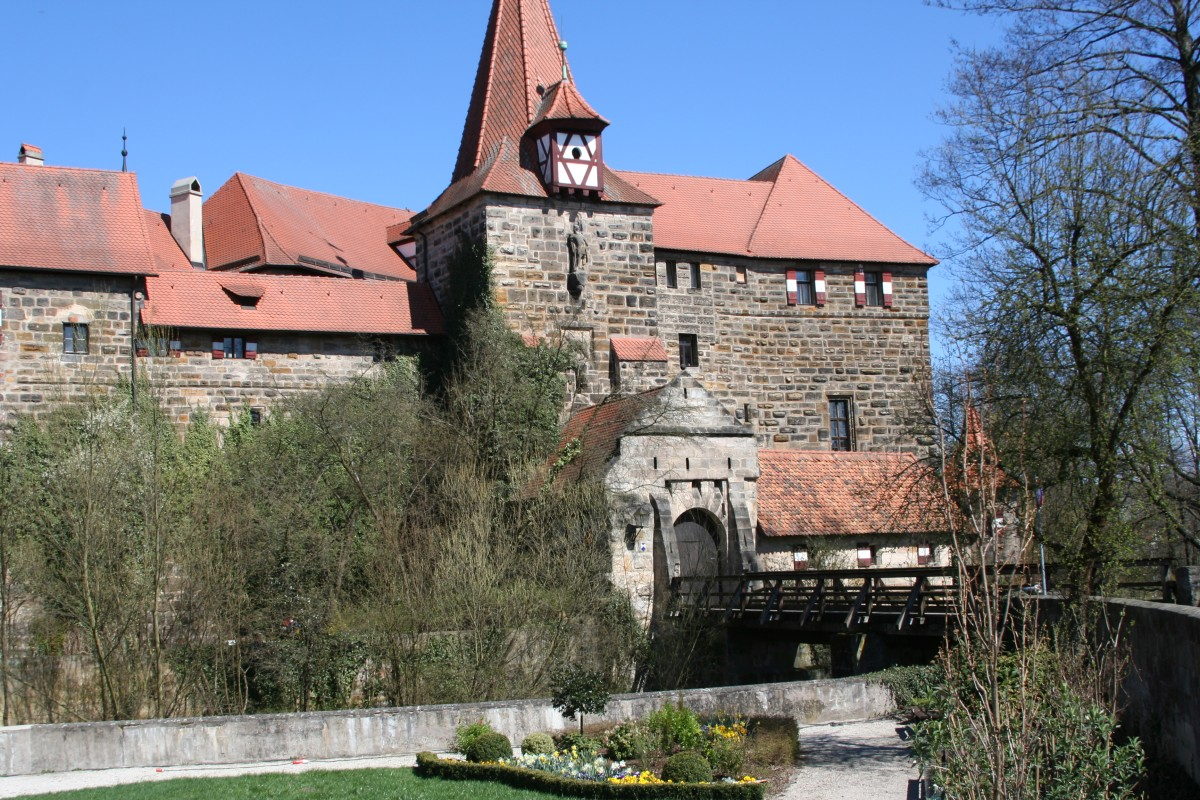
The Wenzelschloss of Emperor Charles IV in Lauf an der Pegnitz

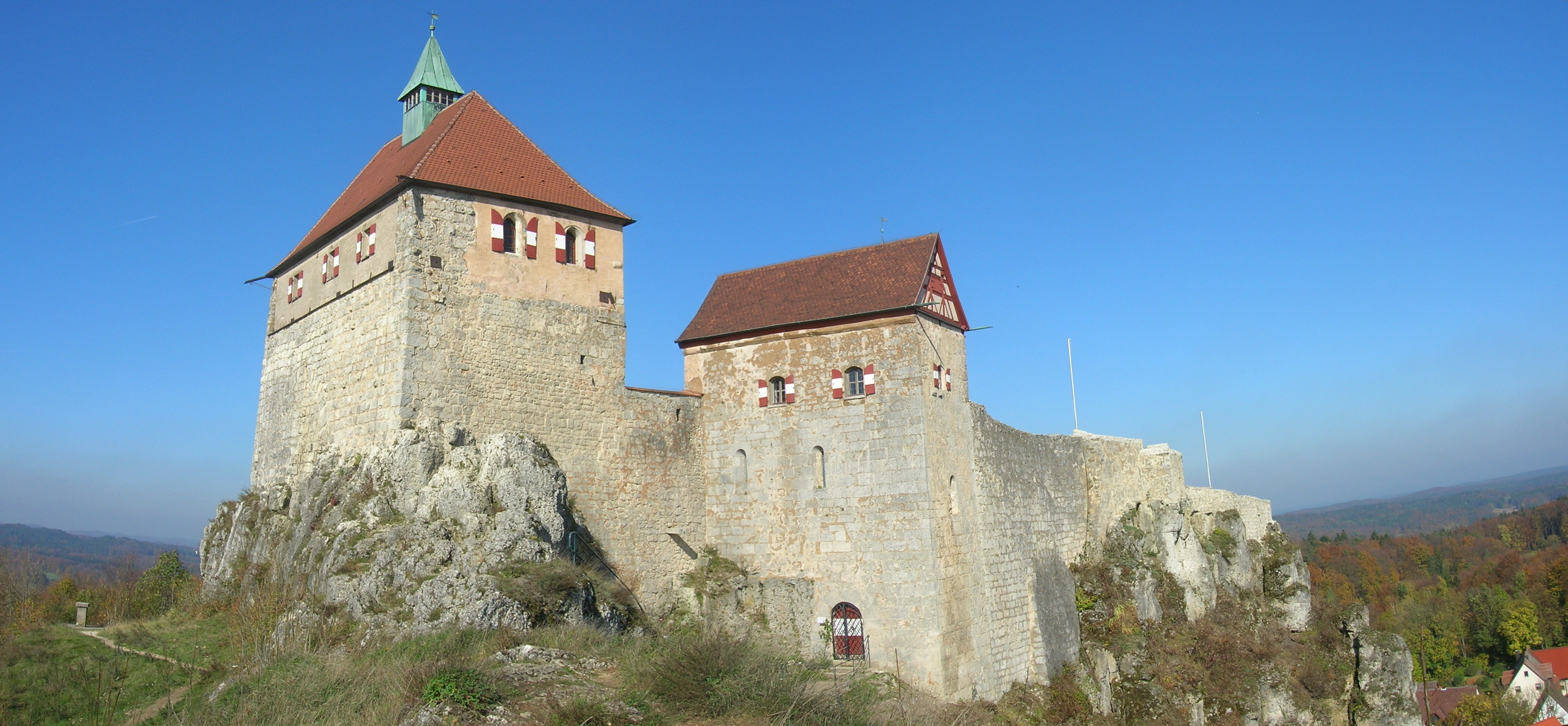
Burg Hohenstein

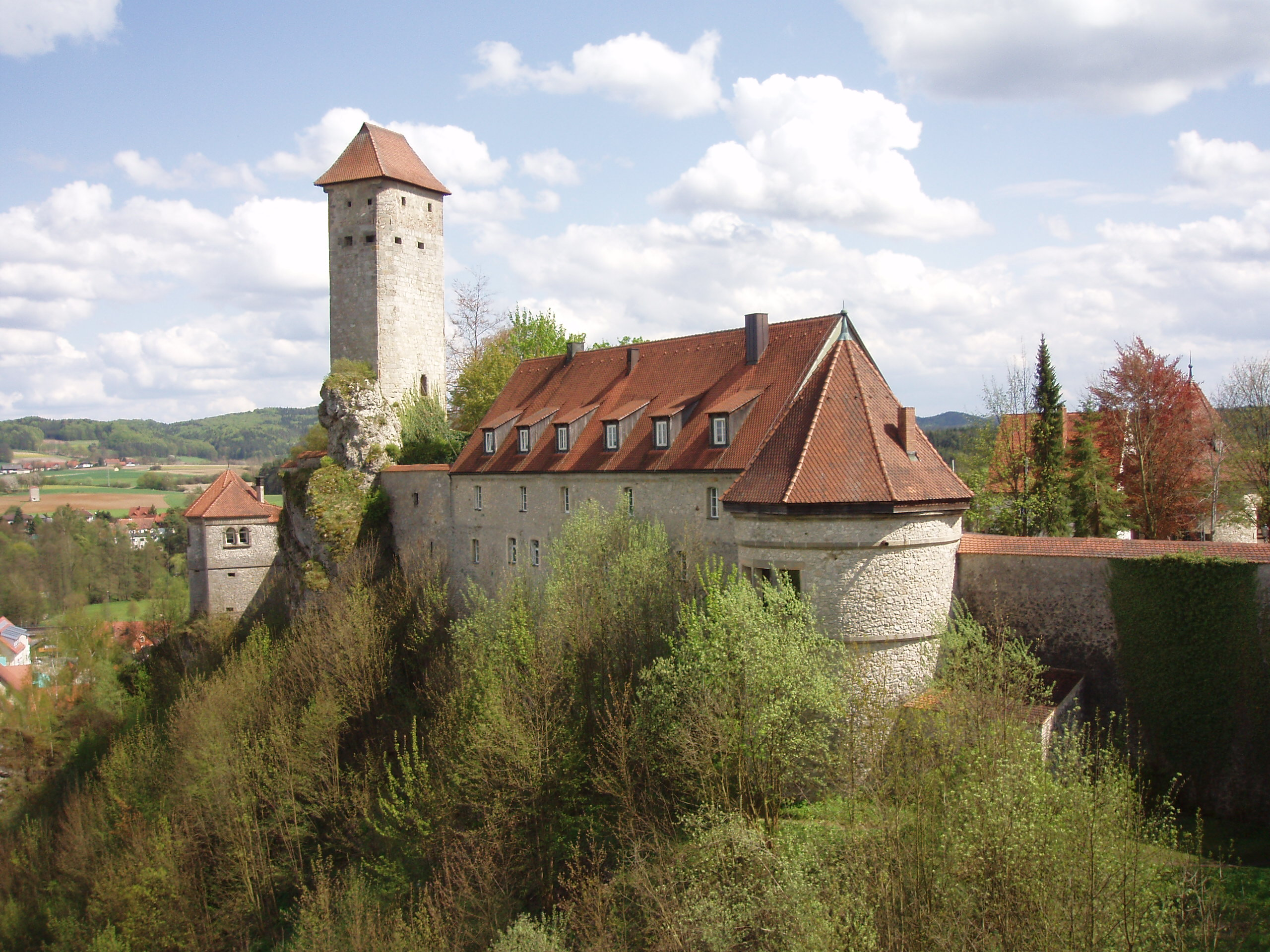
Burg Veldenstein

1. Pflegschloss Altdorf, Altdorf bei Nürnberg
2. Schloss Artelshofen, Vorra
3. Ruine Burgthann, Burgthann
4. Schloss Eschenbach, Pommelsbrunn
5. Burgruine Lichtenstein, Pommelsbrunn
6. Schloss Grünsberg, Altdorf bei Nürnberg
7. Burg Hartenstein, Hartenstein
8. Schloss Hersbruck, Hersbruck
9. Burg Hohenstein, Kirchensittenbach
10. Schloss Kirchensittenbach, Kirchensittenbach
11. Wasserburg Malmsbach, Schwaig bei Nürnberg
12. Burg Osternohe, Schnaittach
13. Schloss Reichenschwand, Reichenschwand
14. Rothenberg Fortress, Schnaittach
15. Thann Castle, Burgthann
16. Tucherschloss, Simmelsdorf
17. Schloss Utzmannsbach, Simmelsdorf
18. Burg Veldenstein, Neuhaus an der Pegnitz
19. Wenzelschloss, Lauf an der Pegnitz
20. Burg Wildenfels, Simmelsdorf

=== Landkreis Roth ===
1. Burg Abenberg, Stadt Abenberg
2. Burgstall Allersberg, Markt Allersberg
3. Schlösschen Appelhof, Markt Allersberg
4. Schloss Greding, Stadt Greding
5. Burgruine Hofberg, Stadt Greding
6. Bleymerschlösschen bei Kraftsbuch, Stadt Greding
7. Burgstall Altenheideck, Stadt Heideck
8. Burgstall Fäßleinsberg, Stadt Hilpoltstein
9. Burgruine Hilpoltstein, Stadt Hilpoltstein
10. Residenz Hilpoltstein, Stadt Hilpoltstein
11. Burgstall Hinterhausen/Schlossberg, Stadt Heideck
12. Schloss Kreuth, Stadt Heideck
13. Wehrkirche Mindorf, Stadt Hilpoltstein
14. Burgstall Meckenhausen, Stadt Hilpoltstein
15. Burgstall Mörlach (Minettenheim), Stadt Hilpoltstein
16. Schlösschen Mörlach, Stadt Hilpoltstein
17. Burgstall Oberrödel, Stadt Hilpoltstein
18. Wasserschloss Zell, Stadt Hilpoltstein
19. Markgrafenschloss Ratibor, Stadt Roth
20. Seckendorffschlösschen in Roth, Stadt Roth
21. Burgstall Wartstein, Stadt Roth
22. Burgstall Aue, Markt Thalmässing
23. Burgstall "Burschl" bei Aue, Markt Thalmässing
24. Niederungsburg/Markgrafenschloss Eysölden, Markt Thalmässing
25. Wehrkirche Eysölden, Markt Thalmässing
26. Schlösschen Gebersdorf, Markt Thalmässing
27. Burgstall Landeck, Markt Thalmässing
28. Burgstall "Alter Berg" bei Stauf, Markt Thalmässing
29. Burgruine Stauff, Markt Thalmässing
30. Burg Wernfels, Stadt Spalt
31. Schlösschen in Enderndorf, Stadt Spalt
32. Schlösschen Untererlbach, Stadt Spalt
33. Schloss Kugelhammer
34. Schloss Dürrenmungenau
35. Burgstall Harrlach

=== Landkreis Weißenburg-Gunzenhausen ===
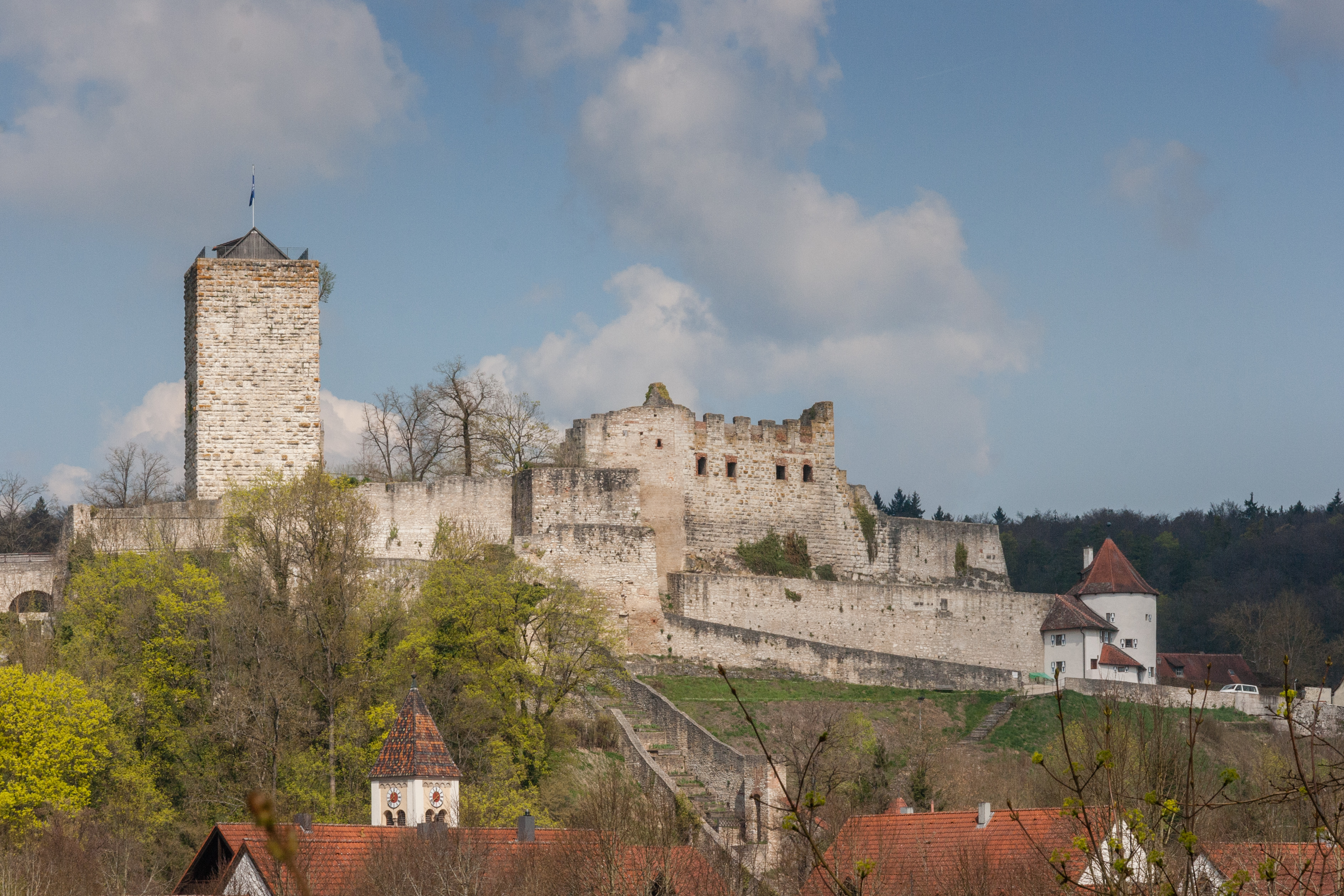
Burg Pappenheim

1. Schloss Absberg, Absberg
2. Schloss Altenmuhr, Muhr am See
3. Burg Bechthal, Raitenbuch
4. Schloss Cronheim, Gunzenhausen
5. Ellingen Residence, Ellingen
6. Schloss Geyern, Bergen
7. Burg Pappenheim, Pappenheim
8. Schloss Sandsee, Pleinfeld
9. Schloss Spielberg, Gnotzheim
10. Schloss Stopfenheim, Ellingen
11. Schloss Syburg, Bergen
12. Schloss Wald, Gunzenhausen
13. Festung Wülzburg, Weißenburg in Bayern

== Regierungsbezirk Unterfranken ==
=== Aschaffenburg ===
1. Schloss Johannisburg
2. Schloss Schönbusch

=== Würzburg ===
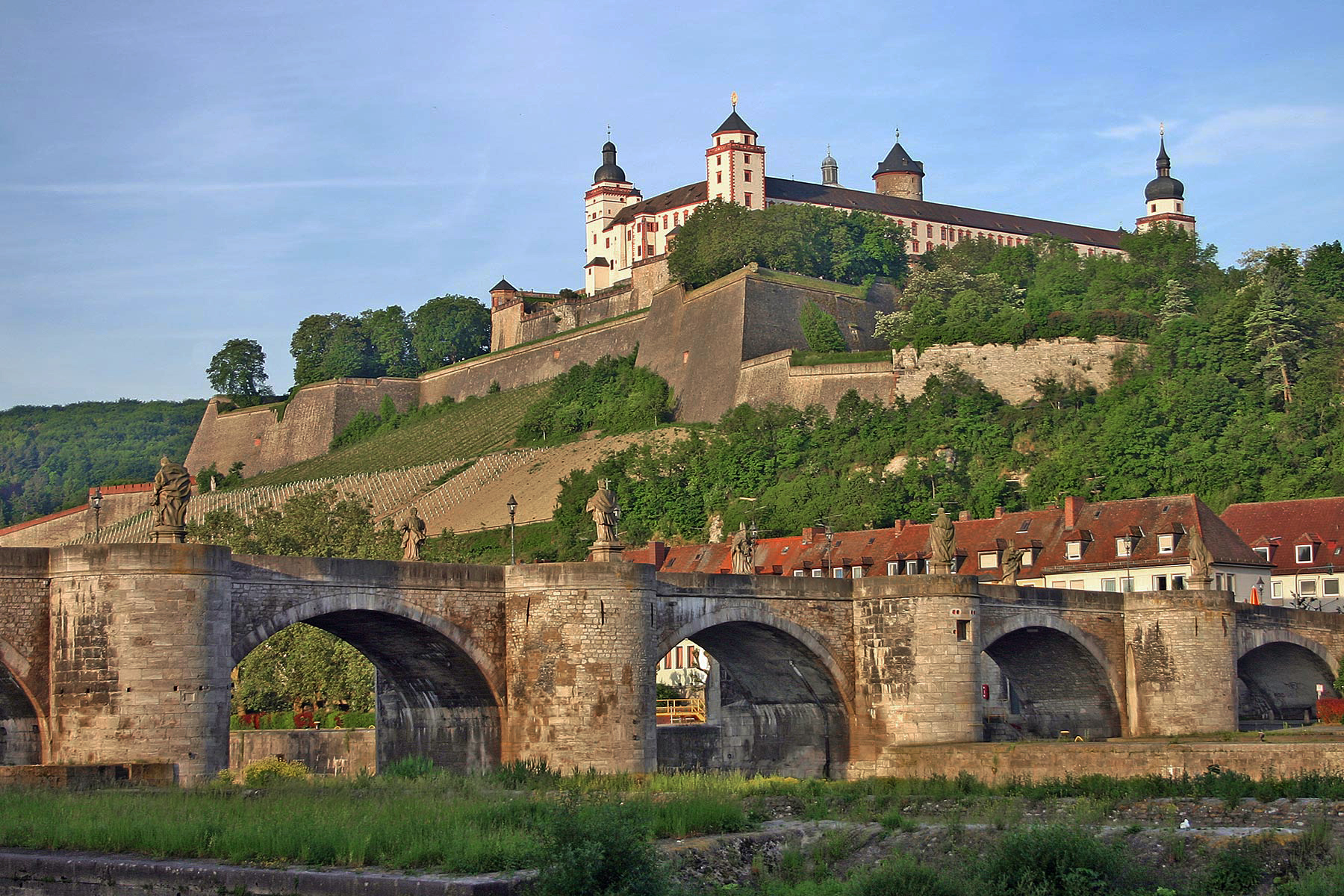
Marienberg and the old bridge

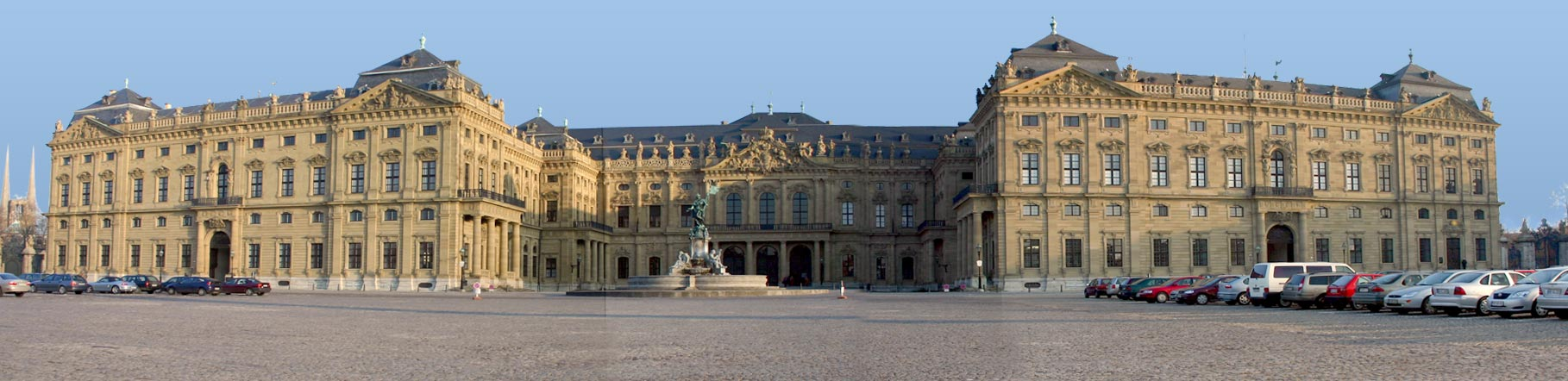
Würzburg Residenz

1. Feste Marienberg, Würzburg
2. Würzburger Residenz

=== Landkreis Aschaffenburg ===
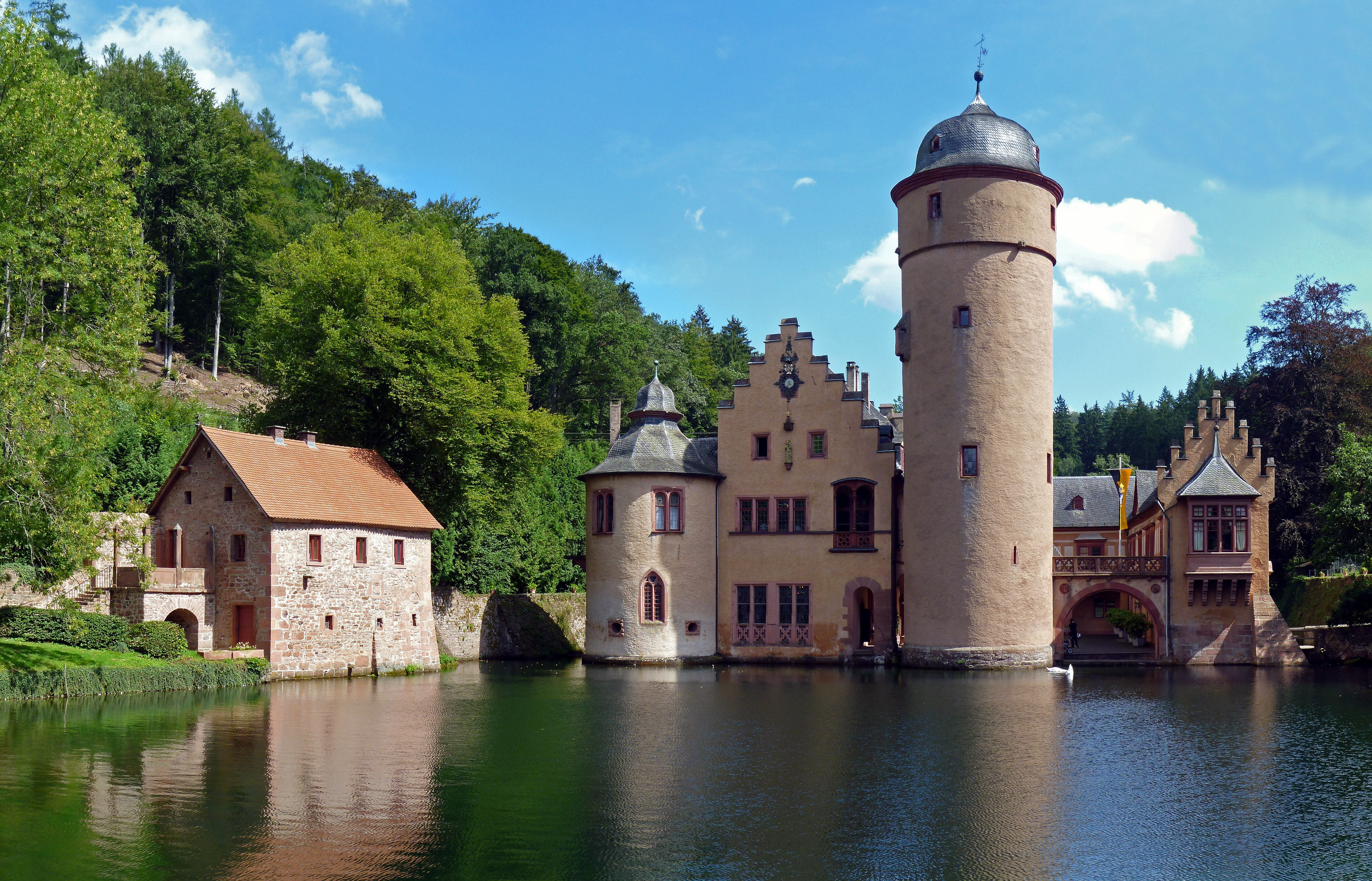
Mespelbrunn Castle

1. Burg Alzenau, Alzenau
2. Schloss Mespelbrunn, Mespelbrunn
3. Schloss Luitpoldshöhe, gemeindefreies Gebiet Rohrbrunner Forst

=== Landkreis Bad Kissingen ===
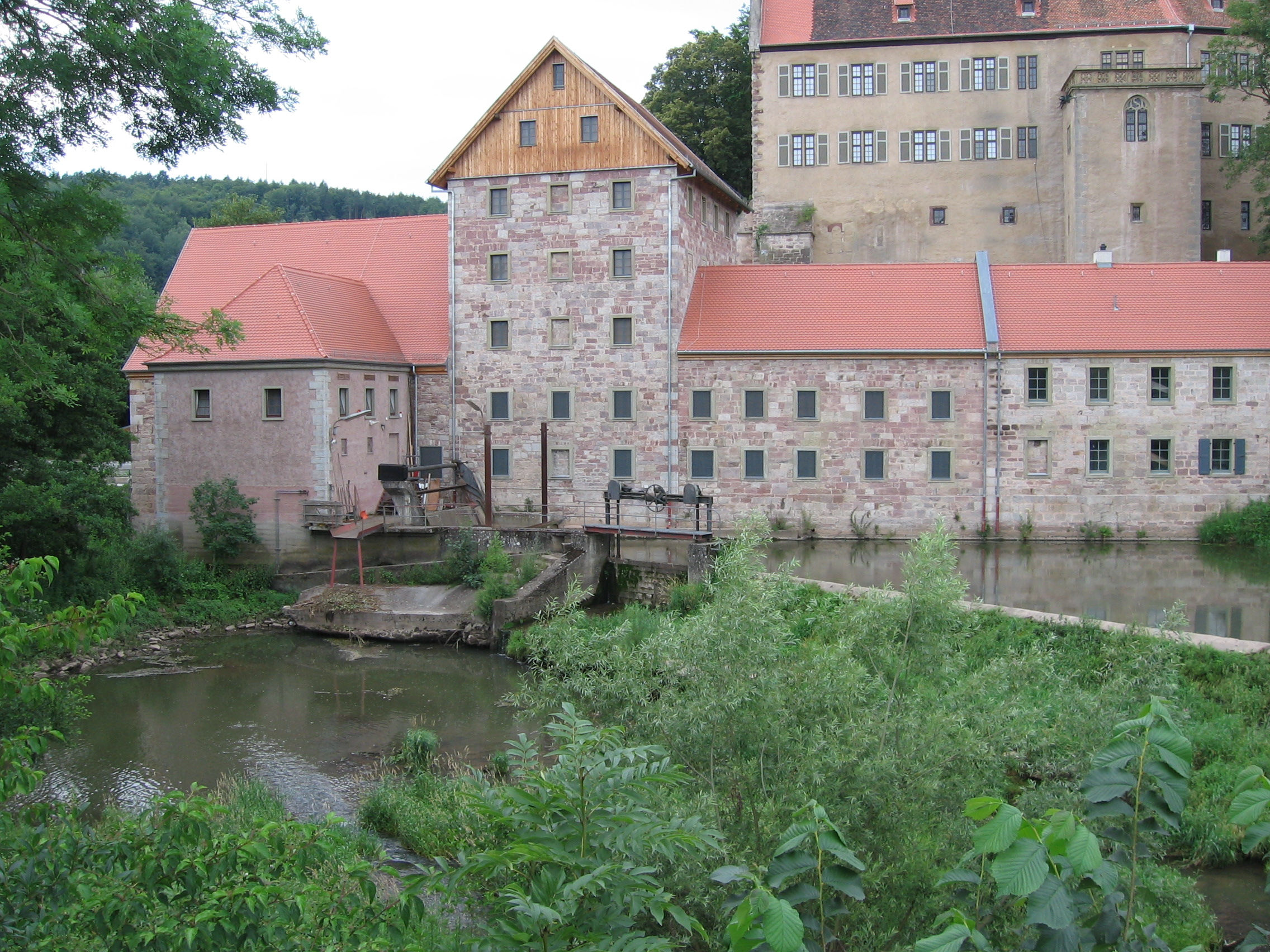
Schloss Aschach

1. Schloss Aschach, Bad Bocklet
2. Burgruine Botenlauben, Bad Kissingen
3. Kellereischloss, Hammelburg
4. Kirchenburg, Fuchsstadt
5. Burg Saaleck, Hammelburg
6. Burg Trimberg, Elfershausen

=== Landkreis Haßberge ===
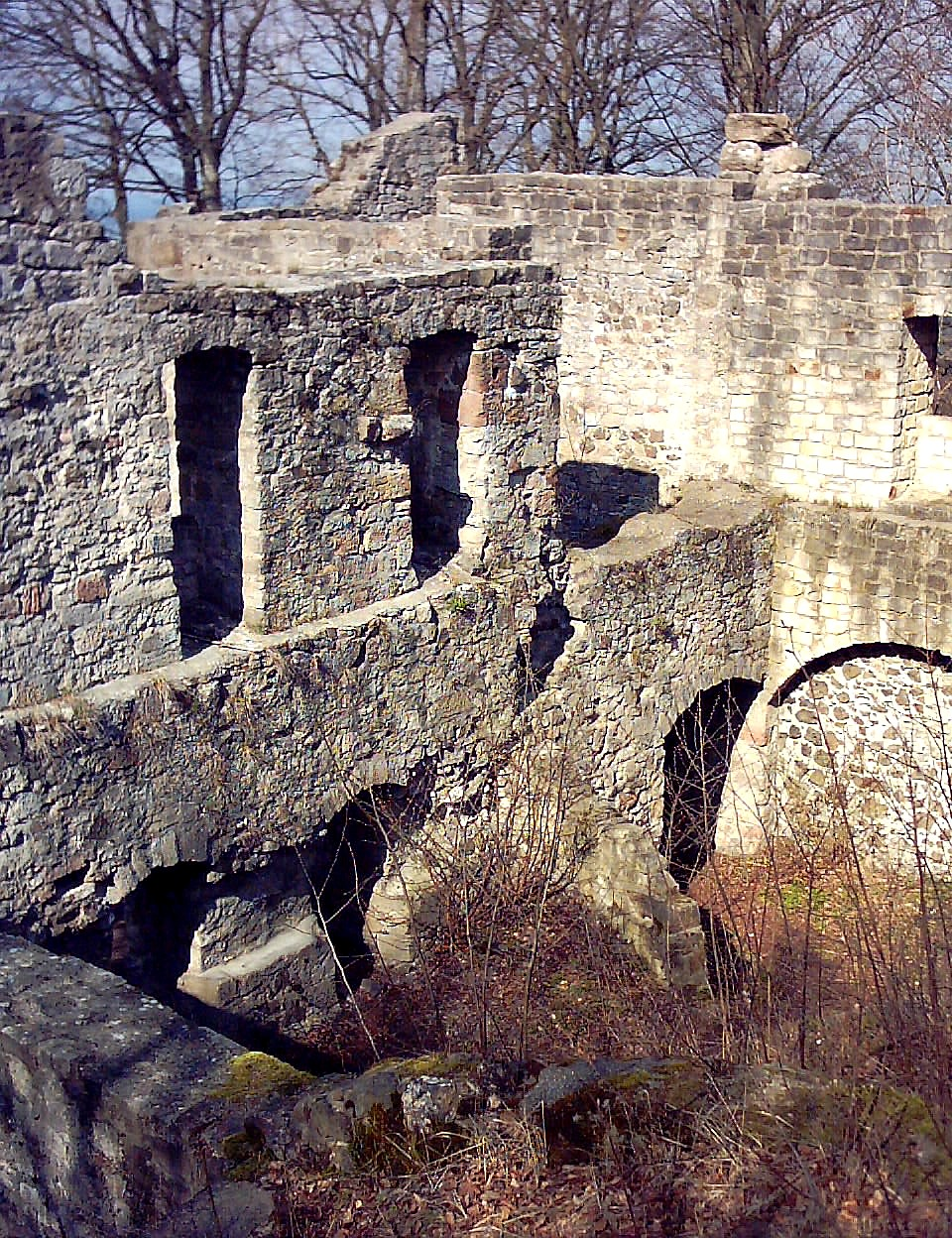
Burg Bramberg

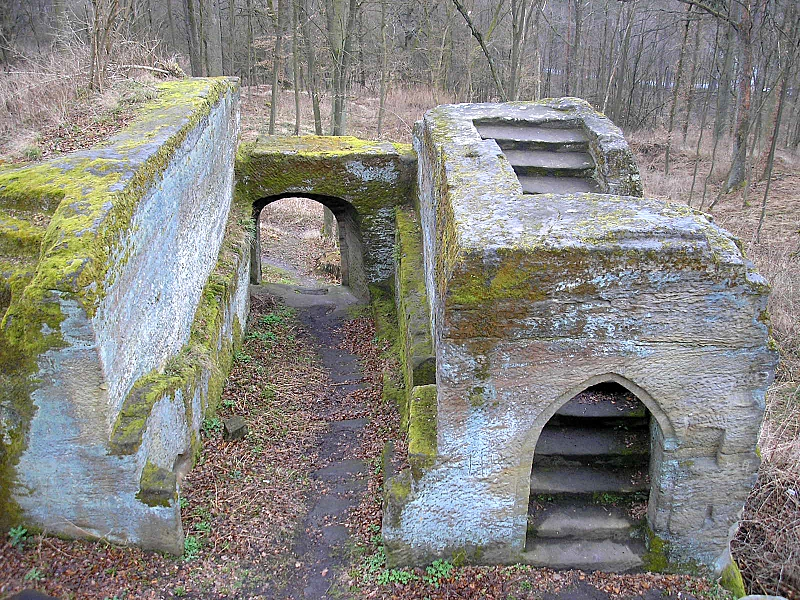
Burg Rotenhan

1. Altenstein Castle, Maroldsweisach
2. Bramberg Castle, Ebern
3. Schloss Eyrichshof, Ebern
4. Schloss Fischbach, Ebern
5. Konigsberg Castle, Königsberg in Bayern
6. Lichtenstein Castle, Pfarrweisach
7. Rauheneck Castle, Ebern
8. Rotenhan Castle, Ebern
9. Schmachtenberg Castle, Zeil am Main
10. Schloss Wonfurt, Wonfurt

=== Landkreis Kitzingen ===
1. Schloss Altenschönbach, Prichsenstadt
2. Johanniterkastell, Biebelried
3. Schloss Biebergau, Dettelbach
4. Schloss Bimbach, Prichsenstadt
5. Schloss Castell, Castell
6. Schloss Einersheim, Markt Einersheim
7. Schloss Friedrichsberg, Abtswind
8. Gräflich Schönborn'sches Schloss, Volkach
9. Schloss Fröhstockheim, Rödelsee
10. Schloss Mainsondheim, Dettelbach
11. Schloss Rödelsee, Rödelsee
12. Schloss Rüdenhausen, Rüdenhausen
13. Schloss Schwanberg, Rödelsee
14. Gräfliches Schloss Wiesentheid, Wiesentheid

=== Landkreis Main-Spessart ===
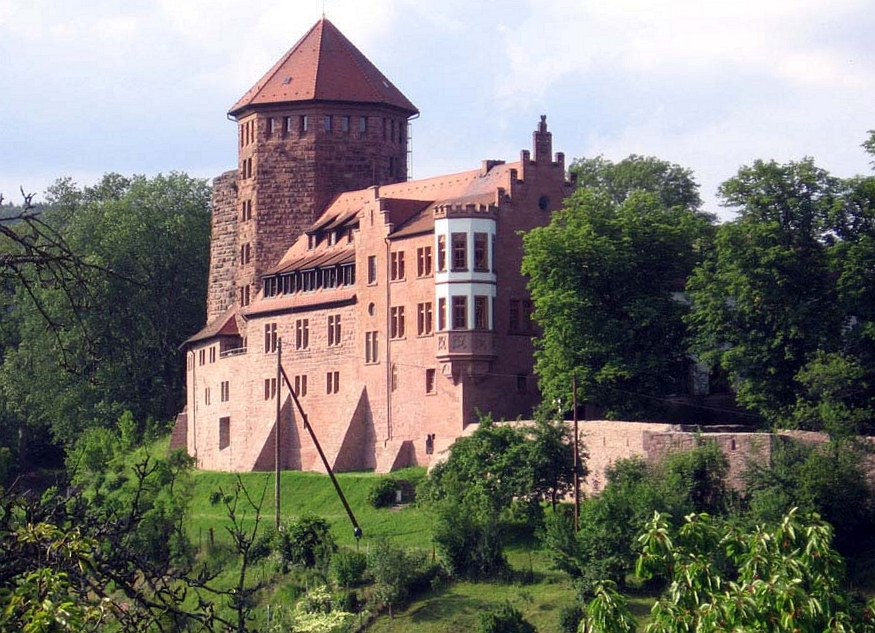
Rieneck Castle from a distance

1. Kirchenburg Aschfeld, Eußenheim
2. Schloss Büchold, Arnstein
3. Schloss Homburg, Triefenstein
4. Homburg, Gössenheim
5. Karlsburg, Karlstadt
6. Lohrer Schloss, Lohr am Main
7. Burg Rieneck, Rieneck
8. Schloss Rothenbuch, Rothenbuch
9. Burg Rothenfels, Rothenfels
10. Ruine Schönrain, Gemünden am Main
11. Schloss Weyberhöfe, Sailauf

=== Landkreis Miltenberg ===
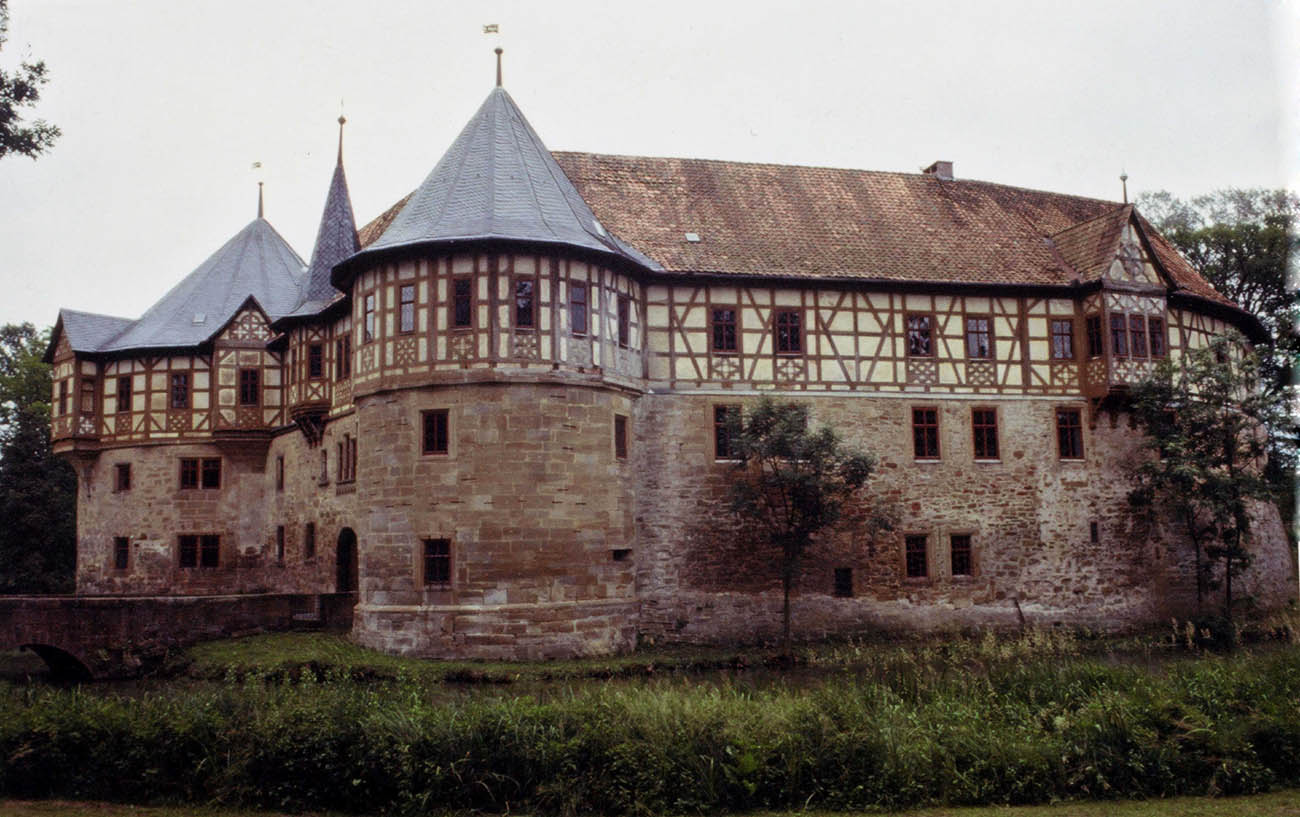
Irmelshausen

1. Schloss Amorbach, Amorbach
2. Clingenburg, Klingenberg am Main
3. Burg Collenberg, Collenberg
4. Henneburg, Stadtprozelten
5. Schloss Kleinheubach, Kleinheubach
6. Burg Laudenbach, Laudenbach
7. Mildenburg, Miltenberg
8. Burg Wildenberg, Kirchzell
9. Burg Wildenstein, Eschau

=== Landkreis Rhön-Grabfeld ===
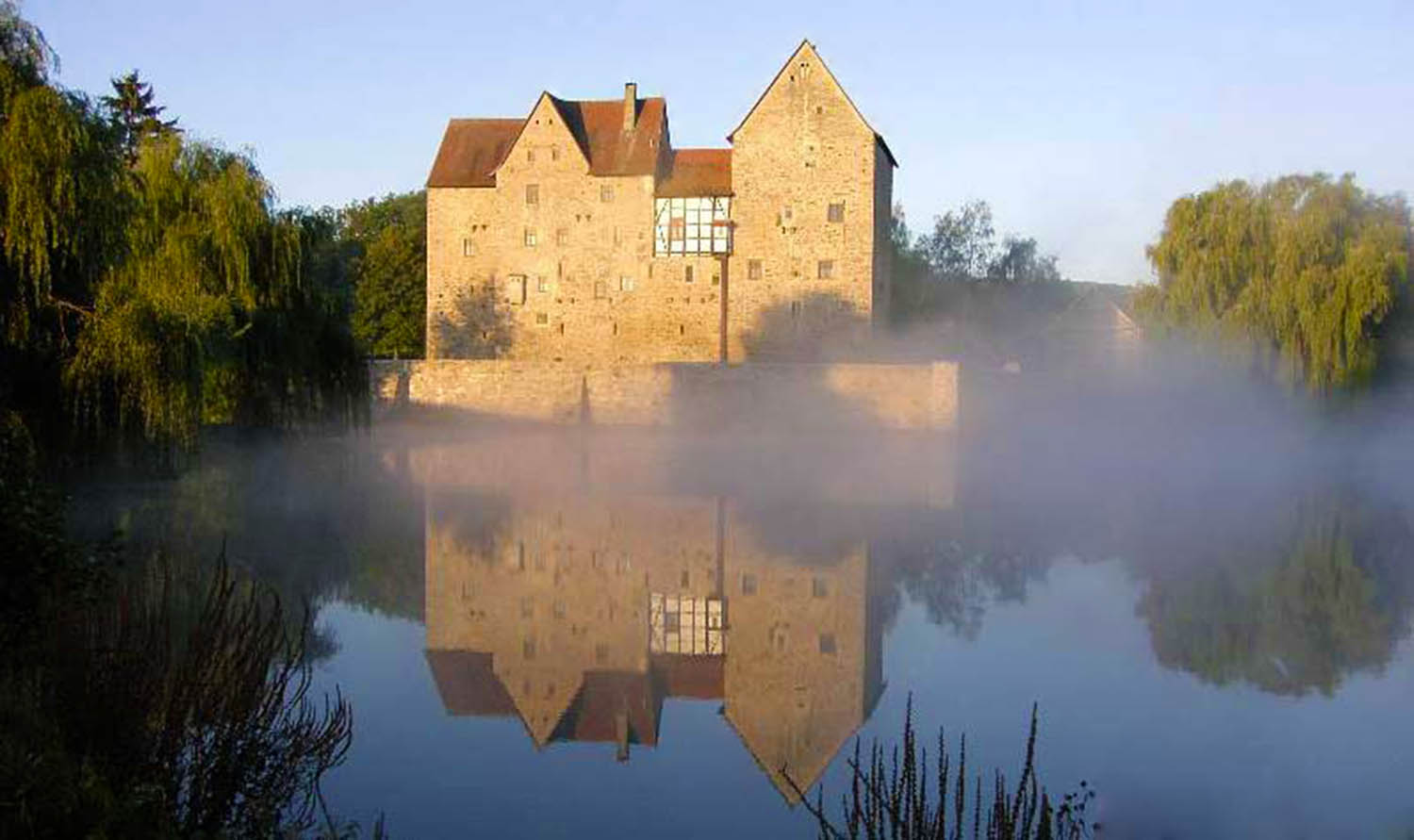
Brennhausen Castle, Franconia, Bavaria, Germany. View from the East.

1. Brennhausen Water Castle, Sulzdorf an der Lederhecke
2. Schloss Kleinbardorf, Kleinbardorf
3. Salzburg, Bad Neustadt an der Saale
4. Irmelshausen, Höchheim
5. Sternberg, Sulzdorf an der Lederhecke

=== Landkreis Schweinfurt ===
1. Schloss Vasbühl, Werneck
2. Schloss Werneck, Werneck
3. Zabelstein Castle, unincorporated area of Hundelshausen

=== Landkreis Würzburg ===
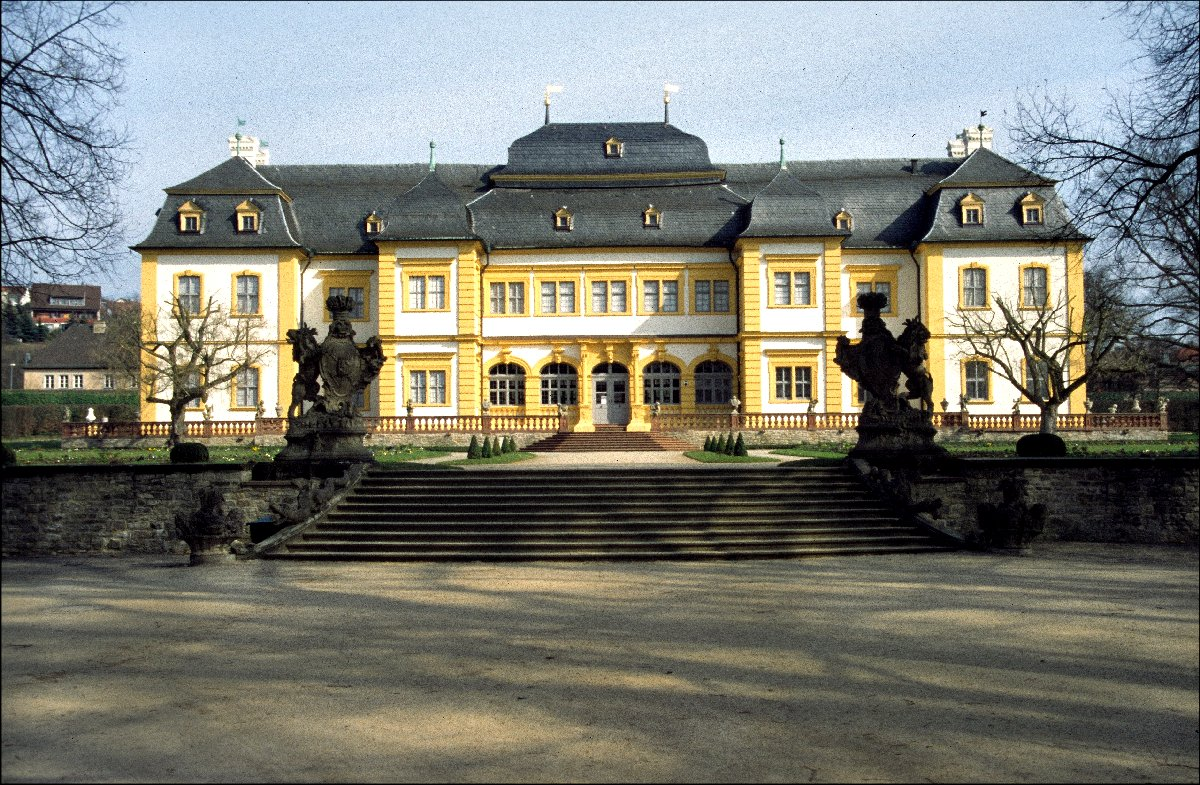
Schloss Veitshöchheim

1. Brattenstein Castle, Röttingen
2. Reichelsburg (ruins), Aub
3. Schloss Veitshöchheim, Veitshöchheim

== Regierungsbezirk Schwaben ==
=== Augsburg ===
1. Herrenhaus Bannacker, Augsburg (Bannacker)
2. Schloss Wellenburg, Augsburg (Wellenburg)

=== Kaufbeuren ===
1. Burgruine Kemnat

=== Kempten (Allgäu) ===
1. Burgruine Burghalde

=== Memmingen ===
1. Schloss Eisenburg
2. Schloss Grünenfurt
3. Schloss Illerfeld

=== Landkreis Aichach-Friedberg ===
1. Burgstall Bachern, Friedberg
2. Burgstall Klingenberg, Aichach-Oberwittelsbach
3. Schloss Friedberg, Friedberg
4. Wasserschloss Unterwittelsbach, Aichach-Unterwittelsbach
5. Burg Wittelsbach, Aichach-Oberwittelsbach

=== Landkreis Dillingen an der Donau ===
1. Schloss Altenberg, Syrgenstein
2. Schloss Bächingen, Bächingen an der Brenz
3. Schloss Bissingen, Bissingen
4. Bloßenstaufen Castle, Syrgenstein
5. Burgruine Bocksberg, Laugna
6. Schloss Dillingen, Dillingen an der Donau
7. Schloss Glött, Glött
8. Schloss Haunsheim, Haunsheim
9. Schloss Höchstädt, Höchstädt an der Donau
10. Burgruine Hohenburg, Bissingen
11. Schloss Kalteneck, Schwenningen
12. Schloss Lauingen, Lauingen (Donau)
13. Schloss Oberbechingen, Oberbechingen
14. Schloss Schlachtegg, Gundelfingen an der Donau
15. Schloss Staufen, Syrgenstein
16. Schloss Wertingen, Wertingen

=== Landkreis Donau-Ries ===
1. Burgruine Alerheim, Alerheim
2. Schloss Amerdingen, Amerdingen
3. Schloss Genderkingen, Genderkingen
4. Burg Gosheim in Gosheim, Gemeinde Huisheim, Reste der Burganlage in der Friedhofsmauer und Pfarrkirche
5. Burgruine Graisbach in Graisbach, Gemeinde Marxheim
6. Burg Harburg, Harburg (Schwaben)
7. Altes Schloss Hemerten in Hemerten, Gemeinde Münster
8. Neues Schloss Hemerten in Hemerten, Gemeinde Münster
9. Schloss Hirschbrunn in Hirschbrunn, Gemeinde Auhausen
10. Schloss Hochaltingen in Hochaltingen, Gemeinde Fremdingen
11. Burgruine Hochhaus near Karlshof, Gemeinde Hohenaltheim
12. Schloss Hohenaltheim, Hohenaltheim
13. Schloss Kleinerdlingen in Kleinerdlingen, Stadt Nördlingen, ehem. Johanniterschloss
14. Schloss Leitheim in Leitheim, Markt Kaisheim
15. Schloss Lierheim in Lierheim, Gemeinde Möttingen, ehem. Deutschordensschloss
16. Schloss Monheim, Monheim
17. Burg Niederhaus in Niederhaus, Ederheim
18. Schloss Oberndorf, Oberndorf am Lech
19. Schloss Otting, Otting
20. Schloss Oettingen, Oettingen in Bayern
21. Altes Schloss Rain, Rain
22. Schloss Reimlingen, Reimlingen, former Teutonic Knights' castle
23. Schloss Schweinspoint in Schweinspoint, Gemeinde Marxheim
24. Burgruine Steinhart in Steinhart, Gemeinde Hainsfarth
25. Schloss Tagmersheim, Tagmersheim
26. Schloss Tapfheim, Tapfheim
27. Burgstall Thurneck in Thurneck, Gemeinde Mönchsdeggingen
28. Altes Schloss Wallerstein, Wallerstein, remains of the site, viewing point
29. Moritzschlösschen Wallerstein, Wallerstein
30. Neues Schloss Wallerstein, Wallerstein
31. Wellwart (Wöllwarth), Harburg (Schwaben), remains of a motte-and-bailey castle

=== Landkreis Günzburg ===
1. Schloss Autenried, Ichenhausen
2. Schloss Burgau, Burgau
3. Schloss Burtenbach, Burtenbach
4. Schloss Eberstall, Jettingen-Scheppach
5. Schloss Edelstetten, Neuburg an der Kammel
6. Schloss Großkötz, Kötz
7. Schloss Günzburg, Günzburg
8. Schloss Haldenwang, Haldenwang
9. Oberes Schloss Ichenhausen, Ichenhausen
10. Unteres Schloss Ichenhausen, Ichenhausen
11. Schloss Jettingen, Jettingen-Scheppach
12. Schloss Kleinkötz, Kötz
13. Schloss Klingenburg, Jettingen-Scheppach
14. Schloss Krumbach, Krumbach (Schwaben)
15. ehemaliges Schloss Landstrost, Offingen
16. Schloss Leipheim, Leipheim
17. Schloss Neuburg, Neuburg an der Kammel
18. Schloss Niederraunau, Krumbach (Schwaben)
19. Burg Reisensburg, Günzburg
20. Schloss Seifriedsberg, Ziemetshausen
21. Schloss Unterknöringen, Burgau
22. Schloss Waldstetten, Waldstetten

=== Landkreis Neu-Ulm ===
1. Schloss Beuren, Pfaffenhofen an der Roth
2. Schloss Hausen, Neu-Ulm
3. Schloss Illereichen, Altenstadt
4. Schloss Illertissen (so-called Vöhlinschloss), Illertissen
5. Schloss Neubronn, Neu-Ulm
6. Burgruine Neuhausen, Holzheim
7. Schloss Obenhausen, Buch
8. Schloss Osterberg, Osterberg
9. Schloss Reutti, Neu-Ulm
10. Altes Schloss Weißenhorn (so-called Fuggerschloss), Weißenhorn
11. Neues Schloss Weißenhorn (so-called Rechbergschloss or even Neuffenschloss), Weißenhorn

=== Landkreis Ostallgäu ===
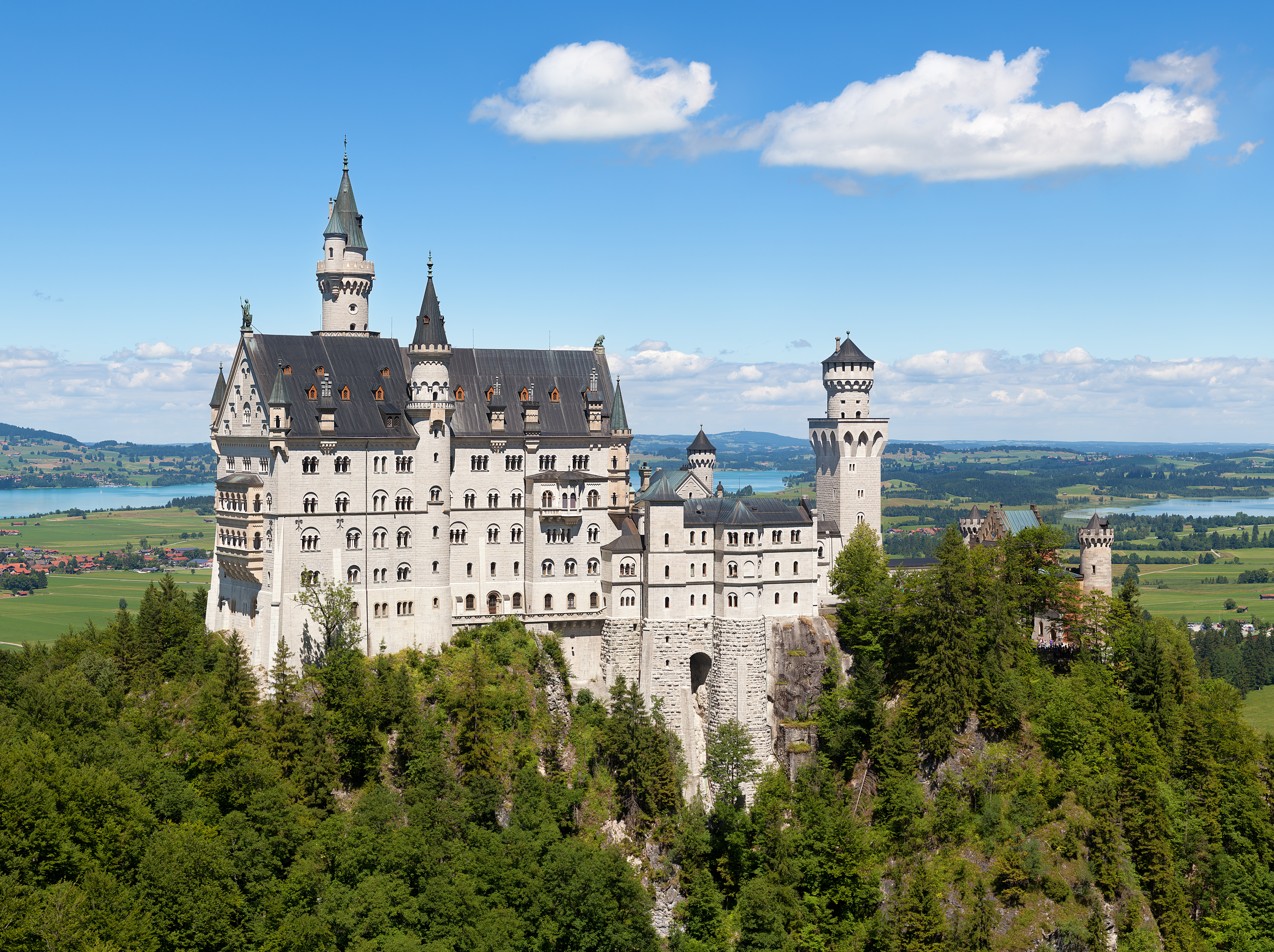
Neuschwanstein Castle

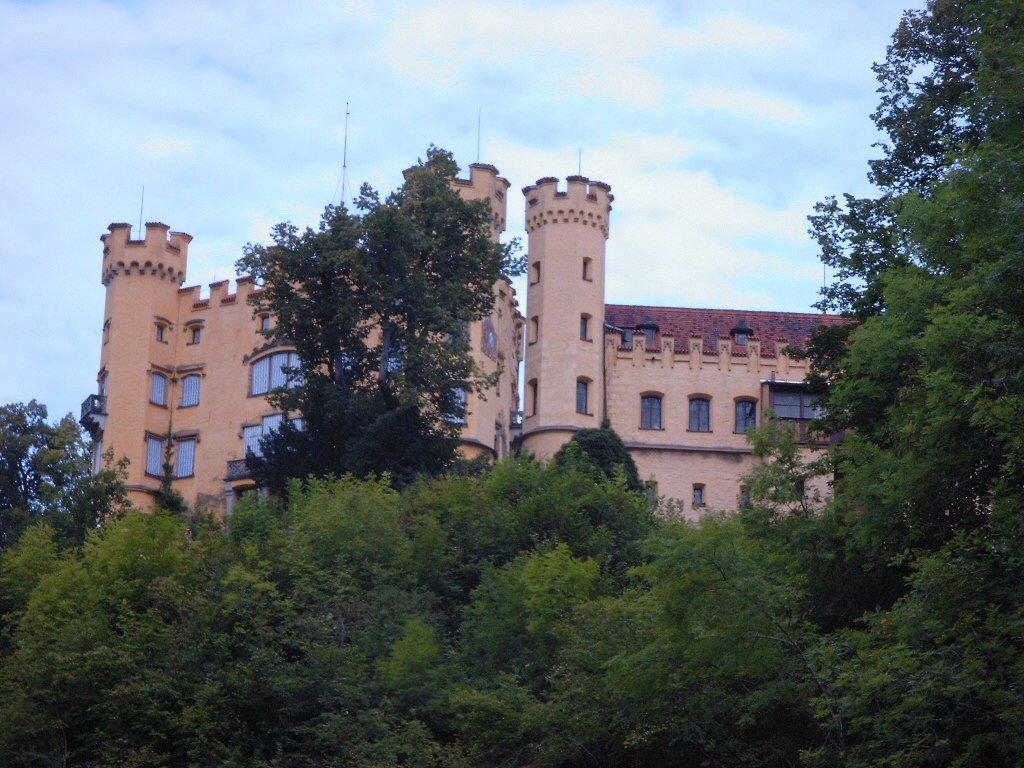
Schloss Hohenschwangau

1. Alt-Trauchburg Castle, Weitnau
2. Schloss Bullachberg, Schwangau
3. Eisenberg Castle, Eisenberg
4. Falkenstein Castle, Pfronten
5. Schloss Günzach, Günzach
6. Helmishofen Castle, Kaltental
7. Hohenfreyberg Castle, Eisenberg
8. Schloss Hohenschwangau, Schwangau
9. Hohes Schloss, Füssen
10. Schloss Hopferau, Hopferau
11. Schloss Lamerdingen, Lamerdingen
12. Schloss Marktoberdorf, Marktoberdorf
13. Nesselburg Castle, Nesselwang
14. Schloss Neuschwanstein, Schwangau
15. Schloss Osterzell, Osterzell
16. Schloss Unterthingau, Unterthingau
17. Schloss Waal, Waal
18. Schloss Weizern, Hopferau

=== Landkreis Unterallgäu ===
1. Schloss (Bürgermeister-Rabus-Straße 5), Memmingerberg
2. Schloss (so called Rotes Schlößle, Am Roten Schlößle 2), Memmingerberg
3. Schloss (so called Wachterschlößle, Benninger Straße 8), Memmingerberg
4. Altenschönegg Castle, Oberschönegg
5. Schloss Babenhausen, Babenhausen
6. Schloss Bedernau, Breitenbrunn
7. Fuggerschloss Boos, Boos
8. Schloss Fellheim, Fellheim
9. Schloss Frickenhausen, Lauben
10. Schloss Grönenbach, Bad Grönenbach
11. Unteres Schloss Grönenbach, Bad Grönenbach
12. Schloss Holzgünz, Holzgünz
13. Schloss Kirchheim, Kirchheim in Schwaben
14. Schloss Kronburg, Kronburg
15. Schloss Künersberg, Memmingerberg
16. Neues Schloss Lautrach, Lautrach
17. Schloss Markt Wald, Markt Wald
18. Schloss Mattsies, Tussenhausen
19. Schloss Mindelburg, Mindelheim
20. Burgruine Rothenstein, Bad Grönenbach
21. Schloss Trunkelsberg, Trunkelsberg
22. Schloss Türkheim, Türkheim
23. Schloss Ungerhausen, Ungerhausen

== See also ==
- List of castles
- List of castles in Germany
