= Zabelstein =

Mountain in Bavaria, Germany

Coordinates: 49°57′N 10°27′E

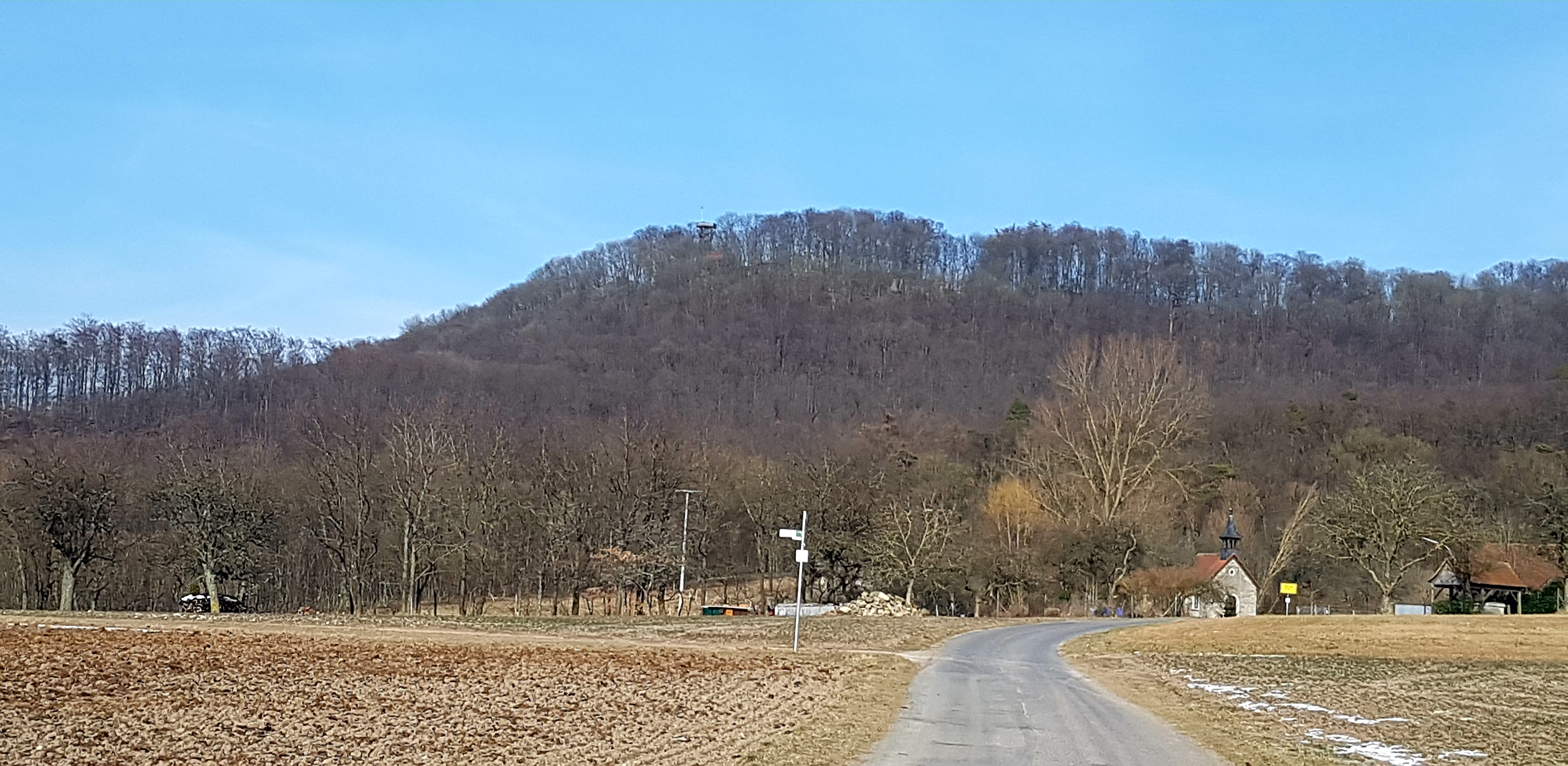

Highest point
- Elevation: 489 m (1,604 ft)

Geography
- Location: Bavaria, Germany

Zabelstein is a mountain of Bavaria, Germany.
