= Breitenlohe =

Coordinates: 49.714°N 10.608°E

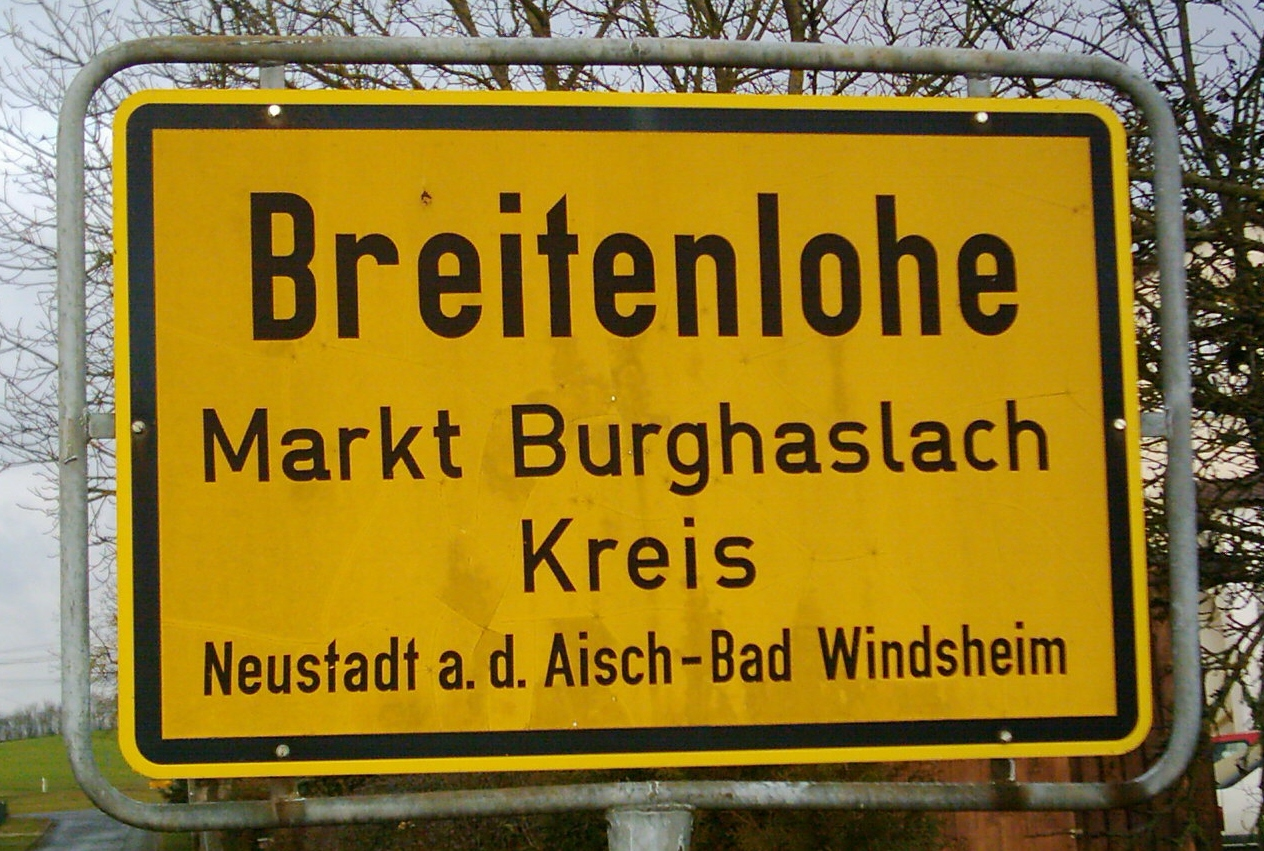

Breitenlohe is a part of the city Burghaslach, Bavaria, Germany. Breitenlohe has about 100 inhabitants and is part of the administrative district Landkreis Neustadt an der Aisch-Bad Windsheim.

== Castle ==
Well known is the castle from the 16th century. It was originally a moated castle, but the moat is dry. It has six towers, in two of them are staircases. Before the castle was built in 1569, there was already a kind of castle in the same place. The first castle was built in 1340 for Albrecht von Hohenlohe and later sold to the Family von Vestenberg, who renovated the castle and later rebuilt it. The castle is not open to the public.

== Church ==
Close to the castle is the Catholic church of Exaltatio S. Crucis, also built in the 16th century.

== Breitenlohe Personalities ==
- Nicholas Schlee (1836–1914)|Masterbrewer and Successful Businessman. A prominent brewer in USA that grew his brewery into the third largest brewery in Columbus, Ohio. He built a mansion about 1865; since 1927 this mansion has been the clubhouse of the Germania Singing and Sport Society of Columbus Ohio. When Schlee died, his obituary noted a net worth of $3 million, or about $90 million in 2023 dollars.

== Social life ==
Breitenlohe has an auxiliary fire brigade.

== Literature ==
- Natascha Meuser: Schloss Breitenlohe: Architektur und Baugeschichte, DOM publishers, Berlin 2014, ISBN 978-3-86922-361-2.
