= Köschinger Bach =

River in Germany

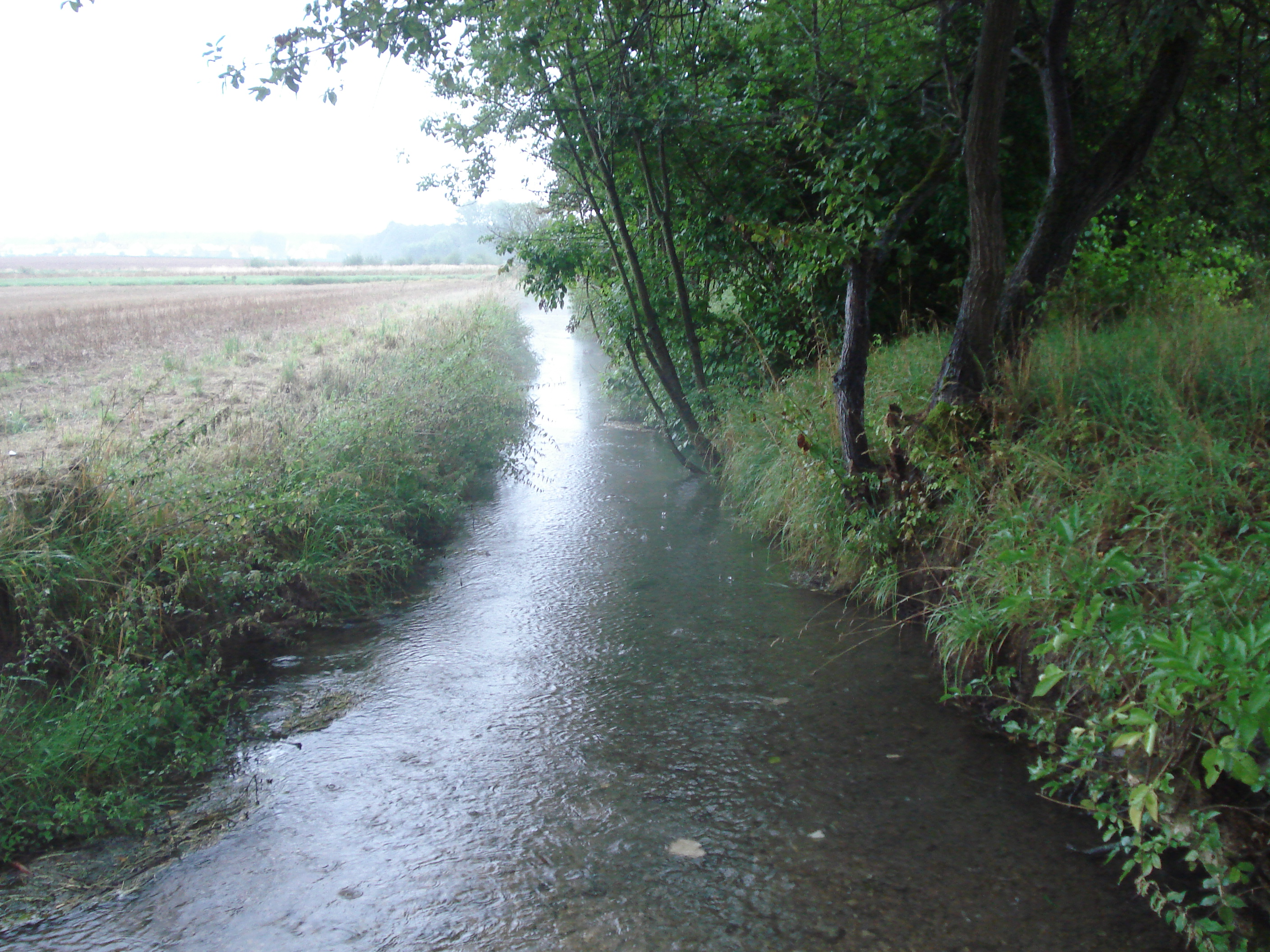
- The Köschinger Bach shortly after its source

Location
- Country: Germany
- State: Bavaria

Physical characteristics
- Mouth
  - location: Mailinger Bach
  - coordinates: 48.7605°N 11.5218°E
- Length: 10.9 km (6.8 mi)

Basin features
- Progression: Mailinger Bach→ Danube→ Black Sea

Köschinger Bach is a river in Bavaria, Germany. It originates from the karst spring Brunnhauptner Weiher, near Kösching. The river flows through the town centre before travelling through Desching and Großmehring. It then flows into the Mailinger Bach near Großmehring.

== See also ==
- List of rivers of Bavaria
