= Eitensheim =

- Municipality
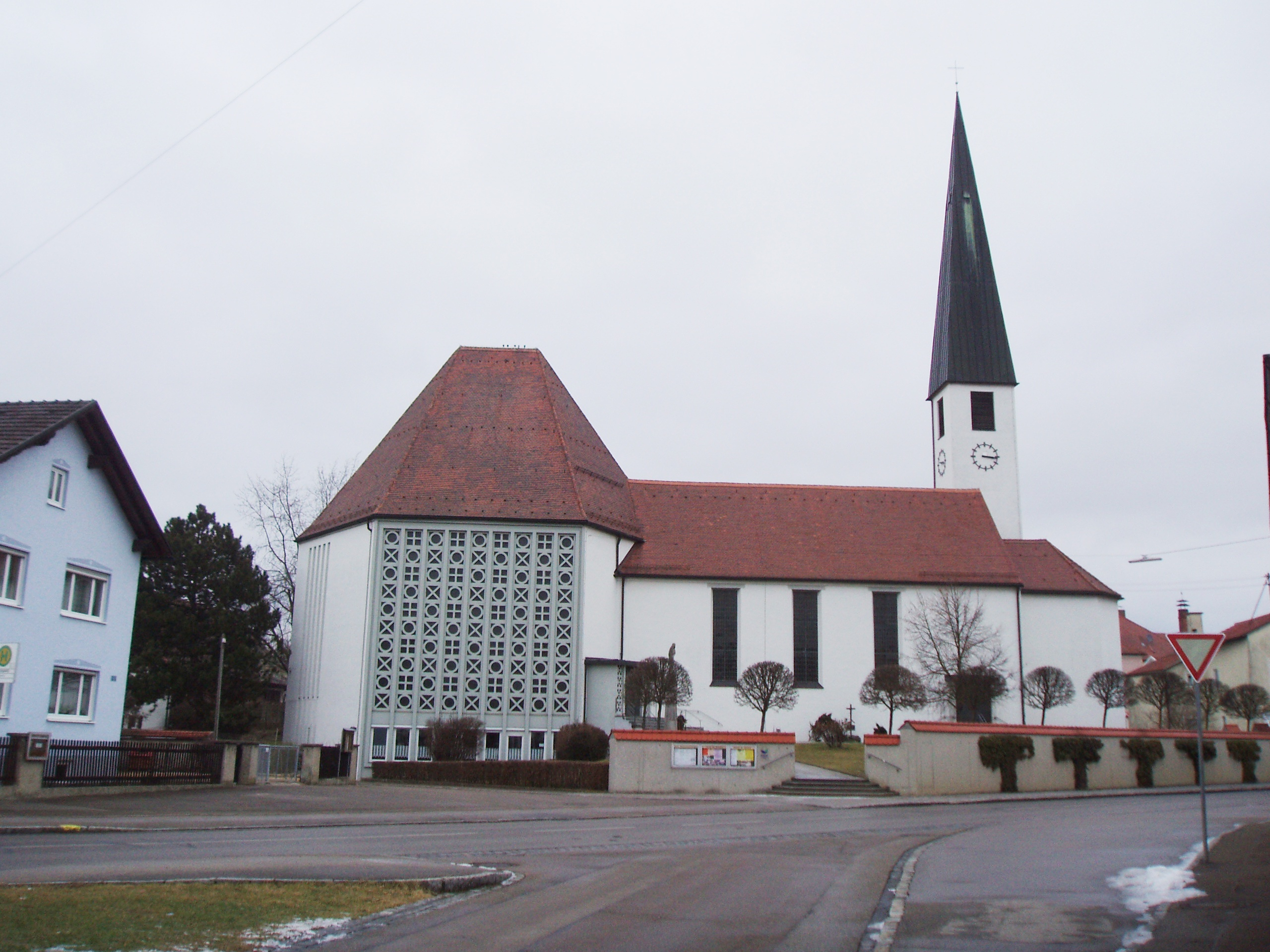
- Church of Saint Andrew

- Coat of arms

- Location of Eitensheim within Eichstätt district
- Interactive map of Eitensheim
- Location within Germany Location within Bavaria
- Coordinates: 48°49′N 11°19′E
- Country: Germany
- State: Bavaria
- Admin. region: Oberbayern
- District: Eichstätt
- Municipal assoc.: Eitensheim

Government
  - Mayor (2020–26): Manfred Diepold (CSU)

Area
  - Total: 15.72 km^{2} (6.07 sq mi)
- Elevation: 403 m (1,322 ft)

Population (2025-12-31)
  - Total: 3,030
  - Density: 193/km^{2} (499/sq mi)
- Time zone: UTC+01:00 (CET)
  - Summer (DST): UTC+02:00 (CEST)
- Postal codes: 85117
- Dialling codes: 08458
- Vehicle registration: EI
- Website: www.eitensheim.de

Eitensheim is a municipality in the district of Eichstätt (district) in Bavaria in Germany.

== Geography ==
Eitensheim is located between Eichstätt and Ingolstadt, in Altmühl Valley Nature Park.

=== Neighbouring communes ===
Following cities and communes are bordered on the commune Eitensheim: Hitzhofen, Lippertshofen, Gaimersheim, Friedrichshofen, Buxheim and Tauberfeld.

== Interpretation of the name ==
The oldest name of the Eitensheim had been "Itensheim". This means "Home of the Itis", a noble and dignified woman.

== History ==
In a district of Eitensheim, called "Breitenstückl", the grave of a man was found in 1998 – a farmer and who had died 7000 years before. Relicts which were also found there, are still 1000 years older. Moreover, there were also findings from the Bronze Age, Hallstatt and La Tène period. Roman settlement was proved at the "Sebastianskapelle" and in the southeast of Eitensheim; grave mounds exist and there had been a villa rustica in the south of Eitensheim as well.

Eitensheim, lying at the Roman trade street, belonged in the 8th century to the founded bishopric of Eichstätt as a basic village together with Möckenlohe, Buxheim and Adelschlag. In 908 "Itensheim" had been first mentioned in the document of King Ludwig IV for the bishop of Eichstätt, called Erchanbald. Since then Eitensheim had been closely connected to the chapter of Eichstätt. In 1179, and again in 1186, two-thirds of the taxes of "Itensheim" had been confirmed to the chapter Eichstätt. The first lord of the village had been mentioned as ministerial of Eichstätt in 1122. After a conflict Eitensheim had been adjudged completely to Eichstätt in 1305. In the year 1460 Eitensheim was plundered by Ludwig the Rich during his war against the Earl of Ansbach and the Bishop of Eichstätt.

At the end of the Holy Roman Empire the village consisted of 101 estates, most of them rural. After implementation of feeding, the number of animals had increased strongly in the princedom Eichstätt. In the 1790s, there had been only 350–400 horned cattle in Eitensheim. Approximately 60 farms had to pay taxes to an office in Eichstätt and 5 farms had to pay taxes to the chapter of Eichstätt. Therefore, the different farms had to pay separately, but there was also a church, a manse, an early mass house, a school and other kinds of buildings.

In 1802 Eitensheim had come to the grand duke Ferdinand of Toscana. In the new Kingdom Bavaria at 1806, there lived 546 persons, it had built an own assessment area and had been allocated to the provincial court Eichstätt since 1808/10. In 1817 Eitensheim was allocated to the provincial court Ingolstadt and in 1818 Eitensheim had become an independent commune with 124 families. Since 1868 Eitensheim, lying on the railway track Ingolstadt–Treuchtlingen, has had its own stop. Today 180–200 trains run every day.

In 1954 a central supply of water was installed and 1971 sewage was built. Two years before, in 1969, a school with gym was constructed, with part as primary school and part as secondary school. Nowadays it is only a primary school and a new gym has been built.

Till the year 1972 Eitensheim had belonged to the rural district of Ingolstadt, now it belongs to Eichstätt.

Moreover, Eitensheim builds an association of administrations together with Böhmfeld located in Eitensheim.

== Politics ==
=== Council ===
The council of Eitensheim consists of 15 members:

- CSU 6 seats
- SPD 3 seats
- Freie Wählergemeinschaft 4 seats

Status of 28 October 2014

=== Mayors ===
The mayors of Eitensheim since 1876:

- 1876–1895: Willibald Dier
- 1895–1905: Sebastian Trini
- 1905–1924: Anton Wagner
- 1924–1933: Josef Knörr
- 1933–1946: Andreas Bauer
- 1946–1948: Ludwig Bernecker
- 1948–1966: Andreas Meyer
- 1966–1978: Franz Bernecker
- 1978–1990: Dr. Günter Lachnit
- 1990–2002: Josef Funk
- 2002–2020: Michael Stampfer
- since 2020: Manfred Diepold

=== Coat of Arms ===
The coat of arms consists of a silver chief with a blue "Andreaskreuz" and a golden lion. The lion had been adopted from the emblem of the chapter Eichstätt. The "Andreaskreuz" should symbolize the patron of the church Saint Andreas. The commune had accepted this coat of arms on 8 February 1983.

== Culture and sights ==
=== Churches ===
• "Catholic Parish Church St. Andreas": Between 1182 and 1196 the bishop of Eichstätt had consecrated a church in "Itensheim". In 1499 there was a bigger structural change, because of the indulgence grant. Franz Xaver Horneis structured the ceiling new in 1742. But the building of this church was cancelled and was replaced with a neo-Gothic building, which was consecrated in 1867. Because of the annex to the existing building in the west and a completely new constructed nave, the present day sacral building was built from 1959 to 1961 after the plans of the architect Luwig Geith. At 8 December 1959 there was a fire in the neighbourhood and the church spire was damaged. This church spire was rebuilt and, because of the lean format with a copped ending, it is called the pen of God.

• "Catholic St. Salvator Chapel": This chapel has been rebuilt in 1589/90 and is nowadays the cemetery chapel with a steep roof. Before the chapel was a pilgrimage church which sheltered a special painting. The original painting on ceilings and walls is now varnished.

• "Catholic St. Sebastian Chapel": This chapel on the fields outside Eitensheim has a steeple built in 1713. It shelters a wooden sculpture of the Marien coronation from the second half of the 16th century.

• "Three sacred crosses": Firstly mentioned in 1602 and noted again in 1722. These crosses are a legendary monument near Federal Highway 13 and there are still marks of a pilgrimage church.

=== Museums ===
- Museum of Local History, Eitensheim

=== Music ===
- male choir
- mixed church chorus

=== Sport ===
- SV Eitensheim (7 departments: Soccer, Tennis, tabletennis, Volleyball, Gymnastics, Jujitsu, Bowling)
- Schützomania Eitensheim (Carnival dance group)
- Shooting Club "Orient" Eitensheim

=== Regular events ===
- March: Stout Event
- July: Village Party, Fire for religious cause
- August: Delacha Event
- November: Hoagarten, Christmas Market
- Dezember: Advent singing

== Literature ==
- Andreas Hirsch: Eitensheim. Edited by commune Eitensheim. Eitensheim 2000.
- Gerhard Hirschmann: Historischer Atlas von Bayern. Part Franken. Row I, Issue 6. Eichstätt. Beilngries-Eichstätt-Greding. Munich 1959.
- Hubert Freilinger: Historischer Atlas von Bayern. Part Altbayern. Ingolstadt. Munich 1977.
- Der Eichstätter Raum in Geschichte und Gegenwart. 2nd extended version, Eichstätt 1984.
