= Irschinger Ach =

River in Germany

Location
- Country: Germany
- State: Bavaria

Physical characteristics
- Mouth
  - location: Wellenbach
  - coordinates: 48.7591°N 11.6039°E
- Length: 20.9 km (13.0 mi)

Basin features
- Progression: Wellenbach→ Kleine Donau→ Danube→ Black Sea

The Irschinger Ach (in its upper course: Kühpicklgraben, in its middle course: Westenhauser Ach) is a river in Bavaria, Germany. It flows into the Wellenbach near Vohburg.

== See also ==
- List of rivers of Bavaria
