= Pfünz Roman Fort =

Roman cohort camp in Germany

Pfünz Roman Fort Kastell Pfünz
- Alternative name: Vetoniana
- Limes: ORL 73 (RLK)
- Section (RLK): Rhaetian Limes, Section 14
- Date(s) occupied: c. 90 A. D. to c. 230, 233/234 or c. 240 A. D.
- Type: Cohort camp
- Unit/Formation: Cohors I Breucorum equitata civium Romanorum
- Size: max. 189 (187) × 145 (144) m (= 2,5 ha)
- Construction: a) wood-earth b) stone
- Condition: Defensive wall uncovered in places and partially conserved; ditches and road bed to the south clearly visible.
- Location: Walting-Pfünz
- Coordinates: 48.88389°N 11.26389°E
- Height: 425 m
- Previous fort: Weißenburg Roman Fort (northwest); Burgsalach Watchtower (northwest)
- Following fort: Kösching Roman Fort (east-southeast)
- Fort in front: Petersbuch Roman Fortlet (northwest); Biebig Roman Fortlet (north); Hegelohe Roman Fortlet (north); ORL 73a: Böhming Roman Fort (northeast); Güßgraben Roman Fortlet east-northeast

Pfünz Roman Fort (German: Kastell Pfünz), Castra Vetoniana or Vetonianae, was a Roman cohort camp near Pfünz, a village in the municipality of Walting in the county of Eichstätt, Bavaria. It was built in about 90 A. D. on a 42-metre-high Jurassic hillspur between the valley of the Altmühl and that of the Pfünzer Bach stream. it is a component of the Rhaetian Limes which was elevated in 2005 to the status of a UNESCO World Heritage Site. Of historical importance are the remains of the double V-shaped ditches hewn out of the rock in front of the position, the one on the western rampart being the best preserved. In 1998, as part of the construction of a high pressure water system, the Bavarian State Office for Monument Protection carried out further test excavations. The archaeological record and rich finds from Pfünz, some of which are very rare, are seen as reasons for further studies in the future.

== Literature ==
=== General ===
- Dietwulf Baatz: Der Römische Limes. Archäologische Ausflüge zwischen Rhein und Donau. 4th edition, Gebr. Mann, Berlin, 2000, ISBN 3-7861-2347-0, p. 308 ff.
- Thomas Fischer, Erika Riedmeier-Fischer: Der römische Limes in Bayern. Pustet, Regensburg, 2008. ISBN 978-3-7917-2120-0.
- Thomas Fischer in: Wolfgang Czysz including: Die Römer in Bayern. Nikol, Hamburg, 2005, ISBN 3-937872-11-6, pp. 500 ff.
- Thomas Fischer: Kastelle Ruffenhofen, Dambach, Unterschwaningen, Gnotzheim, Gunzenhausen, Theilenhofen, Böhming, Pfünz, Eining. In: Jochen Garbsch (ed.): Der römische Limes in Bayern. 100 Jahre Limesforschung in Bayern. Ausstellungskataloge der Prähistorischen Staatssammlung 22, 1992, pp. 37 ff.
- Günter Ulbert, Thomas Fischer: Der Limes in Bayern. Theiss, Stuttgart, 1983, ISBN 3-8062-0351-2, pp. 94 ff.

=== Individual studies ===
- Dietwulf Baatz: Groma oder Modius? Zu einem Fund aus dem Limeskastell Pfünz. Bayerische Vorgeschichtsblätter 59, pp. 73–83, Beck, Munich, 1994.
- Wolfgang Czysz: Eine Töpferei von Terra-Sigillata- Gefäßen bei Schwabegg, Landkreis Augsburg, Schwaben. In: Das Archäologische Jahr in Bayern, 1980.
- Jörg Fassbinder: Neue Ergebnisse der geophysikalischen Prospektion am Obergermanisch-Raetischen Limes. In: Andreas Thiel (ed.): Neue Forschungen am Limes. 4. Fachkolloquium der Deutschen Limeskommission 27/28 February 2007 in Osterburken. Theiss, Stuttgart, 2008, ISBN 978-3-8062-2251-7 (= Beiträge zum Welterbe Limes, 3), pp. 155–171, especially pp. 163–167.
- Thomas Fischer: Eine Bronzegießerei im Lagerdorf des römischen Kastells Pfünz, Gde. Walting, Lkr. Eichstätt, Oberbayern. In: Bayerische Vorgeschichtsblätter 49, 1984, pp. 299 ff.
- Horst Herzog: Der Pfünzer Münzschatz. In: Sammelblatt des Historischen Vereins Eichstätt 86. Eichstätt, 1993. pp. 7–61.
- Carsten Mischka: Die neu entdeckte Mansio in der Außensiedlung des Kastells Pfünz. In: Der Limes. Nachrichtenblatt der Deutschen Limenskommission. 5th annual 2011, Issue 1, pp. 8–13. (also online; pdf; 3,9 MB)
- Friedrich Winkelmann: Das Kastell Pfuenz. In: Ernst Fabricius, Felix Hettner, Oscar von Sarwey (ed.): Der obergermanisch-raetische Limes des Roemerreiches B VII No. 73 (1901).
- Friedrich Winkelmann: Die Ausgrabungen zu Pfünz im Jahre 1891. In: Sammelblatt des Historischen Vereins Eichstätt 6, 1891, pp. 67–75.
- Friedrich Winkelmann: Die Ausgrabungen zu Pfünz im Jahre 1890. In: Sammelblatt des Historischen Vereins Eichstätt 5, 1890, pp. 71–80.
- Friedrich Winkelmann: Ergebnisse der Ausgrabungen zu Pfünz im Jahre 1889. In: Sammelblatt des Historischen Vereins Eichstätt 4, 1889, pp. 93–98.
- Karl Zecherle: Ex ruinis extruxit: der Wiederaufbau des Römerkastells Pfünz bei Eichstätt. In: Schönere Heimat 81, 1992, pp. 82–86.
