= Gungolding =

- Ortsteil of Walting
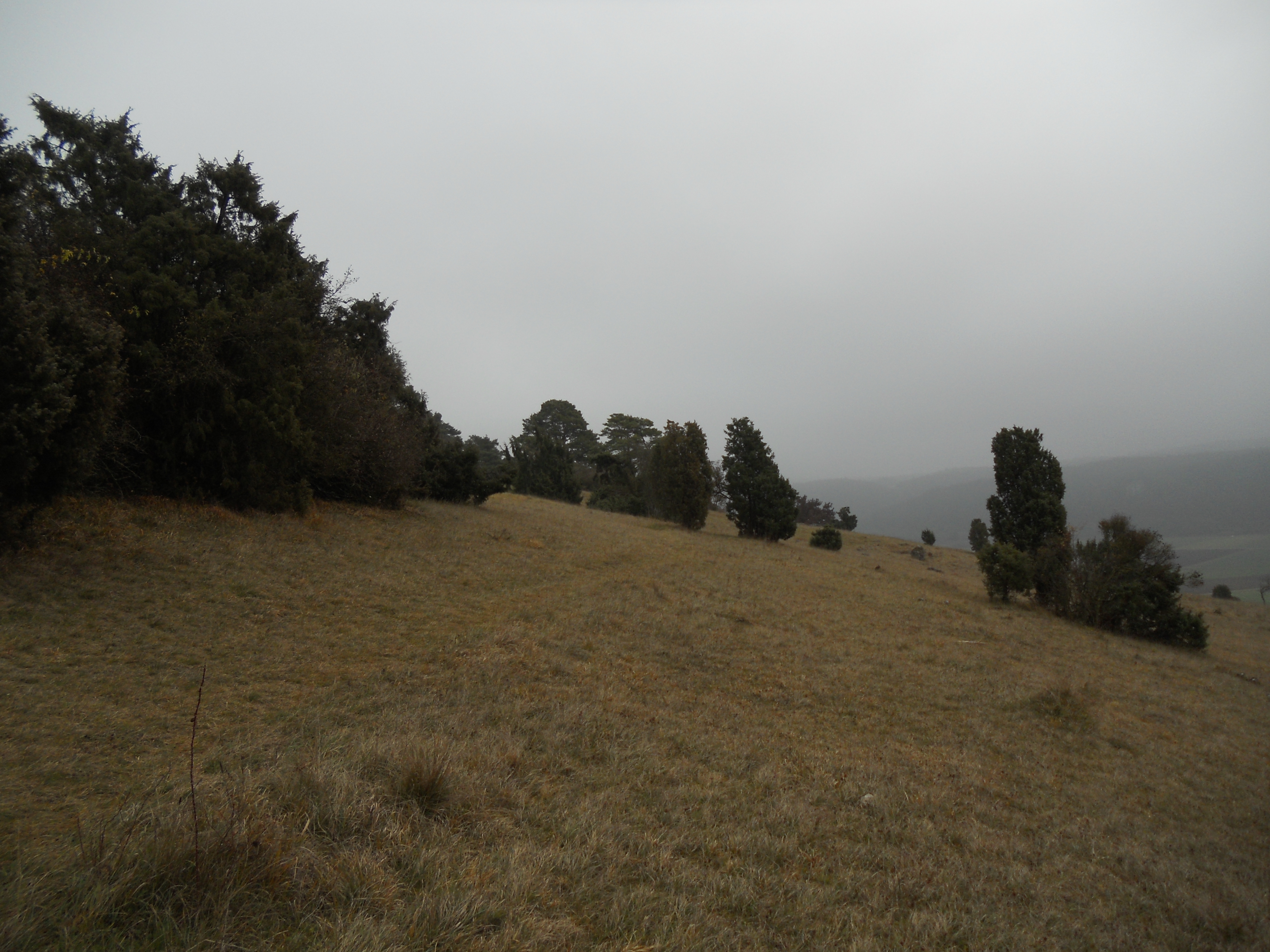
- A hill near Gungolding (Wacholderheide)
- Interactive map of Gungolding
- Location within Germany Location within Bavaria
- Coordinates: 48°55′N 11°21′E
- Country: Germany
- State: Bavaria
- Admin. region: Oberbayern
- District: Eichstätt
- Municipality: Walting
- Demonym: Gungoldinger
- Time zone: UTC+01:00 (CET)
  - Summer (DST): UTC+02:00 (CEST)
- Postal codes: 85137
- Dialling codes: 08465
- Vehicle registration: EI

Gungolding is a German village and hamlet (Ortsteil) of the municipality of Walting, in the District of Eichstätt, Bavaria.

== Overview ==
The village's roots traces back more than 1,000 years back located on a Roman road to connect the Roman Fortified Border System. The river Altmühl also flows through the center of the village.
