= Stammham =

Stammham may refer to two places in Bavaria, Germany:

- Stammham, Altötting, in the district of Altötting
- Stammham, Eichstätt, in the district of Eichstätt
