= Kleine Donau =

Kleine Donau (English: Little Danube) is the name of a number of branches of the Danube:

- Kleine Donau (Ilm), a river of Bavaria, Germany, a lower course for a part of the Ilm and a tributary of the Danube
- Little Danube, a branch of the river Danube in Slovakia
- Donaukanal, a former arm of the river Danube, since 1598 regulated as a water channel within the city of Vienna, Austria
