= Edi Stöhr =

German association football player

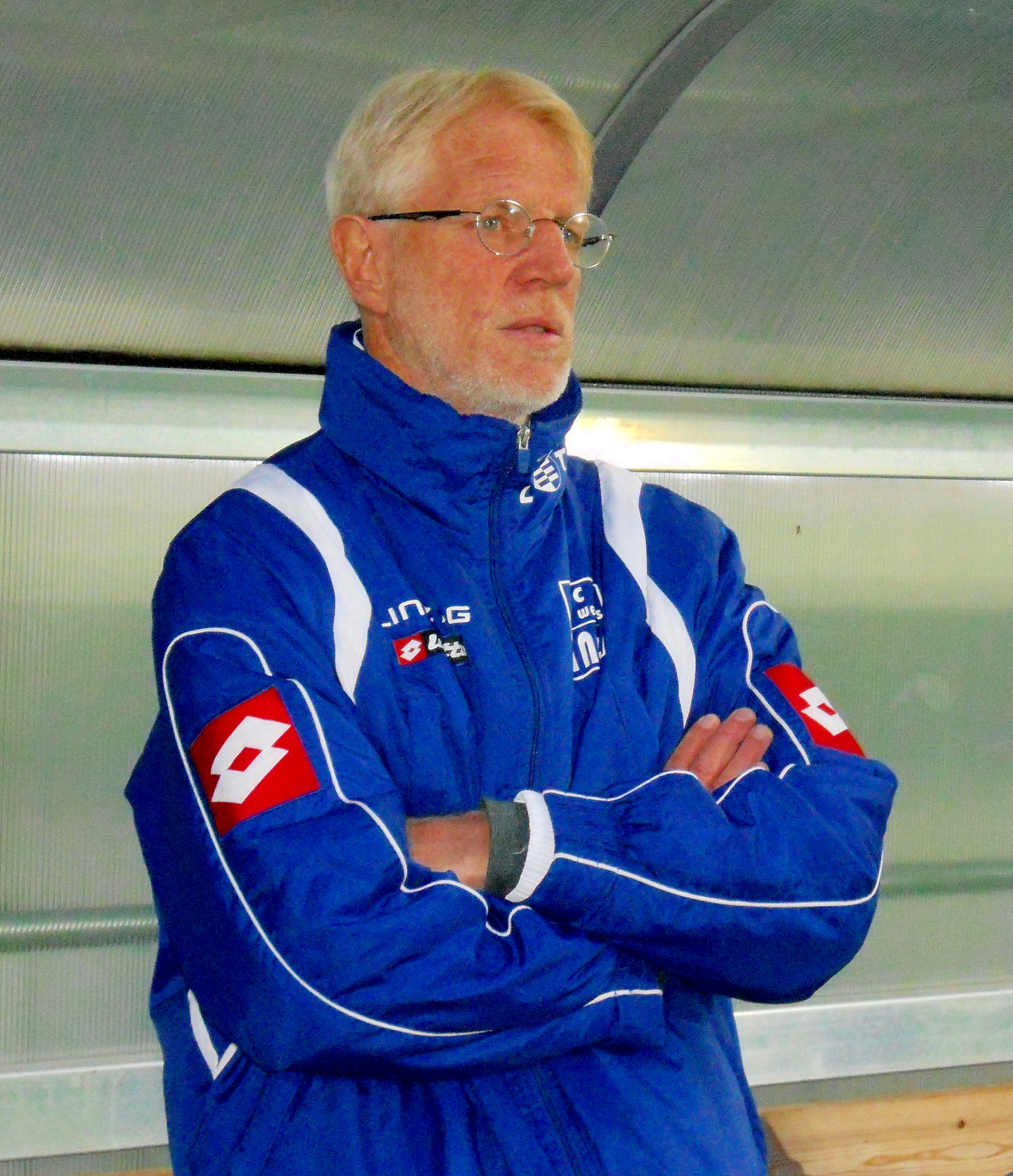
- Stöhr in 2013

Personal information
- Full name: Edmund Stöhr
- Date of birth: 17 September 1956 (age 70)
- Place of birth: Kösching, Germany
- Height: 1.86 m (6 ft 1 in)
- Position: Defender

Senior career*
Years	Team	Apps	(Gls)
1978–1980	MTV Ingolstadt	71	(10)
1980–1985	Hertha BSC	136	(6)
1985–1991	SpVgg Unterhaching	36	(2)

Managerial career
- 1994–1999: SC Austria Lustenau
- 1999–2000: FC Sachsen Leipzig
- 2001–2003: SC Austria Lustenau
- 2007–2008: Al-Gharafa Sports Club
- 2008–2009: Berliner Sport-Club
- 2009–2011: SC Austria Lustenau
- 2012: SC Rheindorf Altach
- 2012–2013: FC Blau-Weiss Linz
- * Club domestic league appearances and goals

Edmund 'Edi' Stöhr (born 17 September 1956, in Kösching) is a German football manager and former player.

== Honours ==
As a manager

- Austrian Football First League:
  - 1996–97

== Managerial career ==
After retiring, he became a manager. He has managed SC Austria Lustenau on 3 occasions.
