= Andreas Buchner =

German footballer

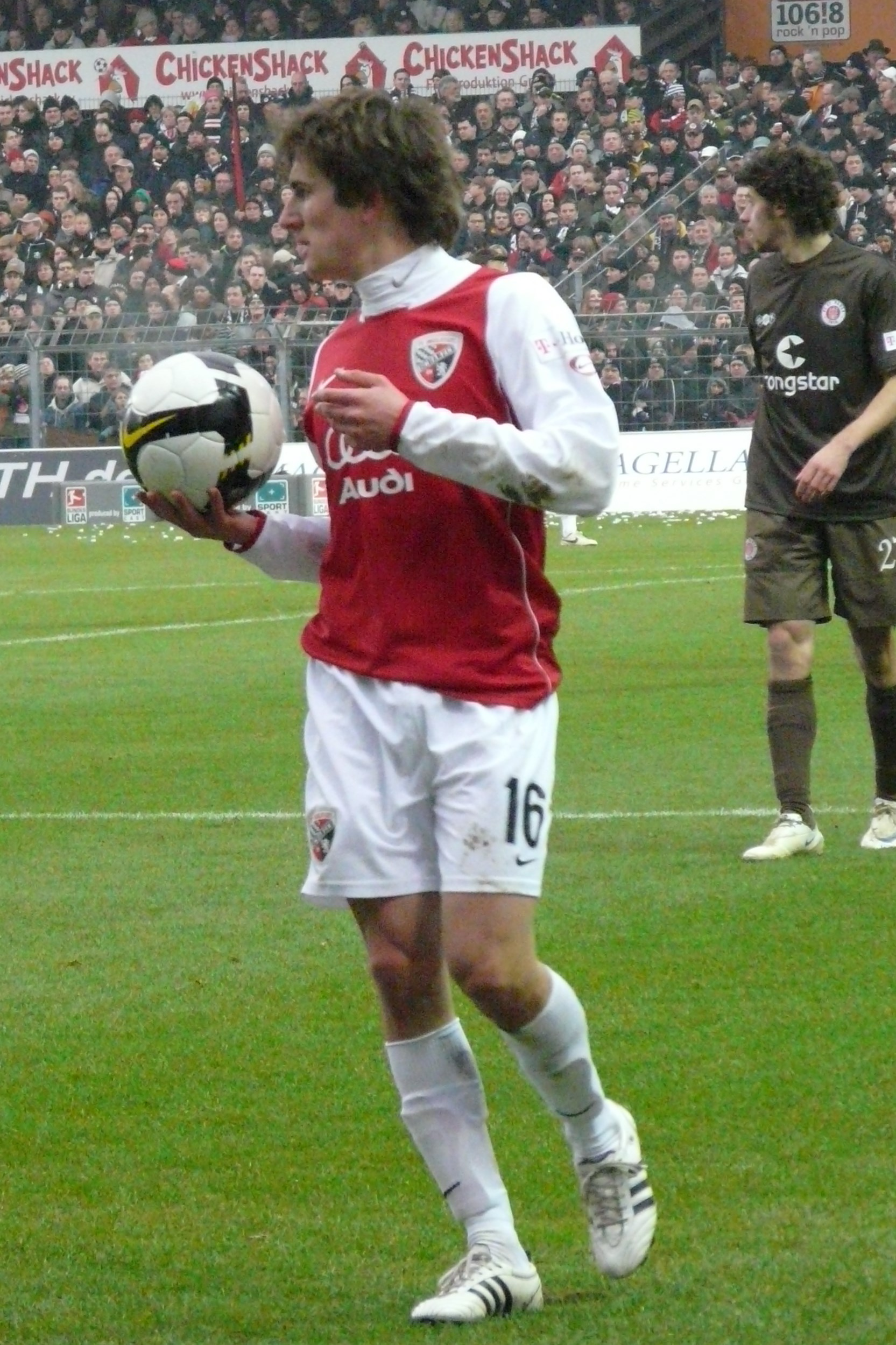

Personal information
- Date of birth: 15 May 1985 (age 41)
- Place of birth: Kösching, West Germany
- Height: 1.68 m (5 ft 6 in)
- Position: Midfielder

Youth career
- 1992–2004: TSV Pförring
- 2004–2005: TSV Dietfurt
- 2005–2006: FC Ingolstadt 04

Senior career*
Years	Team	Apps	(Gls)
2006–2014	FC Ingolstadt 04	157	(18)
2013–2017	FC Ingolstadt 04 II	97	(24)
- * Club domestic league appearances and goals

Andreas Buchner (born 15 May 1985 in Kösching) is a retired German footballer. He made his debut on the professional league level when he came on as a substitute for FC Ingolstadt 04 in the 65th minute in the 2. Bundesliga game against SC Freiburg on 2 November 2008. He scored a goal four minutes after coming onto the pitch.

In June 2014, he renewed his expiring contract with FC Ingolstadt 04 for another two years. However it was reported that he shall especially be a leading figure in their reserve team, playing in fourth tier Regionalliga Bayern.
