= Markus Buchheit =

German politician (born 1983)

Markus Buchheit MEP
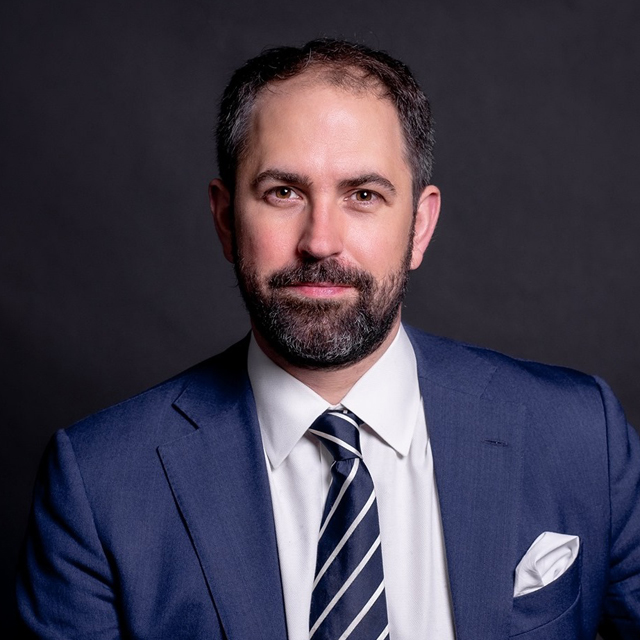

Member of the European Parliament for Germany
- Incumbent
- Assumed office 2 July 2019

Personal details
- Party: Alternative for Germany (2016-); Christian Social Union in Bavaria (before 2016)
- Website: https://www.markus-buchheit.de/en

Markus Buchheit (born August 11, 1983 in Zweibrücken) is a German politician who is serving as an Alternative for Germany Member of the European Parliament.

Buchheit grew up in Pollenfeld and attended school in Eichstätt. He studied law and political science at the University of Bayreuth and the Bavarian School of Public Policy. After graduating, he worked for a Franco-German law firm in Strasbourg and Paris for a period.

Buchheit was a member of the Young Union, the youth-wing for the Christian Social Union in Bavaria. In 2014, he worked at the European Parliament as an assistant to FPÖ MEP Franz Obermayr and then as an adviser on international trade for the Europe of Nations and Freedom parliamentary group. In 2016, he joined AfD and in May 2019 he was elected to the European Parliament.

As an MEP, Buchheit has argued that Germany should hold a referendum on its membership of the Eurozone, arguing the single-currency has more flaws than benefits, and warned of the risks of takeovers of technological companies by non-European investors. He is in favor of common European regulations on direct investments by foreign companies in the European internal market. He also calls for Germany to withdraw from Ursula von der Leyen's "Green Deal" climate policy program because he fears it will result in a "massive cutback" in European industry, especially in the automotive sector.
