= Eichstätt (Verwaltungsgemeinschaft) =

- Verwaltungsgemeinschaft
- Location of Eichstätt within Eichstätt district
- Interactive map of Eichstätt
- Location within Germany Location within Bavaria
- Coordinates: 48°54′N 11°11′E
- Country: Germany
- State: Bavaria
- Admin. region: Upper Bavaria
- District: Eichstätt
- Seat: Eichstätt
- Subdivisions: 3 municipalities

Area
  - Total: 137.61 km^{2} (53.13 sq mi)

Population (2025-12-31)
  - Total: 8,625
  - Density: 62.68/km^{2} (162.3/sq mi)
- Time zone: UTC+01:00 (CET)
  - Summer (DST): UTC+02:00 (CEST)
- Website: www.vg-eichstaett.de

Eichstätt is a Verwaltungsgemeinschaft (municipal association) in the district of Eichstätt in Bavaria, Germany. Its seat is in Eichstätt, itself not part of the Verwaltungsgemeinschaft.

It consists of the following municipalities:

1. Pollenfeld
2. Schernfeld
3. Walting
