= Oberdolling =

- Municipality
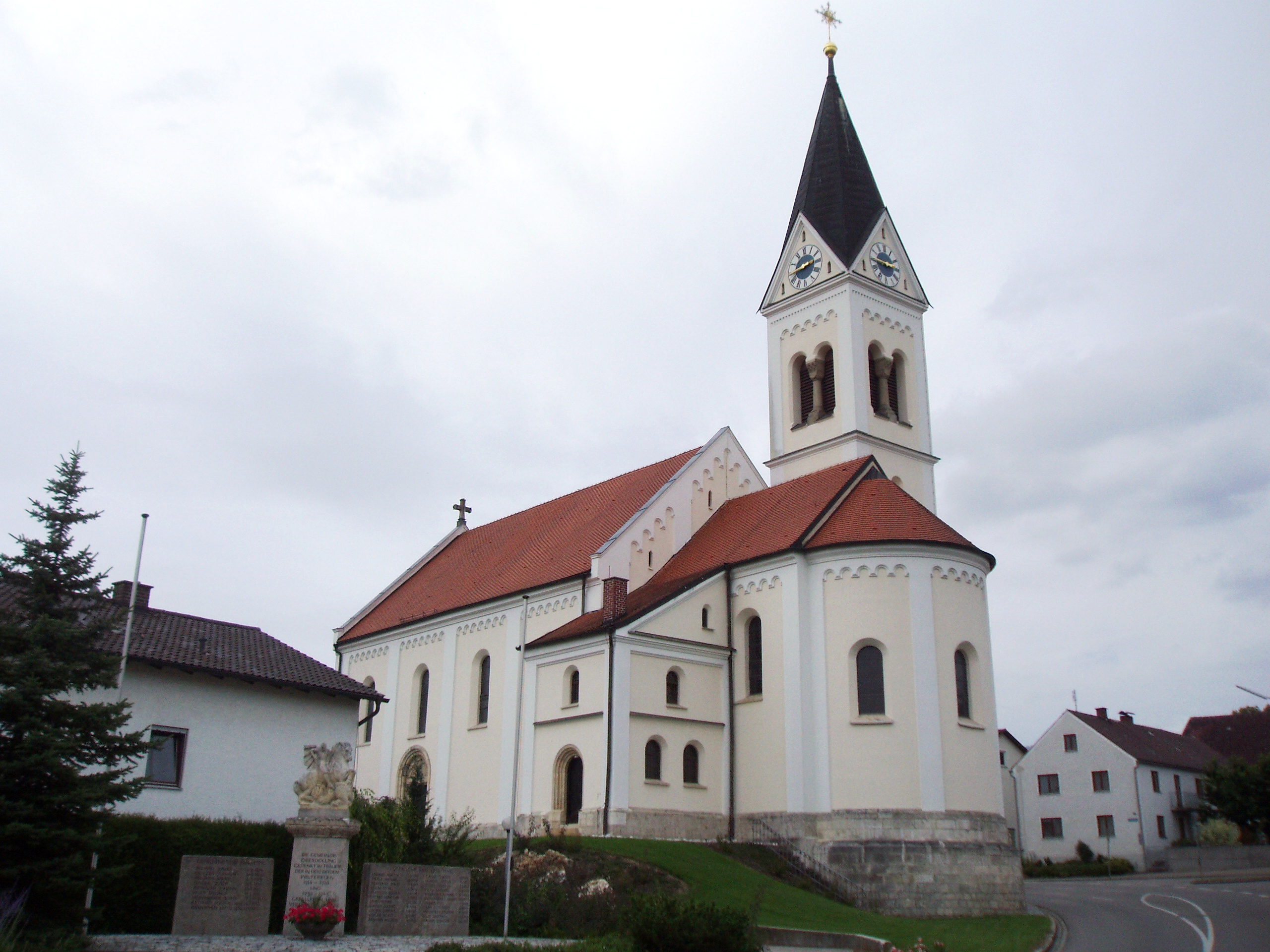
- Church of Saint George

- Coat of arms

- Location of Oberdolling within Eichstätt district
- Interactive map of Oberdolling
- Location within Germany Location within Bavaria
- Coordinates: 48°50′N 11°35′E
- Country: Germany
- State: Bavaria
- Admin. region: Oberbayern
- District: Eichstätt
- Municipal assoc.: Pförring
- Subdivisions: 6 Ortsteile

Government
  - Mayor (2020–26): Josef Lohr (CSU)

Area
  - Total: 19.37 km^{2} (7.48 sq mi)
- Elevation: 382 m (1,253 ft)

Population (2025-12-31)
  - Total: 1,371
  - Density: 70.78/km^{2} (183.3/sq mi)
- Time zone: UTC+01:00 (CET)
  - Summer (DST): UTC+02:00 (CEST)
- Postal codes: 85129
- Dialling codes: 08404
- Vehicle registration: EI
- Website: www.oberdolling.de

Oberdolling is a municipality in the district of Eichstätt in Bavaria in Germany.

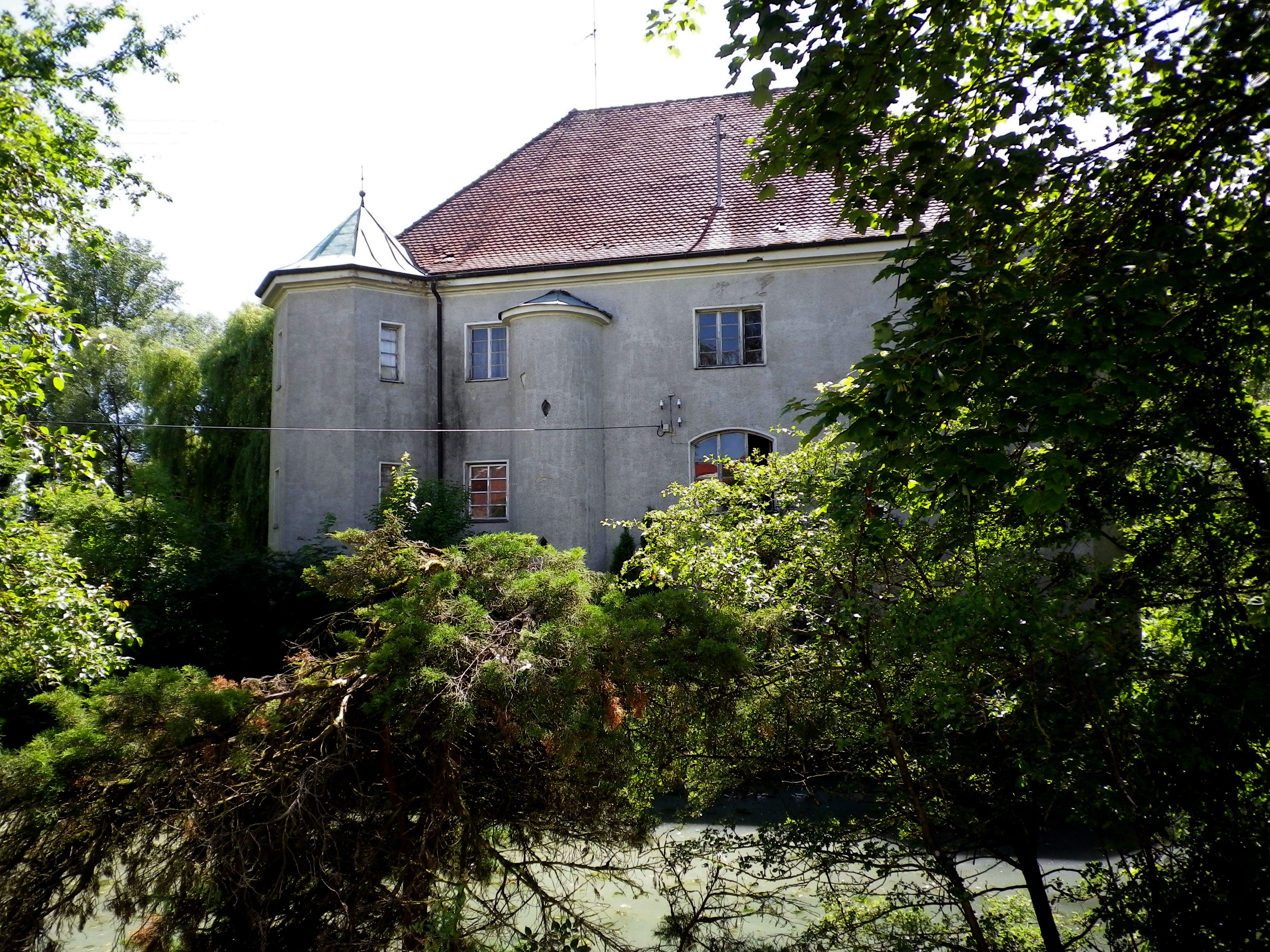
Water castle Oberdolling
