= Mindelstetten =

- Municipality
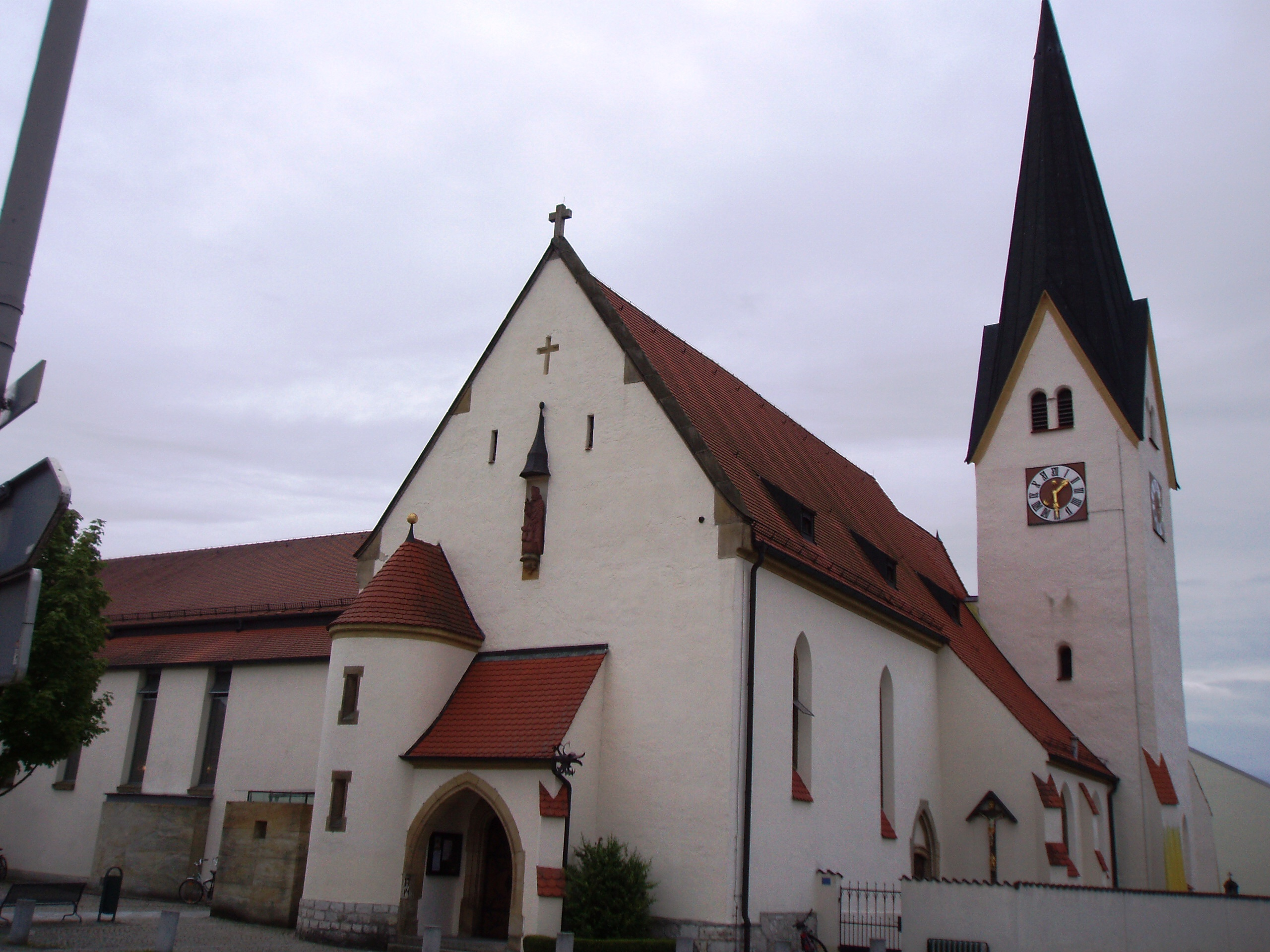
- Church of Saint Nicholas

- Coat of arms

- Location of Mindelstetten within Eichstätt district
- Interactive map of Mindelstetten
- Location within Germany Location within Bavaria
- Coordinates: 48°51′N 11°39′E
- Country: Germany
- State: Bavaria
- Admin. region: Oberbayern
- District: Eichstätt
- Municipal assoc.: Pförring
- Subdivisions: 7 Ortsteile

Government
  - Mayor (2020–26): Alfred Paulus

Area
  - Total: 22.68 km^{2} (8.76 sq mi)
- Elevation: 403 m (1,322 ft)

Population (2025-12-31)
  - Total: 1,822
  - Density: 80.34/km^{2} (208.1/sq mi)
- Time zone: UTC+01:00 (CET)
  - Summer (DST): UTC+02:00 (CEST)
- Postal codes: 93349
- Dialling codes: 08404
- Vehicle registration: EI
- Website: http://mindelstetten.de/

Mindelstetten (German pronunciation: [mɪndl̩ˈʃtɛtn̩]) is a municipality in the district of Eichstätt in Bavaria in Germany.

It is a center of veneration for Saint Anna Schäffer.

== Mayors ==
- since 2014: Alfred Paulus (CWG)
- 2002-2014: Josef Kunder (CSU)

== Notable people ==
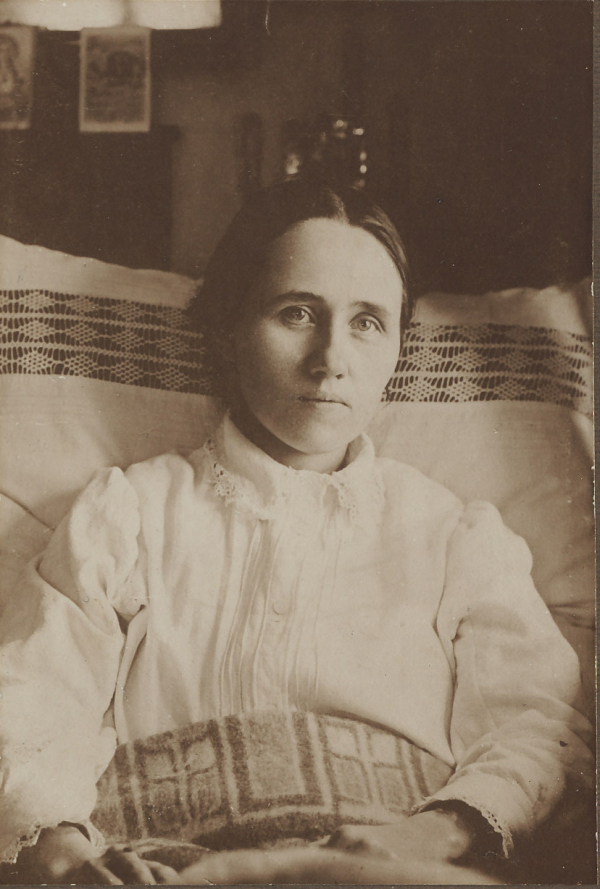
Anna Schäffer (1920)

- Anna Schäffer (1882-1925), canonized by Pope Benedict XVI on October 21, 2012
