= Pförring (Verwaltungsgemeinschaft) =

- Verwaltungsgemeinschaft
- Location of Pförring within Eichstätt district
- Interactive map of Pförring
- Location within Germany Location within Bavaria
- Coordinates: 48°49′N 11°41′E
- Country: Germany
- State: Bavaria
- Admin. region: Upper Bavaria
- District: Eichstätt
- Seat: Pförring
- Subdivisions: 3 municipalities

Area
  - Total: 85.55 km^{2} (33.03 sq mi)

Population (2025-12-31)
  - Total: 7,293
  - Density: 85.25/km^{2} (220.8/sq mi)
- Time zone: UTC+01:00 (CET)
  - Summer (DST): UTC+02:00 (CEST)

Pförring is a Verwaltungsgemeinschaft (municipal association) in the district of Eichstätt in Bavaria, Germany. Its seat is in Pförring.

It consists of the following municipalities:

1. Mindelstetten
2. Oberdolling
3. Pförring
