= Böhmfeld =

- Municipality
- Coat of arms

- Location of Böhmfeld within Eichstätt district
- Interactive map of Böhmfeld
- Location within Germany Location within Bavaria
- Coordinates: 48°52′N 11°22′E
- Country: Germany
- State: Bavaria
- Admin. region: Oberbayern
- District: Eichstätt
- Municipal assoc.: Eitensheim

Government
  - Mayor (2020–26): Jürgen Nadler

Area
  - Total: 16.26 km^{2} (6.28 sq mi)
- Elevation: 487 m (1,598 ft)

Population (2025-12-31)
  - Total: 1,697
  - Density: 104.4/km^{2} (270.3/sq mi)
- Time zone: UTC+01:00 (CET)
  - Summer (DST): UTC+02:00 (CEST)
- Postal codes: 85113
- Dialling codes: 08406
- Vehicle registration: EI
- Website: www.boehmfeld.eu

Böhmfeld (German pronunciation: [ˈbøːmfɛlt]) is a municipality in the district of Eichstätt in Bavaria in Germany.

== History ==
- 1602: About 400 people lived in Böhmfeld in 63 houses.
- School houses were built in 1777, 1839, 1892 and 1962.
- In 1806 Böhmfeld came to the newly founded Kingdom of Bavaria.
- After 1945 refugees came to Böhmfeld.

== Mayor ==
- 1984–2020: Alfred Ostermeier (SPD/FW)
- since 2020: Jürgen Nadler (SPD/FW)
