= Lenting =

- Municipality
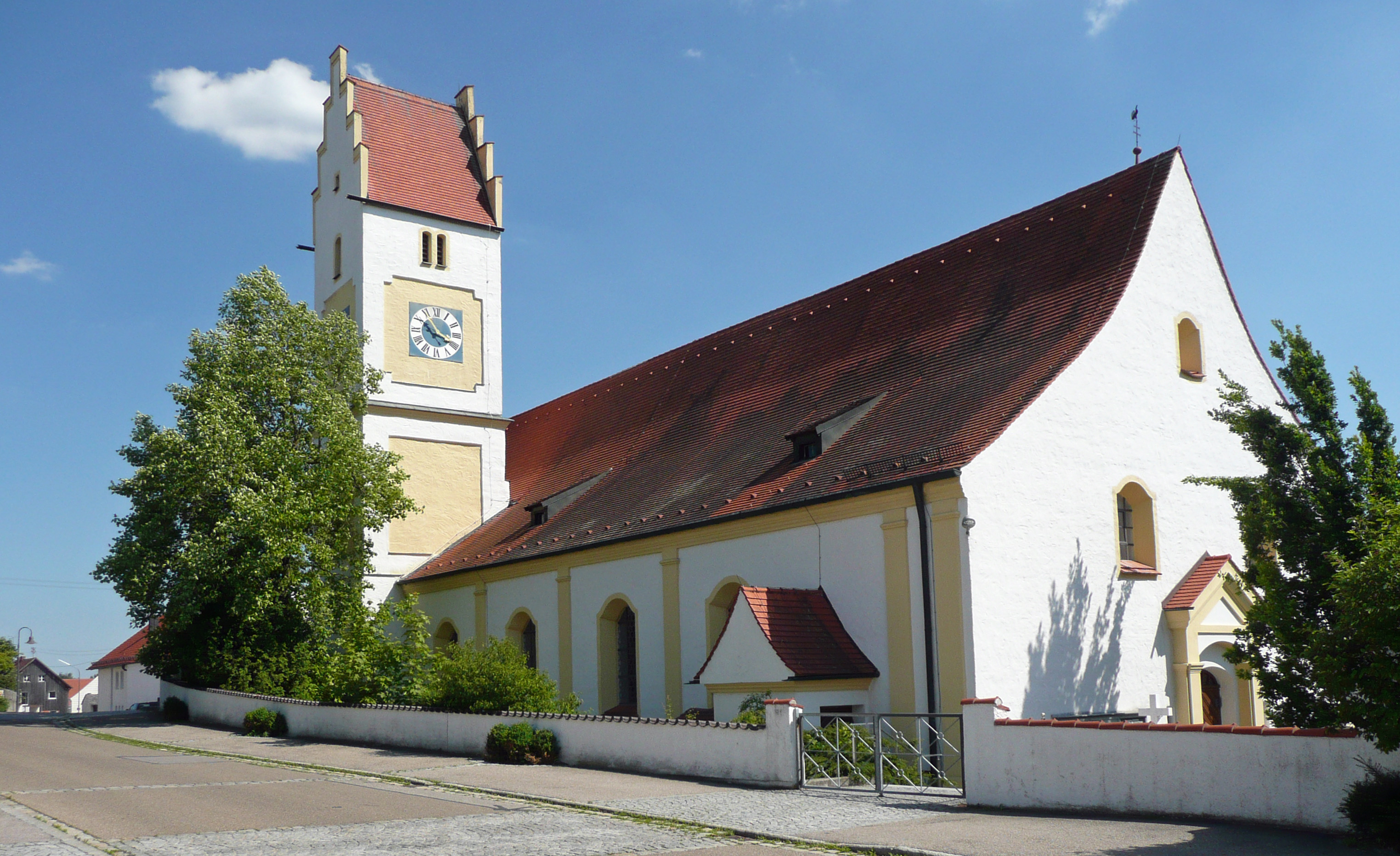
- Church of Saint Nicholas

- Coat of arms

- Location of Lenting within Eichstätt district
- Interactive map of Lenting
- Location within Germany Location within Bavaria
- Coordinates: 48°48′N 11°28′E
- Country: Germany
- State: Bavaria
- Admin. region: Oberbayern
- District: Eichstätt

Government
  - Mayor (2024–30): Christian Conradt (CSU)

Area
  - Total: 8.48 km^{2} (3.27 sq mi)
- Elevation: 385 m (1,263 ft)

Population (2025-12-31)
  - Total: 4,980
  - Density: 587/km^{2} (1,520/sq mi)
- Time zone: UTC+01:00 (CET)
  - Summer (DST): UTC+02:00 (CEST)
- Postal codes: 85101
- Dialling codes: 08456
- Vehicle registration: EI
- Website: www.lenting.de

Lenting (German pronunciation: [ˈlɛntɪŋ]) is a municipality in the district of Eichstätt in Bavaria in Germany.

== Mayors ==
The mayor is since April 2012 Christian Tauer (SPD):

Name (Party)	Time of office
Leonhard Händl	1933–1945
Josef Seitz (CSU)	1945–1956
Franz Binder (SPD)	1956–1978
Ludwig Wittmann (SPD)	1994–2012
Christian Tauer (SPD)	2012–2024
Christian Conradt (CSU)	since 2024
