= Altmannstein =

- Municipality
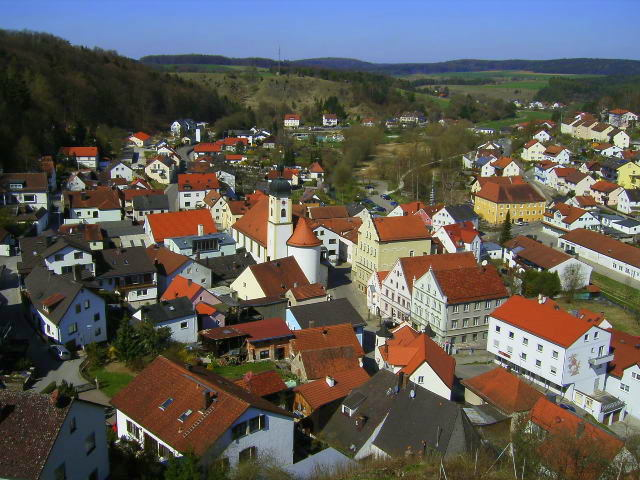
- Altmannstein

- Coat of arms

- Location of Altmannstein within Eichstätt district
- Interactive map of Altmannstein
- Location within Germany Location within Bavaria
- Coordinates: 48°54′N 11°39′E
- Country: Germany
- State: Bavaria
- Admin. region: Oberbayern
- District: Eichstätt
- Subdivisions: 14 Ortsteile

Government
  - Mayor (2020–26): Norbert Hummel

Area
  - Total: 114.14 km^{2} (44.07 sq mi)
- Elevation: 388 m (1,273 ft)

Population (2025-12-31)
  - Total: 7,195
  - Density: 63.04/km^{2} (163.3/sq mi)
- Time zone: UTC+01:00 (CET)
  - Summer (DST): UTC+02:00 (CEST)
- Postal codes: 93336
- Dialling codes: 09446
- Vehicle registration: EI
- Website: www.altmannstein.de

Altmannstein (German pronunciation: [ˈaltmanˌʃtaɪn]; Central Bavarian: Oidmannstoa) is a municipality in the district of Eichstätt in Bavaria in Germany.
