= Titting =

- Municipality
- Coat of arms

- Location of Titting within Eichstätt district
- Interactive map of Titting
- Location within Germany Location within Bavaria
- Coordinates: 49°0′N 11°13′E
- Country: Germany
- State: Bavaria
- Admin. region: Oberbayern
- District: Eichstätt

Government
  - Mayor (2020–26): Andreas Brigl (CSU)

Area
  - Total: 71.11 km^{2} (27.46 sq mi)
- Elevation: 447 m (1,467 ft)

Population (2025-12-31)
  - Total: 2,688
  - Density: 37.80/km^{2} (97.90/sq mi)
- Time zone: UTC+01:00 (CET)
  - Summer (DST): UTC+02:00 (CEST)
- Postal codes: 85135
- Dialling codes: 08423
- Vehicle registration: EI
- Website: www.titting.de

Titting (German pronunciation: [ˈtɪtɪŋ]) is a municipality in the district of Eichstätt in Bavaria in Germany. It is home to Brauerei Gutmann, which was founded in 1707.

== Mayors ==
- 1996–2014 Martin Heiß (CSU)
- since 2014: Andreas Brigl (CSU)
