= Schernfeld =

- Municipality
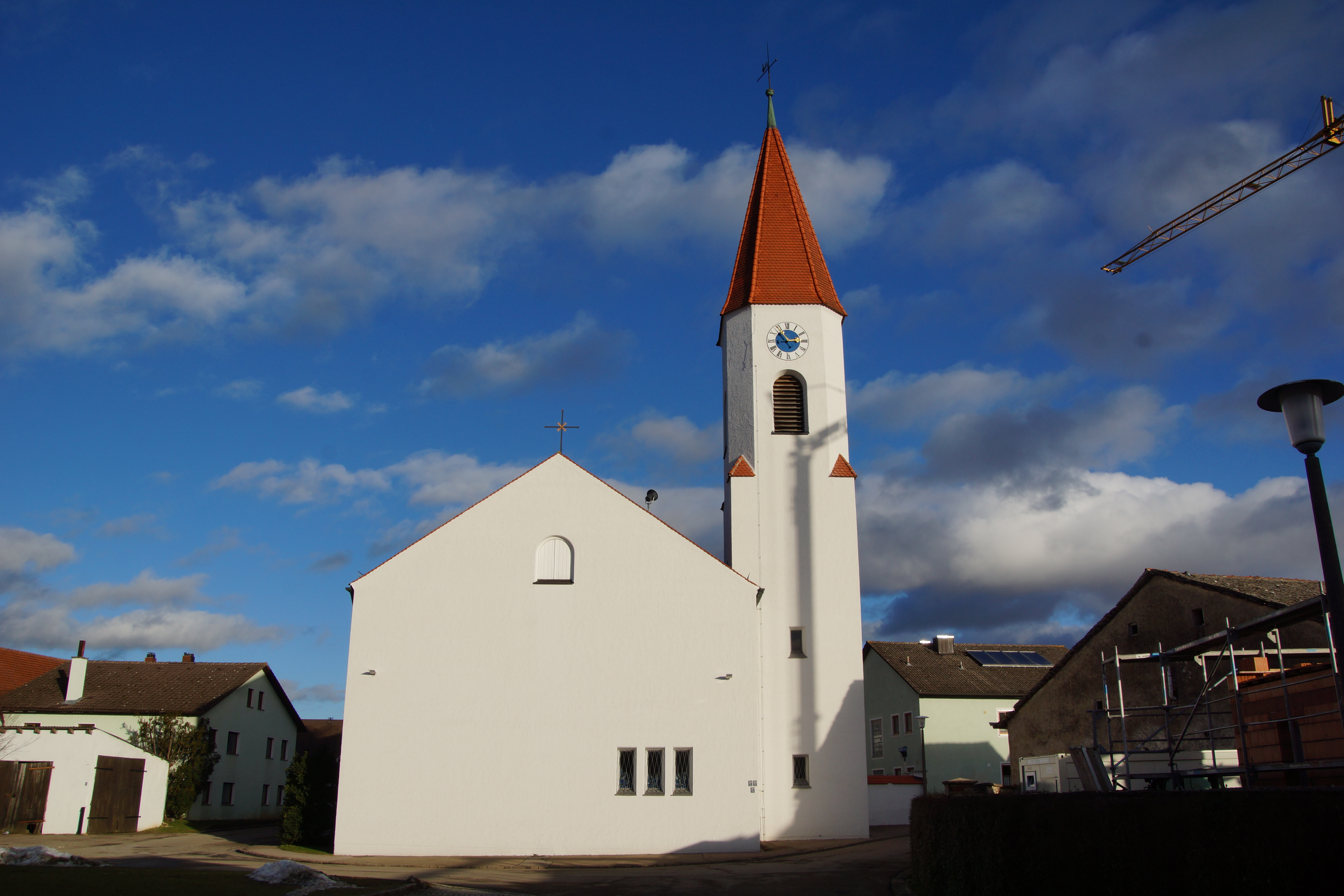
- Church of Saint George

- Coat of arms

- Location of Schernfeld within Eichstätt district
- Interactive map of Schernfeld
- Location within Germany Location within Bavaria
- Coordinates: 48°54′N 11°6′E
- Country: Germany
- State: Bavaria
- Admin. region: Oberbayern
- District: Eichstätt
- Municipal assoc.: Eichstätt
- Subdivisions: 8 Ortsteile

Government
  - Mayor (2020–26): Stefan Bauer (FW)

Area
  - Total: 52.25 km^{2} (20.17 sq mi)
- Elevation: 548 m (1,798 ft)

Population (2025-12-31)
  - Total: 3,285
  - Density: 62.87/km^{2} (162.8/sq mi)
- Time zone: UTC+01:00 (CET)
  - Summer (DST): UTC+02:00 (CEST)
- Postal codes: 85132
- Dialling codes: 08422 bzw. 08421
- Vehicle registration: EI
- Website: www.schernfeld.de

Schernfeld (German pronunciation: [ˈʃɛʁnfɛlt]) is a municipality in the district of Eichstätt in Bavaria in Germany.

== Mayor ==
Ludwig Mayinger is the mayor since 1996.
