= Eitensheim (Verwaltungsgemeinschaft) =

- Verwaltungsgemeinschaft
- Location of Eitensheim within Eichstätt district
- Interactive map of Eitensheim
- Location within Germany Location within Bavaria
- Coordinates: 48°49′N 11°19′E
- Country: Germany
- State: Bavaria
- Admin. region: Upper Bavaria
- District: Eichstätt
- Seat: Eitensheim
- Subdivisions: 2 municipalities

Area
  - Total: 31.97 km^{2} (12.34 sq mi)

Population (2025-12-31)
  - Total: 4,727
  - Density: 147.9/km^{2} (382.9/sq mi)
- Time zone: UTC+01:00 (CET)
  - Summer (DST): UTC+02:00 (CEST)
- Website: www.eitensheim.de

Eitensheim is a Verwaltungsgemeinschaft (municipal association) in the district of Eichstätt in Bavaria, Germany. Its seat is in Eitensheim.

It consists of the following municipalities:

1. Böhmfeld
2. Eitensheim
