= Anna Schäffer =

German Roman Catholic saint (1882–1925)

Saint Anna Schäffer
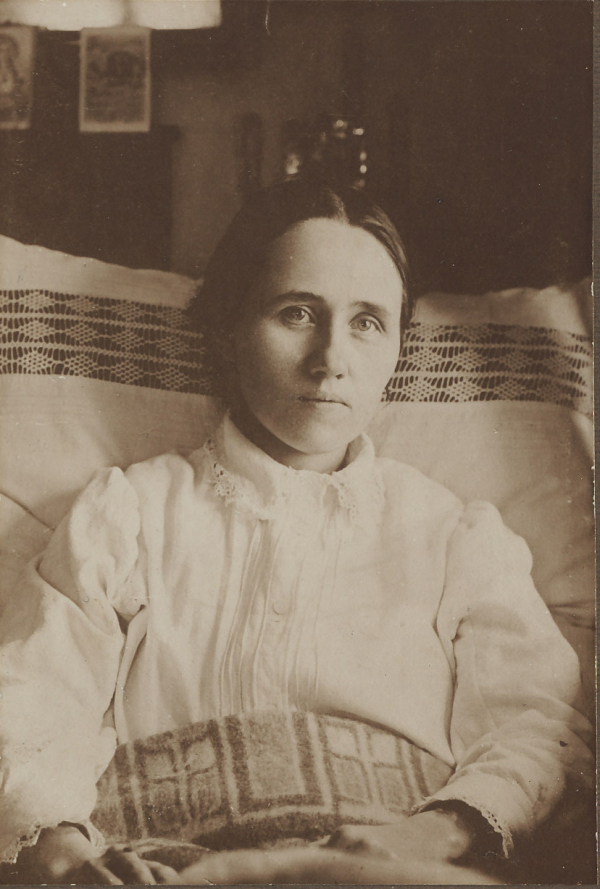
- Schäffer in 1920

Virgin
- Born: 18 February 1882; Mindelstetten, Bavaria, German Empire
- Died: 5 October 1925 (aged 43); Mindelstetten, Bavaria, Germany
- Venerated in: Roman Catholic Church
- Beatified: March 7, 1999, Saint Peter's Basilica, Vatican City by Pope John Paul II
- Canonized: October 21, 2012, Vatican City by Pope Benedict XVI
- Feast: 5 October (Roman Catholic)

Anna Schäffer (February 18, 1882 – October 5, 1925) was a German woman who lived in Mindelstetten in Bavaria. She was canonized by Pope Benedict XVI on October 21, 2012.

== Childhood ==
Schäffer's father, a carpenter, died at the age of 40, leaving his family in great poverty. Anna dropped out of school and worked as a maid from the age of fourteen, hoping eventually to be able to enter a religious order. But with family obligations she could barely make ends meet. In 1898, she had a vision of Christ in which she was told that she was destined to endure long and painful suffering.

On February 4, 1901, while working at a laundry, Schäffer slipped and fell while reattaching a stovepipe and boiled her legs in the washing machine. She was taken to hospital, but nothing could be done about the painful burns. More than thirty surgical operations followed, and the wounds had to be carefully dressed, which also caused much pain. Despite the constant care of her doctor, Dr. Waldin, skin grafts did not succeed and Schäffer became completely immobile. She was therefore forced to abandon her longtime dream of entering a religious order. Her mother was to care for her until the end of her life.

== Works and later life ==
Schäffer never lost her optimism and became even more devoted to her faith while enduring constant suffering. She was often unable to sleep, but continued to express her adoration of Christ and her veneration of Mary. She had a special devotion to the Sacred Heart of Jesus. A local abbot would bring her the Eucharist daily. She wrote: "I cannot write by pen how happy I am every time after Holy Communion. Ah, I forget my earthly suffering and the longing of my poor soul draws me every moment to adore my God and Savior hidden in the Blessed Sacrament!"

She considered her suffering, her writing, and her ability to knit clothes for her friends the three "keys" by which she could enter Heaven. Her beatific attitude made her a beloved figure in town and people would often visit her to hear her comforting words of faith. A French writer says of her that "those who were the most prejudiced against Anna did not fail to be impressed by her patience and her kindness." Even her irreligious brother eventually came to her support.

From 1910 mystical phenomena developed around her, including what could be described as stigmata, which she did her best to conceal from the public, and occasional waking visions which made her ecstatic. These developments brought no change in her attitude, though: she remained selfless, and promised prayers and letters for anyone who wanted them.

In 1925, she was diagnosed with colon cancer, and her paralysis spread to her spine, making it difficult to speak or write. On the morning of October 5, she received her final Holy Communion, and suddenly spoke: "Jesus, I live for you!" She died minutes later. At her funeral many already believed that they had known a saint.

== Beatification and canonization ==
After her death it became common to visit her grave to have prayers answered. Since 1929, more than 15,000 miracles attributed to such prayers have been reported. In 1998, 551 miracles allegedly obtained through her intercession were recorded in the parish of Mindelstetten.

Schäffer was proposed for beatification in 1973. Over 20,000 letters and testimonies were collected as part of a detailed examination of her case.

During her beatification, 7 March 1999, Pope John Paul II said: "If we look to Blessed Anna Schäffer, we read in her life a living commentary on what Saint Paul wrote to the Romans: 'Hope does not disappoint, because the love of God has been poured out into our hearts through the Holy Spirit that has been given to us' (Rom. 5:5). She most certainly was not spared the struggle to abandon herself to the will of God. But she was given to grow in the correct understanding that weakness and suffering are the pages on which God writes His Gospel ... Her sickbed became the cradle of an apostolate that extended to the whole world."

In 2012, her notebook, entitled Thoughts and memories of my life of illness and my longing for the eternal homeland, was translated into English. On 21 October 2012, she was canonized by Pope Benedict XVI.

== See also ==
- List of canonizations
- List of Catholic saints
- List of saints canonized by Pope Benedict XVI
