= Hepberg =

- Municipality
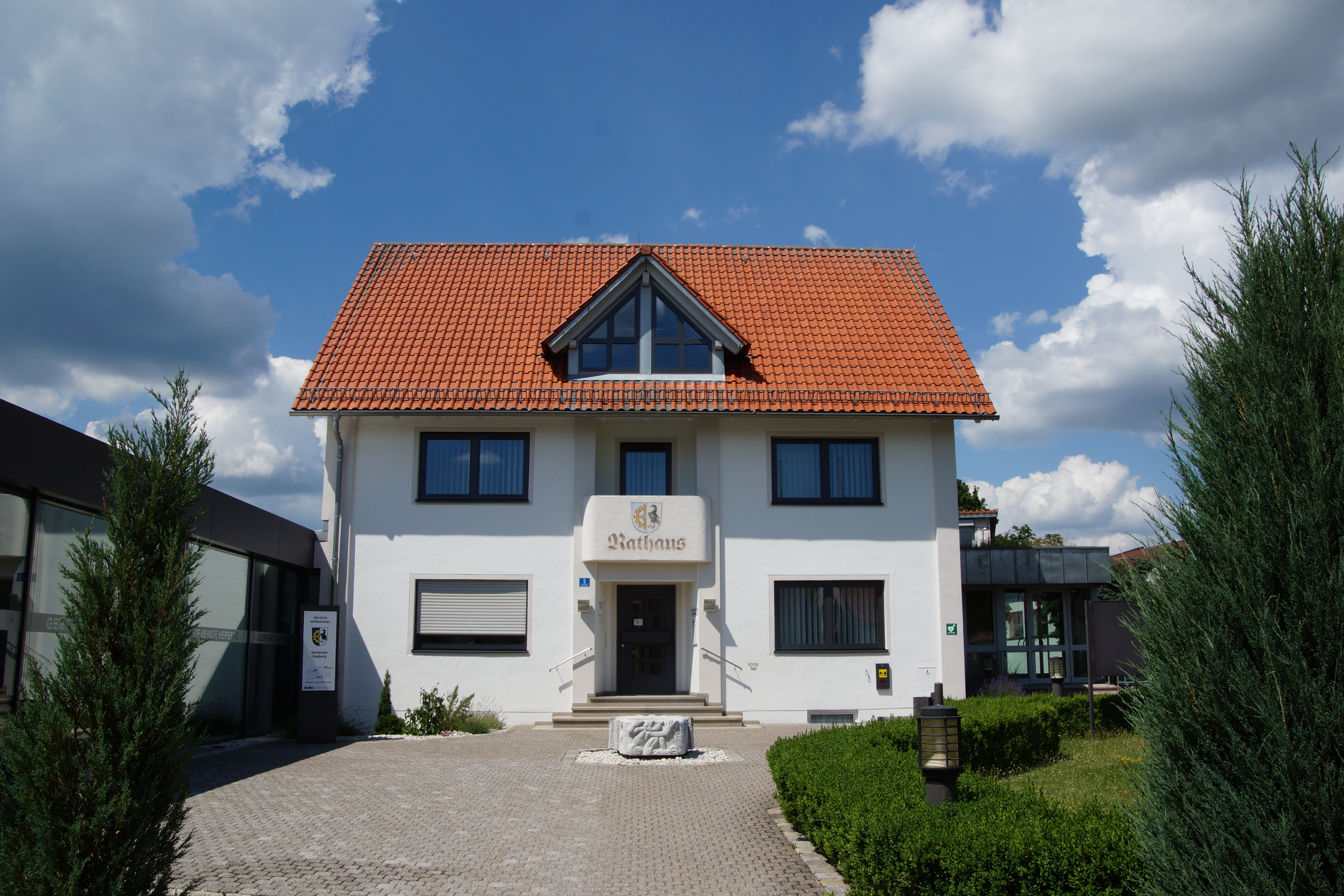
- Town hall

- Coat of arms

- Location of Hepberg within Eichstätt district
- Interactive map of Hepberg
- Location within Germany Location within Bavaria
- Coordinates: 48°49′N 11°28′E
- Country: Germany
- State: Bavaria
- Admin. region: Oberbayern
- District: Eichstätt

Government
  - Mayor (2020–26): Raimund Lindner

Area
  - Total: 4.16 km^{2} (1.61 sq mi)
- Elevation: 430 m (1,410 ft)

Population (2025-12-31)
  - Total: 3,077
  - Density: 740/km^{2} (1,920/sq mi)
- Time zone: UTC+01:00 (CET)
  - Summer (DST): UTC+02:00 (CEST)
- Postal codes: 85120
- Dialling codes: 08456
- Vehicle registration: EI
- Website: https://www.hepberg.de/

Hepberg is a municipality in the district of Eichstätt in Bavaria in Germany.
