= Pollenfeld =

- Municipality
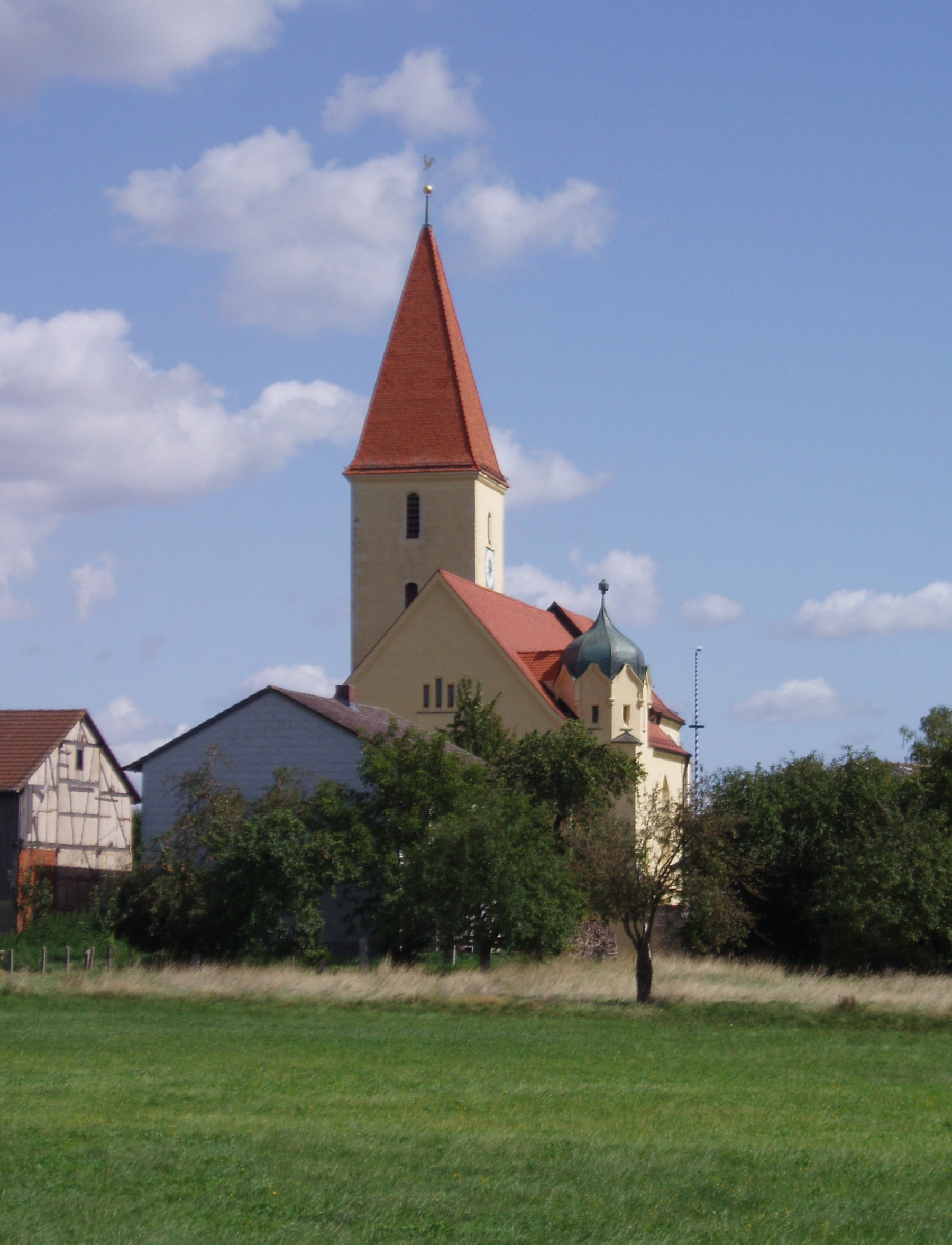
- Church of Saint Sixtus

- Coat of arms

- Location of Pollenfeld within Eichstätt district
- Interactive map of Pollenfeld
- Location within Germany Location within Bavaria
- Coordinates: 48°57′N 11°12′E
- Country: Germany
- State: Bavaria
- Admin. region: Oberbayern
- District: Eichstätt
- Municipal assoc.: Eichstätt
- Subdivisions: 6 Ortsteile

Government
  - Mayor (2020–26): Wolfgang Wechsler (FW)

Area
  - Total: 45.64 km^{2} (17.62 sq mi)
- Elevation: 534 m (1,752 ft)

Population (2025-12-31)
  - Total: 3,051
  - Density: 66.85/km^{2} (173.1/sq mi)
- Time zone: UTC+01:00 (CET)
  - Summer (DST): UTC+02:00 (CEST)
- Postal codes: 85131
- Dialling codes: 08421
- Vehicle registration: EI
- Website: www.pollenfeld.de

Pollenfeld (German pronunciation: [ˈpɔlənfɛlt]) is a municipality in the district of Eichstätt in Bavaria in Germany.

== Division of Pollenfeld ==
Districts: Pollenfeld with Wörmersdorf, Seuversholz with Ziegelhütte, Sornhüll with Götzelshard, Wachenzell with Ziegelhütte, Weigersdorf and Preith.

== Geography ==
Pollenfeld lies in the Ingolstadt region, 8 km (approx. 5 miles) north of the district seat (Kreisstadt) of Eichstätt in the Franconian Jura mountains.

== History ==
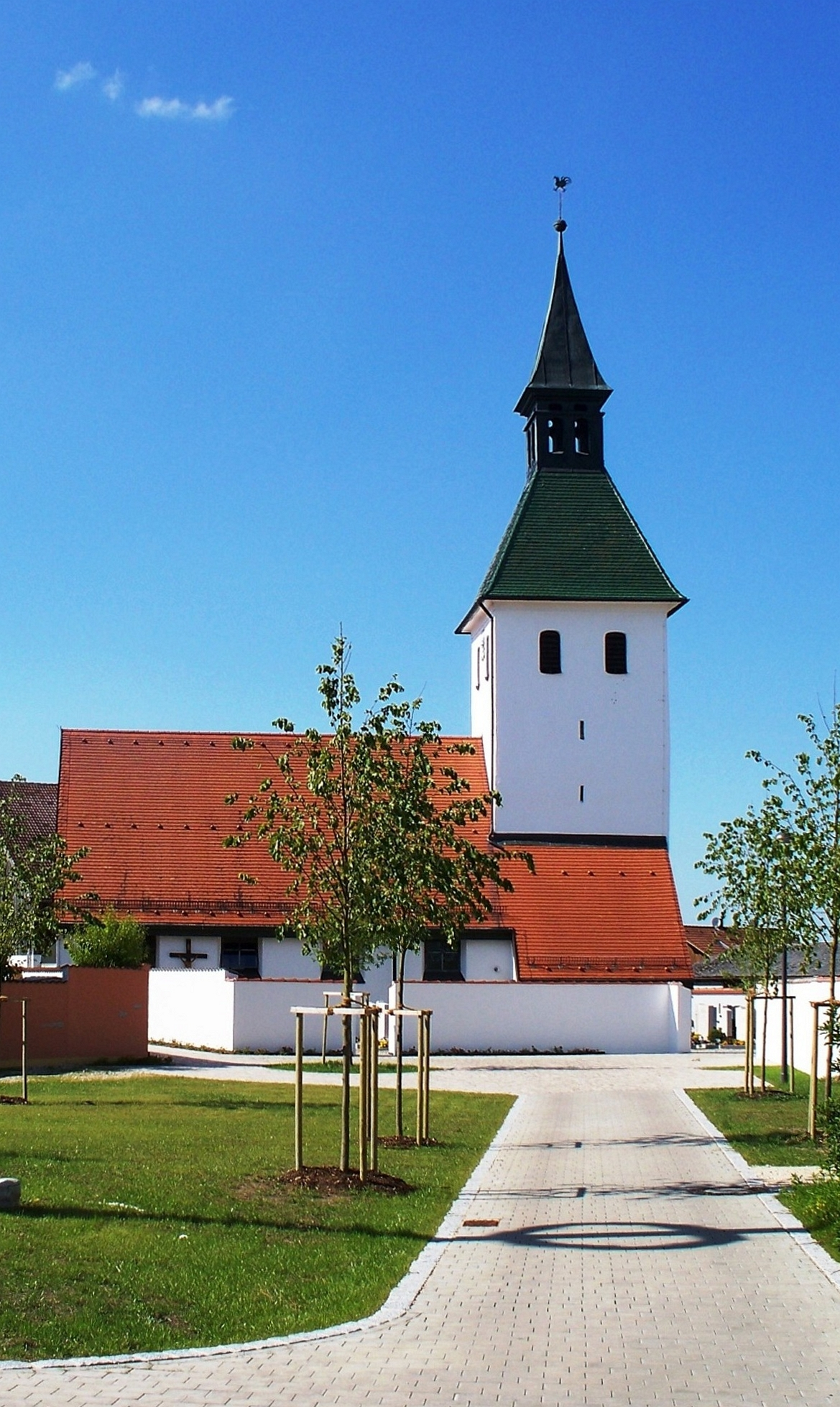
Church in Seuversholz

Pollenfeld had long been part the Prince-Bishopric of Eichstätt. The place has been a part of Bavaria since the Peace of Pressburg in 1805. In 1818, through the Bavarian Municipality Edict ("Bayerische Gemeindeedikt"), the municipality of Pollenfeld was created. The incorporation of the municipalities of Seuversholz, Sornhüll, Wachenzell, Weigersdorf (all of the foregoing in 1972) and in part, also, in 1978, of Preith, followed thereafter in connection with district or regional reform in Bavaria.
