= Pförring =

- Municipality
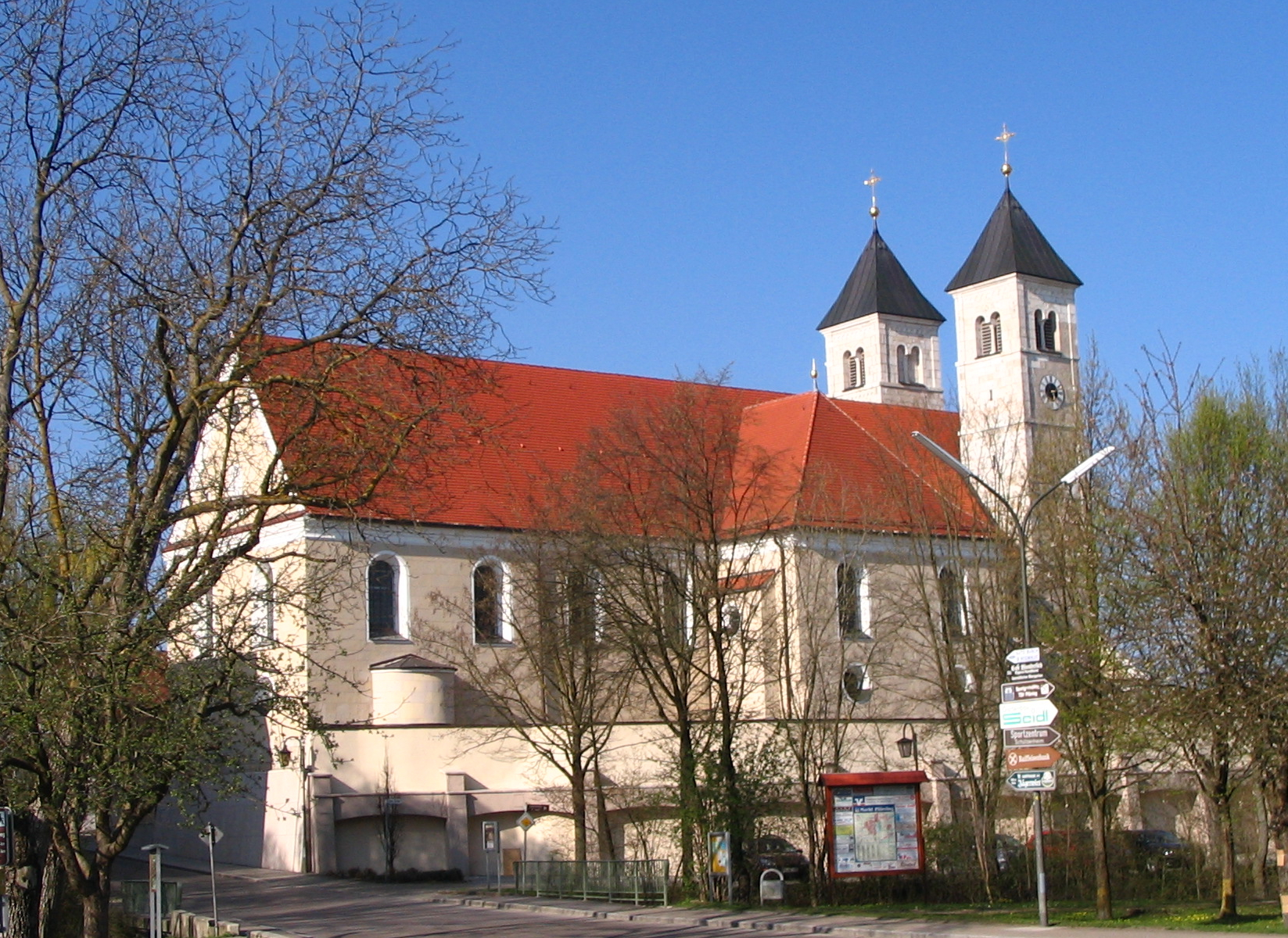
- Church of Saint Leonhard

- Coat of arms

- Location of Pförring within Eichstätt district
- Interactive map of Pförring
- Location within Germany Location within Bavaria
- Coordinates: 48°49′N 11°44′E
- Country: Germany
- State: Bavaria
- Admin. region: Oberbayern
- District: Eichstätt
- Municipal assoc.: Pförring

Government
  - Mayor (2020–26): Dieter Müller

Area
  - Total: 43.5 km^{2} (16.8 sq mi)
- Elevation: 356 m (1,168 ft)

Population (2025-12-31)
  - Total: 4,100
  - Density: 94/km^{2} (240/sq mi)
- Time zone: UTC+01:00 (CET)
  - Summer (DST): UTC+02:00 (CEST)
- Postal codes: 85104
- Dialling codes: 08403
- Vehicle registration: EI
- Website: www.pfoerring.de

Pförring (German pronunciation: [ˈpfœʁɪŋ]) is a municipality in the district of Eichstätt in Bavaria in Germany.
