= Walting, Eichstätt =

- Municipality
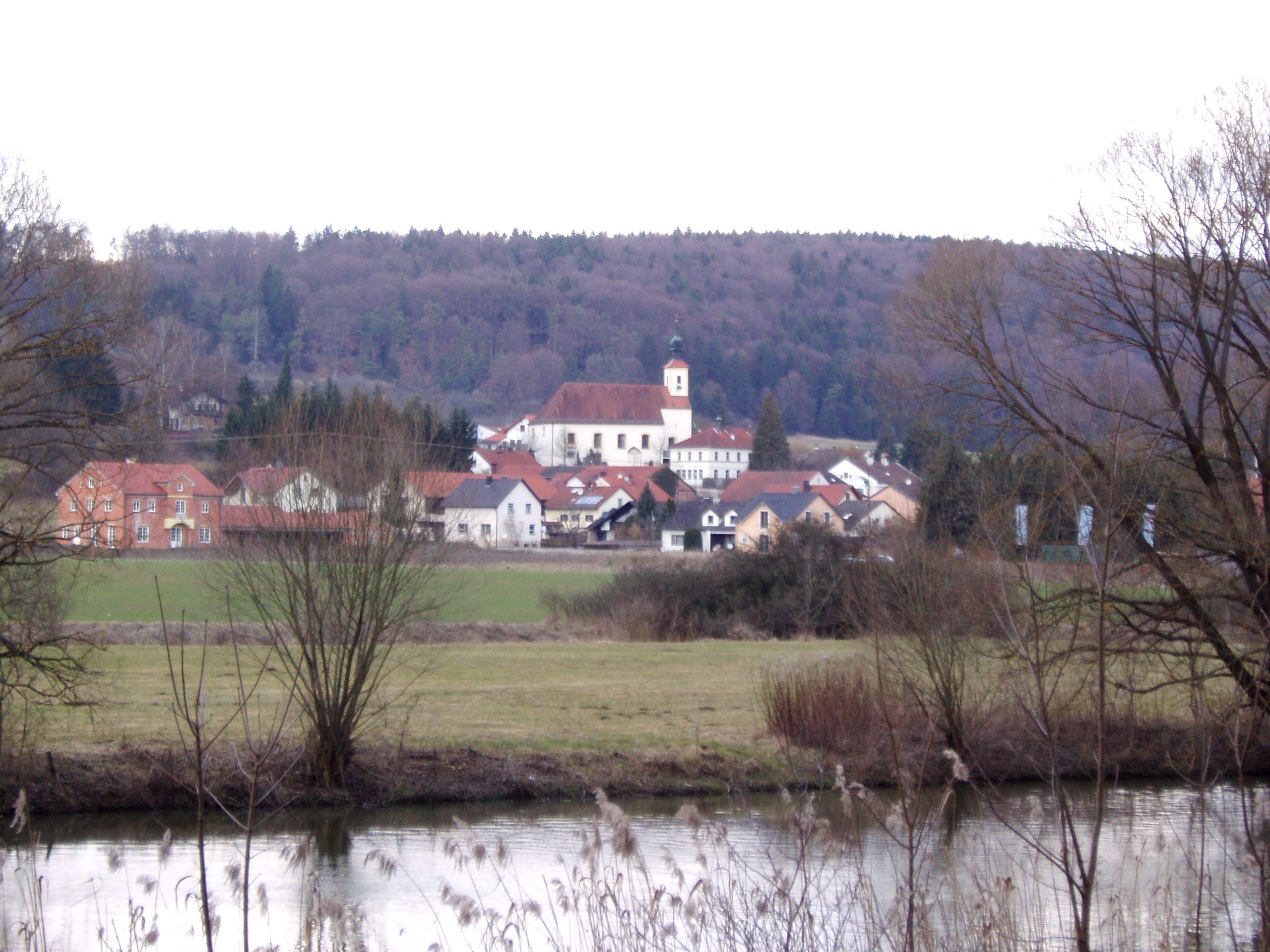

- Coat of arms

- Location of Walting, Eichstätt within Eichstätt district
- Interactive map of Walting, Eichstätt
- Location within Germany Location within Bavaria
- Coordinates: 48°55′N 11°18′E
- Country: Germany
- State: Bavaria
- Admin. region: Oberbayern
- District: Eichstätt
- Municipal assoc.: Eichstätt
- Subdivisions: 7 Ortsteile

Government
  - Mayor (2020–26): Roland Schermer (CSU)

Area
  - Total: 39.72 km^{2} (15.34 sq mi)
- Elevation: 395 m (1,296 ft)

Population (2025-12-31)
  - Total: 2,289
  - Density: 57.63/km^{2} (149.3/sq mi)
- Time zone: UTC+01:00 (CET)
  - Summer (DST): UTC+02:00 (CEST)
- Postal codes: 85137
- Dialling codes: 08426
- Vehicle registration: EI
- Website: Official website

Walting (German pronunciation: [ˈvaltɪŋ]) is a municipality and a village in the district of Eichstätt in Bavaria, Germany.

== See also ==
- Gungolding
