= Kleine Donau (Ilm) =

River in Germany

- The Kleine Donau in Neu-Ulm

Location
- Country: Germany
- State: Bavaria

Physical characteristics
- Mouth
  - location: Danube
  - coordinates: 48.7938°N 11.6908°E
- Length: 8.1 km (5.0 mi)

Basin features
- Progression: Danube→ Black Sea

Kleine Donau is a river of Bavaria, Germany. Originally a branch of the Danube, it does not receive water from the Danube anymore. It starts at the confluence of the Wellenbach and the Flutkanal Kleine Donau, a branch of the Ilm, near Vohburg. It flows into the Danube near Pförring.

== See also ==
- List of rivers of Bavaria
