= Mailinger Bach =

River in Germany

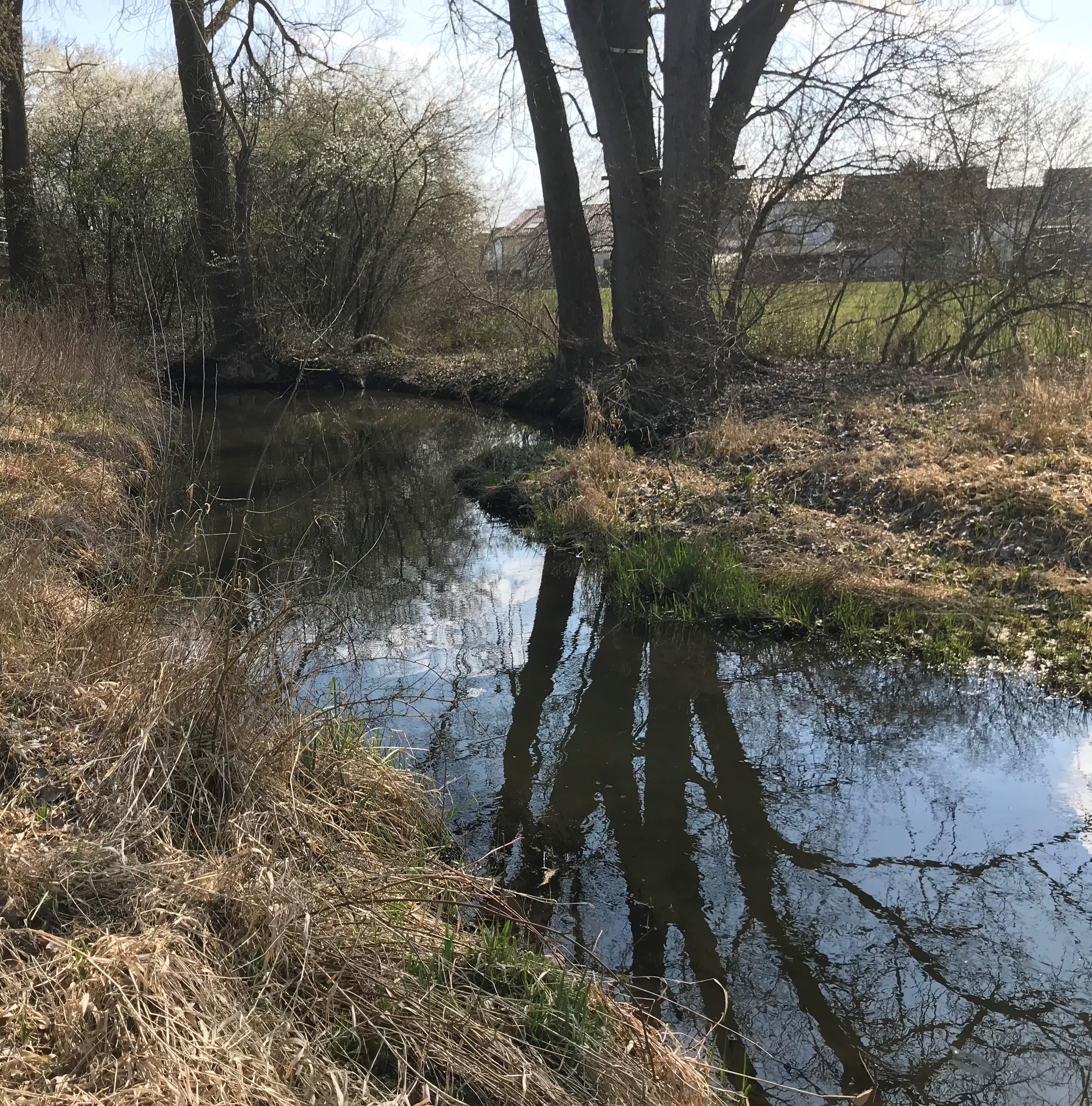
- The Mailinger Bach at Mailing (part of Ingolstadt)

Location
- Country: Germany
- State: Bavaria

Physical characteristics
- Mouth
  - location: Danube
  - coordinates: 48.7747°N 11.6114°E
- Length: 23.6 km (14.7 mi)

Basin features
- Progression: Danube→ Black Sea

Mailinger Bach is a river of Bavaria, Germany. It flows into the Danube near Vohburg.

== See also ==
- List of rivers of Bavaria
