= Wellenbach =

River in Germany

Location
- Country: Germany
- State: Bavaria

Physical characteristics
- Mouth
  - location: Kleine Donau
  - coordinates: 48°45′34″N 11°36′48″E
- Length: 20.4 km (12.7 mi)

Basin features
- Progression: Kleine Donau→ Danube→ Black Sea

Wellenbach is a river of Bavaria, Germany. It flows into the Kleine Donau near Vohburg.

== See also ==
- List of rivers of Bavaria
