= Stammham, Eichstätt =

Stammham
- Municipality
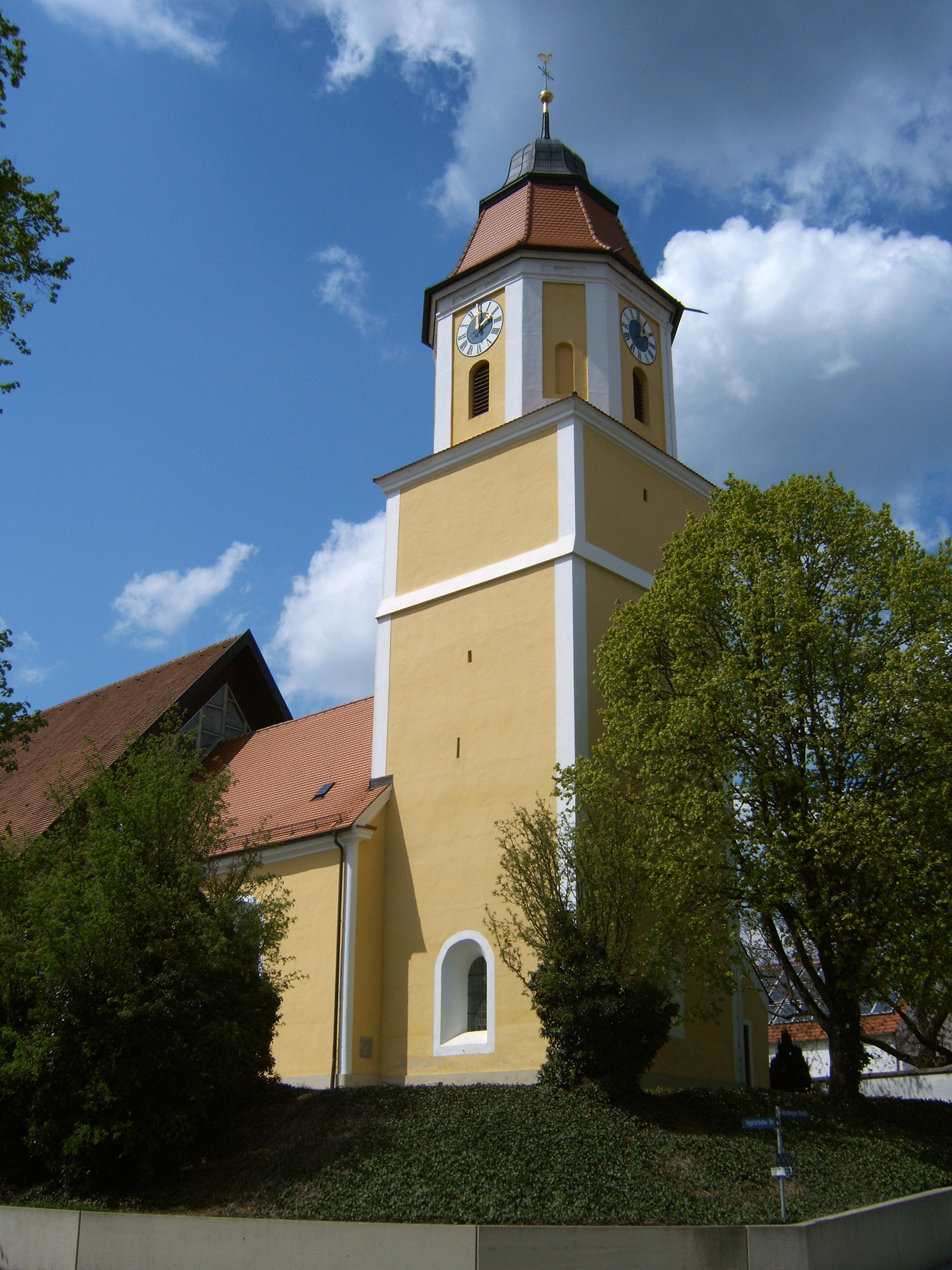
- Church of Saint Stephen

- Coat of arms

- Location of Stammham within Eichstätt district
- Interactive map of Stammham
- Location within Germany Location within Bavaria
- Coordinates: 48°51′N 11°28′E
- Country: Germany
- State: Bavaria
- Admin. region: Oberbayern
- District: Eichstätt
- Subdivisions: 5 Ortsteile

Government
  - Mayor (2020–26): Maria Weber (CSU)

Area
  - Total: 39.02 km^{2} (15.07 sq mi)
- Elevation: 483 m (1,585 ft)

Population (2025-12-31)
  - Total: 4,159
  - Density: 106.6/km^{2} (276.1/sq mi)
- Time zone: UTC+01:00 (CET)
  - Summer (DST): UTC+02:00 (CEST)
- Postal codes: 85134
- Dialling codes: 08405
- Vehicle registration: EI
- Website: www.stammham.de

Stammham (German pronunciation: [ˈʃtamham]) is a municipality in the district of Eichstätt in Bavaria in Germany.

== History ==
During the French invasion in Russia (1812) six men of Stammham lost their lives. 17 people died from cholera in 1873. During the First World War 26 men lost their lives. 1921 / 1922: electrification. During the Second World War 58 people lost their lives.
