= Gaimersheim =

- Municipality
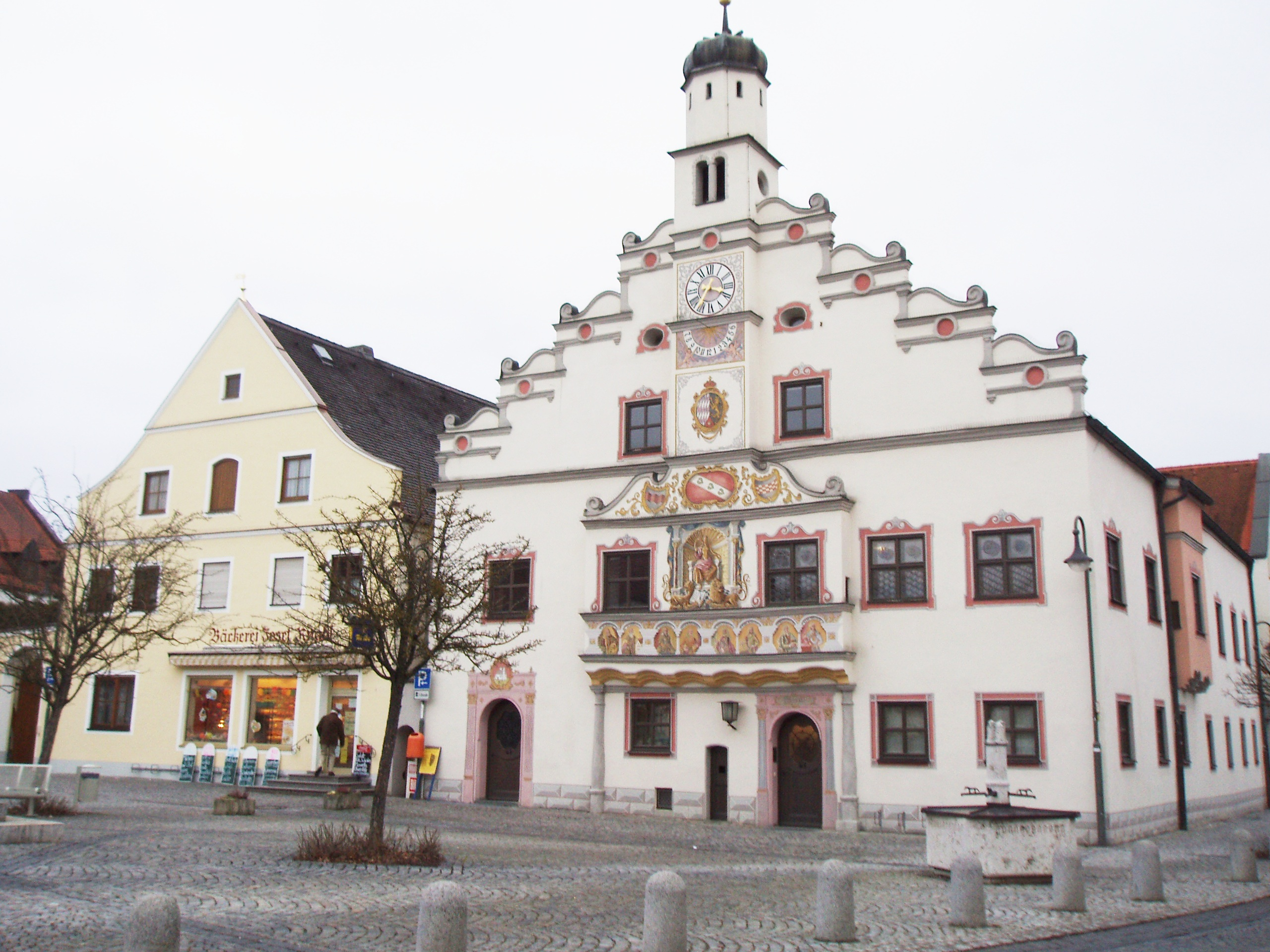
- Town hall

- Coat of arms

- Location of Gaimersheim within Eichstätt district
- Interactive map of Gaimersheim
- Location within Germany Location within Bavaria
- Coordinates: 48°49′N 11°22′E
- Country: Germany
- State: Bavaria
- Admin. region: Oberbayern
- District: Eichstätt
- Subdivisions: 3 Ortsteile

Government
  - Mayor (2020–26): Andrea Mickel (SPD)

Area
  - Total: 28.21 km^{2} (10.89 sq mi)
- Elevation: 384 m (1,260 ft)

Population (2025-12-31)
  - Total: 12,526
  - Density: 444.0/km^{2} (1,150/sq mi)
- Time zone: UTC+01:00 (CET)
  - Summer (DST): UTC+02:00 (CEST)
- Postal codes: 85080
- Dialling codes: 08458
- Vehicle registration: EI
- Website: www.gaimersheim.de

Gaimersheim (German pronunciation: [ˈɡaɪmɐshaɪm]) is a municipality in the district of Eichstätt, in Bavaria, Germany. It is situated 7 km northwest of Ingolstadt.

== Mayors ==
- 1946–1960: Sebastian Schiebel (CSU)
- 1960–1984: Martin Meier (SPD)
- 1984−2008: Anton Knapp (CSU)
- since 2008: Andrea Mickel (SPD)
