= Großmehring =

- Municipality
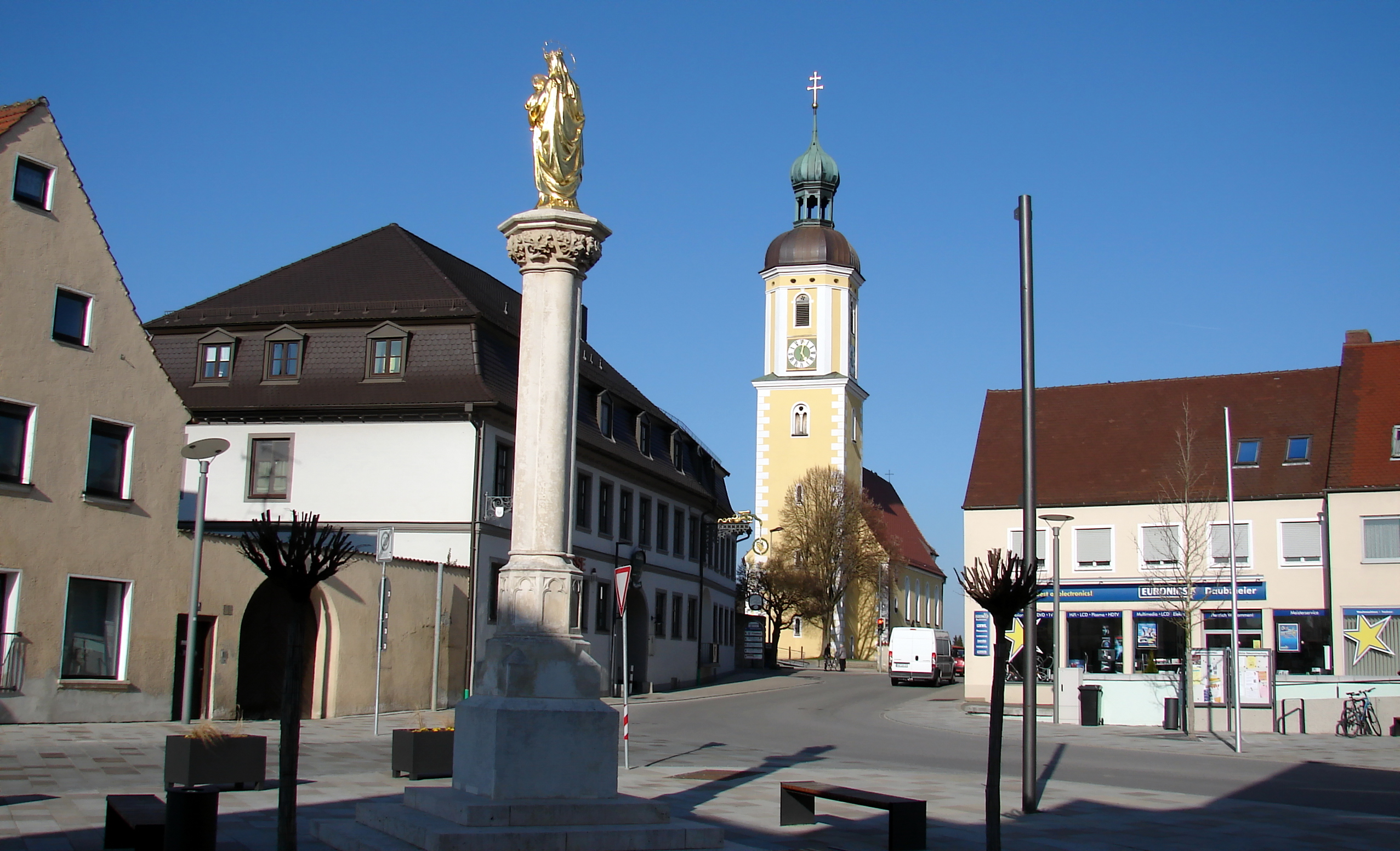
- Marian Square with the Marian column

- Coat of arms

- Location of Großmehring within Eichstätt district
- Interactive map of Großmehring
- Location within Germany Location within Bavaria
- Coordinates: 48°46′N 11°32′E
- Country: Germany
- State: Bavaria
- Admin. region: Oberbayern
- District: Eichstätt
- Subdivisions: 5 Ortsteile

Government
  - Mayor (2020–26): Rainer Stingl

Area
  - Total: 47.38 km^{2} (18.29 sq mi)
- Elevation: 375 m (1,230 ft)

Population (2025-12-31)
  - Total: 7,498
  - Density: 158.3/km^{2} (409.9/sq mi)
- Time zone: UTC+01:00 (CET)
  - Summer (DST): UTC+02:00 (CEST)
- Postal codes: 85098
- Dialling codes: 08407
- Vehicle registration: EI
- Website: www.grossmehring.de

Großmehring is a municipality in the district of Eichstätt in Bavaria in Germany.

== Mayors ==
- since 2020: Rainer Stingl
- 2008–2020: Ludwig Diepold (UW)
- 1990–2008: Horst Volkmer
