= Hitzhofen =

- Municipality
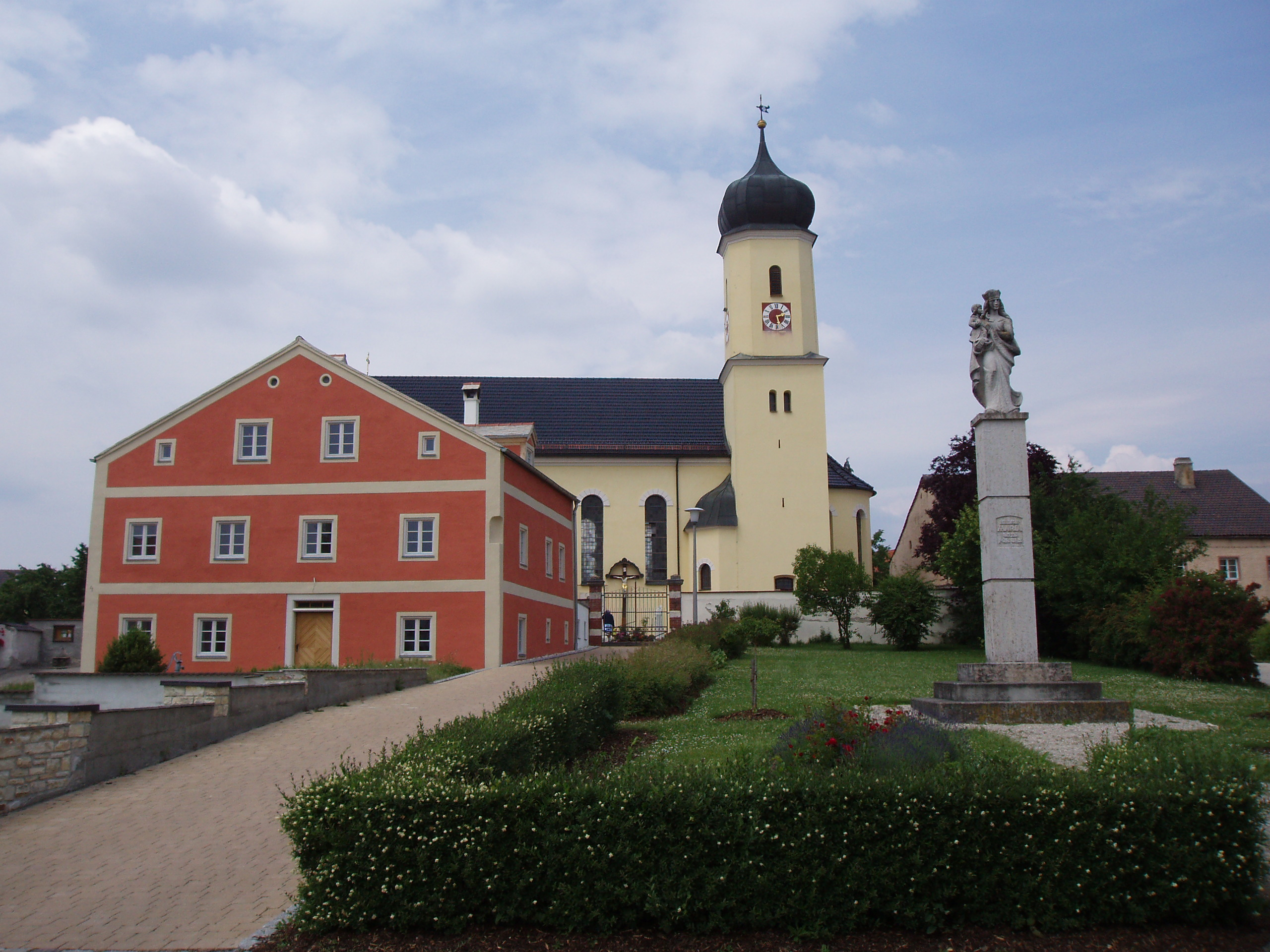
- Church of Saint Nicholas in Hofstetten

- Coat of arms

- Location of Hitzhofen within Eichstätt district
- Interactive map of Hitzhofen
- Location within Germany Location within Bavaria
- Coordinates: 48°51′N 11°19′E
- Country: Germany
- State: Bavaria
- Admin. region: Oberbayern
- District: Eichstätt
- Subdivisions: 3 Ortsteile

Government
  - Mayor (2020–26): Roland Sammüller (SPD)

Area
  - Total: 33.82 km^{2} (13.06 sq mi)
- Elevation: 445 m (1,460 ft)

Population (2025-12-31)
  - Total: 3,022
  - Density: 89.36/km^{2} (231.4/sq mi)
- Time zone: UTC+01:00 (CET)
  - Summer (DST): UTC+02:00 (CEST)
- Postal codes: 85122
- Dialling codes: 08458
- Vehicle registration: EI
- Website: https://www.hitzhofen.de/

Hitzhofen is a municipality in the district of Eichstätt in Bavaria in Germany.
