= Eichstätt (district) =

Coordinates: 48°55′N 11°20′E

Kreis Eichstätt
- District
- Flag Coat of arms
- Country: Germany
- State: Bavaria
- Adm. region: Upper Bavaria
- Capital: Eichstätt

Government
  - District admin.: Alexander Anetsberger (CSU)

Area
  - Total: 1,214 km^{2} (469 sq mi)

Population (31 December 2025)
  - Total: 135,982
  - Density: 112.0/km^{2} (290.1/sq mi)
- Time zone: UTC+01:00 (CET)
  - Summer (DST): UTC+02:00 (CEST)
- Vehicle registration: EI
- Website: landkreis-eichstaett.de

Eichstätt is a Landkreis (district) in Bavaria, Germany. It is bounded by (from the south and clockwise) the districts of Neuburg-Schrobenhausen, Donau-Ries, Weißenburg-Gunzenhausen, Roth, Neumarkt, Kelheim and Pfaffenhofen, and by the city of Ingolstadt.

== History ==
The district of Eichstätt in its present form was established in 1972 by merging the former district of Eichstätt with parts of the dissolved districts of Ingolstadt, Beilngries, Riedenburg and Hilpoltstein. The city of Eichstätt lost its status as a district-free city and became the capital of the new district. Today the Eichstätt district has powerful economic structures. The rate of jobless people is only 1.2% (June 2011).

== Geography ==
The district is located in the southern part of the Frankish Alb. 80% of the district are situated in the Altmühltal Nature Park. In the southeast the Danube forms a short part of the border.

== Coat of arms ==
The coat of arms displays:

- a torch, symbolising the industrial area within the metropolitan area of Ingolstadt
- a crosier, symbolising the bishopric of Eichstätt
- an antler, symbolising the medieval county of Hirschberg (German Hirsch = "deer")
- the blue and white checkered pattern of Bavaria

== Towns and municipalities ==
Clickable map of towns and municipalities in the district

Towns
1. Beilngries
2. Eichstätt
Märkte
1. Altmannstein
2. Dollnstein
3. Gaimersheim
4. Kinding
5. Kipfenberg
6. Kösching
7. Mörnsheim
8. Titting
Municipalities
1. Buxheim
2. Denkendorf
3. Großmehring
4. Hepberg
5. Hitzhofen
6. Lenting
7. Stammham
8. Wellheim
9. Wettstetten

Verwaltungsgemeinschaften
| 1. Eichstätt; 1. Pollenfeld; 2. Schernfeld; 3. Walting | 2. Eitensheim; 1. Böhmfeld; 2. Eitensheim^{1} | 3. Nassenfels; 1. Adelschlag; 2. Egweil; 3. Nassenfels^{1,2} | 4. Pförring; 1. Mindelstetten; 2. Oberdolling; 3. Pförring^{1,2} |
^{1}seat of the Verwaltungsgemeinschaft; ^{2}Markt
