= Kösching =

- Municipality
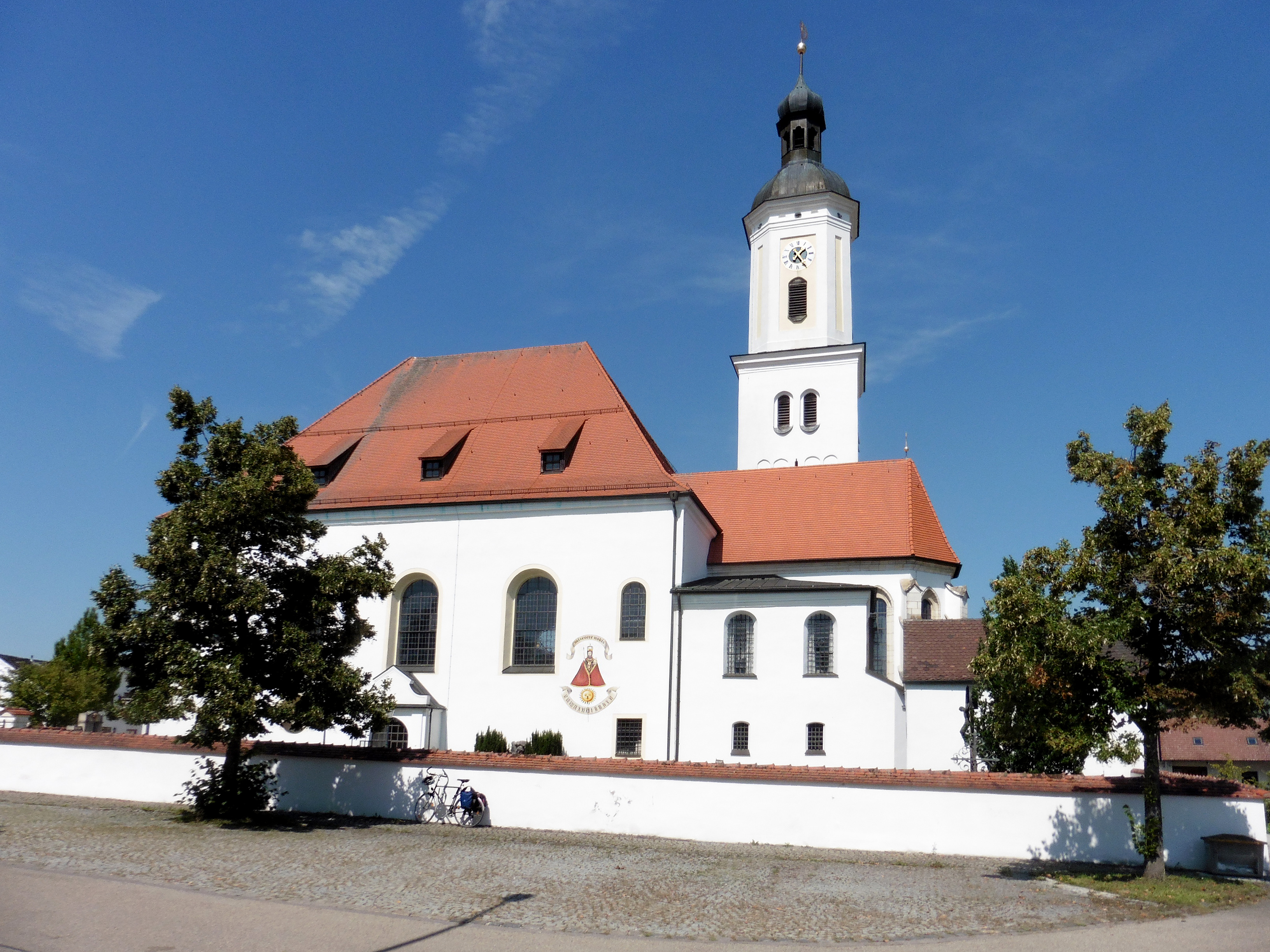
- Church of the Saviour in Bettbrunn

- Coat of arms

- Location of Kösching within Eichstätt district
- Interactive map of Kösching
- Location within Germany Location within Bavaria
- Coordinates: 48°49′N 11°30′E
- Country: Germany
- State: Bavaria
- Admin. region: Oberbayern
- District: Eichstätt

Government
  - Mayor (2020–26): Ralf Sitzmann (SPD)

Area
  - Total: 55.69 km^{2} (21.50 sq mi)
- Elevation: 390 m (1,280 ft)

Population (2025-12-31)
  - Total: 9,737
  - Density: 174.8/km^{2} (452.8/sq mi)
- Time zone: UTC+01:00 (CET)
  - Summer (DST): UTC+02:00 (CEST)
- Postal codes: 85092
- Dialling codes: 08456
- Vehicle registration: EI
- Website: www.koesching.de

Kösching (German pronunciation: [ˈkœʃɪŋ]) is a municipality in the district of Eichstätt in Bavaria in Germany.

== Personalities ==
- Richard Scheringer (1904-1986), communist politician
- Johanna Scheringer-Wright (born 1963) politician (The Left), member of the Landtag of Thuringia
- Serkan Atak (born 1984), German-Turkish footballer
- Rudolf Winterstein (1920-2000), Heimatpfleger
