= House of Helfenstein =

Noble family

Helfenstein
- Country: County of Helfenstein
- Founded: Around 1100
- Founder: Eberhard of Helfenstein
- Final ruler: Georg I (Helfenstein-Blaubeuren)/Rudolph II (Helfenstein-Wiesensteig)
- Titles: Count, Freiherr, Herr
- Dissolution: Helfenstein-Blaubeuren in 1517, Helfenstein-Wiesensteig on 20 September 1627
- Cadet branches: Helfenstein-Blaubeuren, Helfenstein-Wiesensteig

The House of Helfenstein was a German noble family during the High and Late Middle Ages. The family was named after the family castle, Castle Helfenstein, located above Geislingen an der Steige in the Swabian Alb region of Baden-Württemberg, Germany. The family held the rank of Graf or Count and was very significant in the 13th and 14th Centuries, but fell into financial difficulties and the family lost its estate in 1627.

== Coat of arms ==
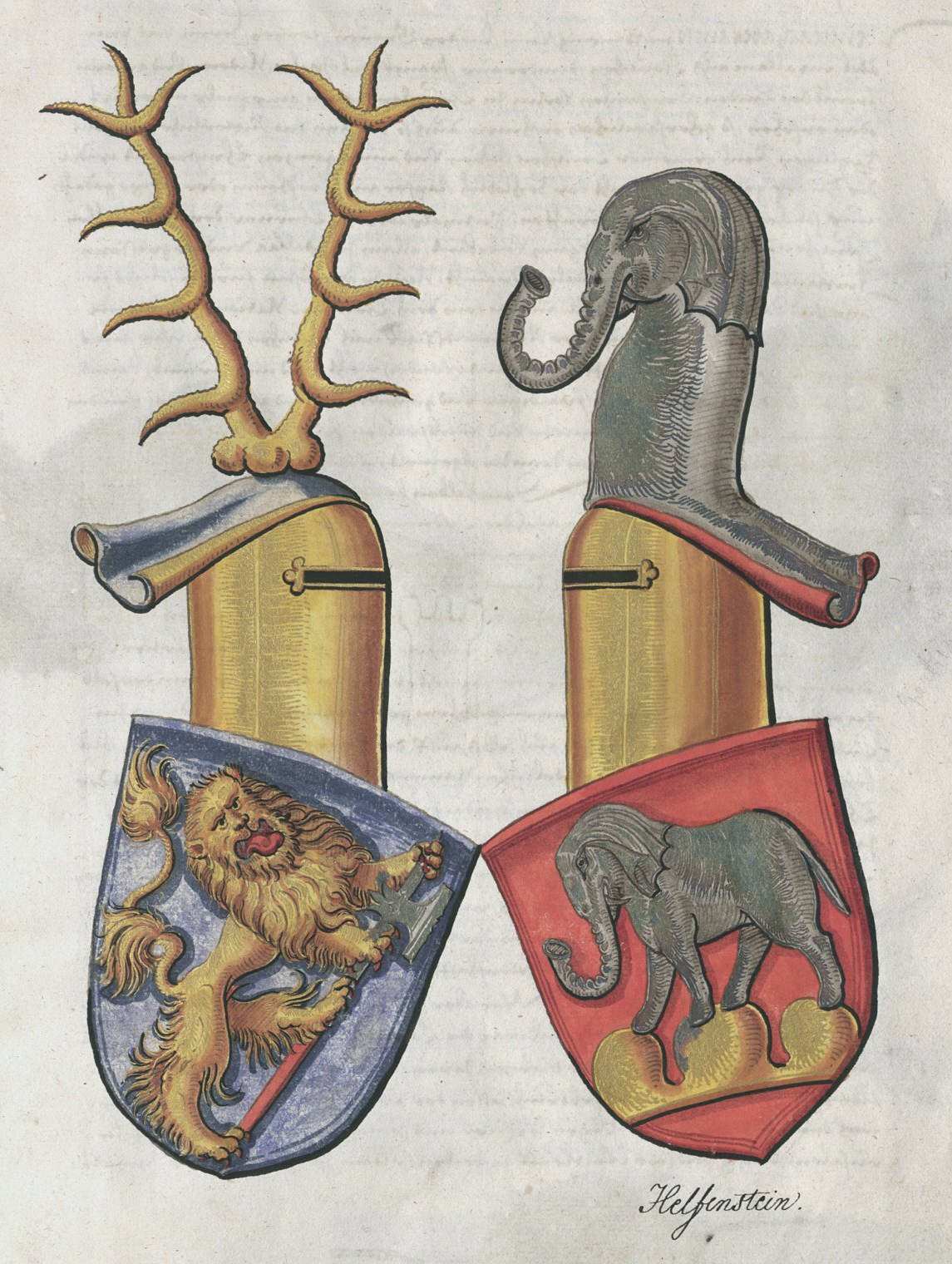
Arms of alliance following the marriage of a member of the House of Zimmern to the Countess of Helfenstein, showing the Helfenstein Coat of Arms on the right

The House of Helfenstein used an elephant on their coat of arms. According to one source, the elephant is a type of Canting Arms (German:Redendes Wappen, Sprechendes Wappen), in this case Helfenstein became Elefanten or elephant because of similarity between the sounds. A more fanciful source claims that the elephant comes from the first ancestor of the family, Helfrich, a citizen of Rome in 225 AD, a captain of the 5th Legion of Veterans based in Germany and the Lord of the Fils River. Helfrich acquired an elephant for his coat of arms. Their emblem depicted an elephant and was awarded in 46 BC for bravery against a charge of elephants in the Battle of Thapsus.

== History ==
While the ancestral castle, Burg Helfenstein, was built around 1100 the family may originate about three centuries earlier. Ulric Helfenstein was appointed Second Provost at an earlier Blaubeuren Abbey by Charlemagne in 800. His son Rudolf was born around 820. On 12 December 861 he founded the church at Wiesensteig. Later he also founded the Cyriasus Abbey in Wiesensteig.

It is possible that the Counts from Vils (Fils) were the ancestors of the House of Helfenstein, because in 1060 the Archbishop of Salzburg, Gebhard of Salzburg (from the Counts of Vils) was also known as Gebhard von Helfenstein. This connection is debated.

The first recorded member of the family was Eberhard the Elder, who built the ancestral castle known as Burg Helfenstein (English: Helfenstein Castle) around 1100. Helfenstein castle was located at a key point along the imperial road from Brabant to Italy. This allowed the Counts of Helfenstein to guard and tax travellers and merchants. The city of Geislingen an der Steige grew up at the foot of the castle as a toll collection station and rest stop for travellers.

Around 1200 Count Ludwig IV of Spitzenberg (near Kuchen) and Sigmaringen married the heir of Eberhard II (known as the Younger) of Helfenstein, his daughter. Through the marriage to the heir of Helfenstein family, the fortunes of both families were intertwined. The Counts of Spitzenberg were closely allied with the Holy Roman Emperor and had served the Empire in a variety of positions. Ludwig's brother, Gottfried, had marched with Frederick Barbarossa on the Third Crusade and had died on the Crusade in 1190. The Spitzenberg male line died out completely a generation later in 1226. This meant that the Helfenstein lands and the Spitzenburg lands would be combined and Ludwig IV of Spitzenburg became Ludwing I of Helfenstein. He quickly expanded his county, adding numerous holdings in the upper and middle Fils River Valley, on the highlands of the Swabian Alb, in Ulm, in Heidenheim an der Brenz as well as in the Danube River Valley near Sigmaringen and Schloss Sigmaringen.

The next significant Helfenstein count was Ulrich V, who as a member of Emperor Charles IV's household in 14th century Prague served the Emperor in many ways. The Emperor rewarded him with a marriage, which raised his social status, to Maria of Bosnia. This marriage led to many problems and caused the financial downfall of the Helfenstein family.

The collapse of the House of Hohenstaufen (Kings of Germany from 1138 to 1254) threw southern Germany into chaos. For nearly two centuries, each noble fought against the others. The Helfenstein family joined the conflicts. In 1356 Ulrich V (known as Ulrich the Elder) and his cousin Ulrich VI (known as Ulrich the Younger), split the House of Helfenstein into two lines; the Wiesensteiger and Blaubeurer branches. The Wiesensteiger branch inherited the county of Geislingen with Burg Helfenstein, but pledged the entire holding to the Free Imperial City of Ulm in 1382 for a loan. In 1396 the city called for repayment, but the House of Helfenstein owed at least 123,439 Gulden to the city. To repay the loan, most of the County of Geislingen including the ancestral castle and 27 villages or hamlets were given to Ulm.

The Blaubeuren branch lost most of their property to the House of Württemberg in 1448 when Württemberg acquired Heidenheim. In 1450 Württemberg acquired the Wiesensteig holdings from Ulm, but lost those holdings seven years later in 1457. The Wiesensteig lands would later pass to Bavaria from 1642 until 1752. Bavaria had already owned the Blaubeuren lands including Heidenheim from 1450 until 1504, but in 1504 Bavaria gave the Blaubeuren lands to Württemberg.

Following the loss of their lands, the House of Helfenstein lost all political power. The last male member of the family died in 1627 in Wiesensteig, which signified the end of this family name.

== Rulers ==
=== House of Helfenstein ===
Partitions of Helfenstein under Helfenstein rule

County of Spitzenberg (1200–1296)	County of Helfenstein (1120–1315)	County of Sigmaringen (1200–1263)
County of Blaubeuren (1315–1517)
County of Gundelfingen (1548–1629)	County of Wiesensteig (1315–1678)
To Fürstenberg
Divided between Fürstenberg and Oettingen-Baldern

Table of rulers

Ruler	Born	Reign	Ruling part	Consort	Death	Notes
Eberhard I the Elder	c.1070 Son of ?	c.1100 – 1120	County of Helfenstein	Unknown at least one child	c.1120 aged 49-50?	Founder of the family and the county.
Eberhard II the Younger	c.1100 Son of Eberhard I	c.1120 – 1171	County of Helfenstein	Unknown at least one child	1171 aged 70-71?	
Louis I	c.1140/50 Son of Rudolf of Sigmaringen-Spitzenberg	1170 – c.1200	County of Helfenstein	? of Helfenstein (c.1140/50-?) at least four children	c.1200 aged 50-60?	Son-in-law of his predecessor.
Ulrich I	c.1170 First son of Louis I	c.1200 – 1241	County of Helfenstein	Anna of Henneberg three children	1241 aged 70-71	Children of Louis I, divided the land.
Rudolf I	c.1170 Second son of Louis I	c.1200 – 1212	County of Helfenstein	Unmarried	1212 aged 41-42	Children of Louis I, divided the land.
Eberhard III	c.1170 Third son of Louis I	c.1200 – 1229	County of Spitzenberg	Unknown two children	1229 aged 58-59	Children of Louis I, divided the land.
Godfried I	c.1170 Fourth son of Louis I	c.1200 – 2 February 1241	County of Sigmaringen	Adelaide of Neuffen (d.1240) four children	2 February 1241 aged 70-71	Children of Louis I, divided the land.
Louis II	c.1210 Son of Eberhard III	1229 – 1278	County of Spitzenberg	Unknown at least two children	1278 aged 67-68	
Godfried II	c.1190 First son of Godfried I and Adelaide of Neuffen	2 February 1241 – 1263	County of Sigmaringen	Unknown	1263 aged 72-73	Children of Godfried I, ruled jointly. Had no descendants, and Sigmaringen reverted to Helfenstein.
Gebhard	c.1190 Second son of Godfried I and Adelaide of Neuffen	2 February 1241 – 1253	County of Sigmaringen	Unknown	1253 aged 62-63	Children of Godfried I, ruled jointly. Had no descendants, and Sigmaringen reverted to Helfenstein.
Sigmaringen re-merged in Helfenstein
Ulrich II	1224; Son of Ulrich I and Anna of Henneberg	1241 – 17 May 1294	County of Helfenstein	Willibirg of Dillingen (1226–1268) c.1250? three children Agnes of Tubingen-Herenberg; 1267 no children	17 May 1294 aged 69-70	
Eberhard IV	c.1230 Son of Louis II	1278 – 8 June 1296	County of Spitzenberg	Catherine of Toggenburg (d.18 February 1313) two children	8 June 1296 aged 65-66	Left no male descendants, and Spitzenberg reverted to Helfenstein.
Spitzenberg re-merged in Helfenstein
Ulrich III	c.1250 Son of Ulrich II and Willibirg of Dillingen	17 May 1294 – 1315	County of Helfenstein	Adelaide of Greisbach (c.1260-23 May 1291); 1286; Greisbach five children Margaret of Toggenburg (d.c.1296); 23 May 1291 one child	1315 aged 64-65?	Children of Ulrich II, divided their inheritance. Agnes received Sigmaringen as dowry, and it was then annexed to the County of Montfort.
Agnes	c.1250 Daughter of Ulrich II and Willibirg of Dillingen	17 May 1294 – 1300	County of Helfenstein (at Sigmaringen)	Ulrich I, Count of Montfort-Bregenz c.1270 two children	c.1300 aged 49-50?	Children of Ulrich II, divided their inheritance. Agnes received Sigmaringen as dowry, and it was then annexed to the County of Montfort.
John I	1287; Second son of Ulrich III and Adelaide of Greisbach	1315 – 27 October 1331	County of Wiesensteig	Adelaide of Hohenlohe-Weikersheim (c.1310-17 March 1356); 1313 four children	27 October 1331 aged 43-44	Children of Ulrich III, divided their inheritance.
Ulrich IV	c.1290 Third son of Ulrich III and Adelaide of Greisbach	1315 – December 1326	County of Blaubeuren	Agnes of Württemberg (1294-12 February 1373); 1318 three children	December 1326 aged 35-36	Children of Ulrich III, divided their inheritance.
Regency of Agnes of Württemberg (1326-1334)						
Ulrich VI the Younger	c.1320 Son of Ulrich IV and Agnes of Württemberg	December 1326 – 13 May 1361	County of Blaubeuren	Beatrice of Schlüselberg (d.24 January 1355); 14 August 1348 three children	13 May 1361 aged 40-41	
Ulrich V the Elder	c.1314 Wiesensteig; Son of John I and Adelaide of Hohenlohe-Weikersheim	27 October 1331 – 7 April 1372	County of Wiesensteig	Maria of Bosnia; 26 April 1352 nine children	7 April 1372 aged 57-58	
Ulrich VII	c.1350 Son of Ulrich VI and Beatrice of Schlüselberg	13 May 1361 – 3 July 1375	County of Blaubeuren	Anna of Oettingen (d. 1410/11); 1363 three children	3 July 1375 aged 24-25	Children of Ulrich VI. While Ulrich VII received the county, Anna was given a dowry of the towns of Faimingen and Falkenstein, which she sold respectively in 1383 and 1390.
Anna	c.1350 Daughter of Ulrich VI and Beatrice of Schlüselberg	13 May 1361 – 1390	County of Blaubeuren (at Falkenstein and Faimingen)	Frederick III, Duke of Teck; 1359 thirteen children	18 November 1392 aged 41-42	Children of Ulrich VI. While Ulrich VII received the county, Anna was given a dowry of the towns of Faimingen and Falkenstein, which she sold respectively in 1383 and 1390.
Frederick I	c.1360 First son of Ulrich V and Maria of Bosnia	7 April 1372 – 20 August 1438	County of Wiesensteig	Agnes of Weinsberg (1400–1474); 1405 eight children	20 August 1438 aged 77-78	Children of Ulrich V, ruled jointly. Conrad and Ulrich were priests at Konstanz and Strasbourg.
Conrad I	c.1360 Second son of Ulrich V and Maria of Bosnia	7 April 1372 – 1402	County of Wiesensteig	Unmarried	1402	Children of Ulrich V, ruled jointly. Conrad and Ulrich were priests at Konstanz and Strasbourg.
Ulrich VIII	c.1360 Third son of Ulrich V and Maria of Bosnia	7 April 1372 – 1375	County of Wiesensteig	Unmarried	1375 aged 14-15?	Children of Ulrich V, ruled jointly. Conrad and Ulrich were priests at Konstanz and Strasbourg.
John II	c.1365 Son of Ulrich VII and Anna of Oettingen	1375 – 27 February 1444	County of Blaubeuren	Irmgard of Kirchberg-Wullenstetten (d.3 March 1444); 1407 eight children	27 February 1444; Blaubeuren aged 78-79	
Frederick II	1408; First son of Frederick I and Agnes of Weinsberg	20 August 1438 – 1483	County of Wiesensteig	Agnes of Eberstein (d. 2 November 1456); 1446 one child Irmgard of Helfenstein-Blaubeuren; 1476 one child	1483 aged 74-75	Children of Frederick I, ruled jointly.
Ulrich IX	c.1410 Second son of Frederick I and Agnes of Weinsberg	20 August 1438 – 30 June 1462	County of Wiesensteig	Unmarried	30 June 1462 aged 51-52	Children of Frederick I, ruled jointly.
Louis III	c.1415 Third son of Frederick I and Agnes of Weinsberg	20 August 1438 – 9 January 1493	County of Wiesensteig	Amalia of Oettingen-Wallerstein (d.24 March 1487); 8 October 1472 no children	9 January 1493 aged 77-78?	Children of Frederick I, ruled jointly.
Ulrich X	c.1410 First son of John II and Irmgard of Kirchberg-Wullenstetten	27 February 1444 – 15 July 1503	County of Blaubeuren (in Heidenheim until 1448; in Hexenagger and Wellheim since 1458)	Unmarried	15 July 1503 aged 92-93?	Children of John II, ruled jointly. Lost Blaubeuren in 1447; they bought in compensation the lordships of Hexenagger and Wellheim.
Conrad II	c.1410 Second son of John II and Irmgard of Kirchberg-Wullenstetten	27 February 1444 – 14 December 1474	County of Blaubeuren (in Heidenheim until 1448; in Hexenagger and Wellheim since 1458)	Ursula of Seckendorf (d.23 November 1474) c.1440? thirteen children	14 December 1474 aged 63-64	Children of John II, ruled jointly. Lost Blaubeuren in 1447; they bought in compensation the lordships of Hexenagger and Wellheim.
Louis IV	21 November 1447; Son of Frederick II and Agnes of Eberstein	9 January – 27 December 1493	County of Wiesensteig	Elisabeth of Limburg-Speckfeld (d.1538); 1483 seven children	27 December 1493 aged 45-46	Son of Frederick II, ruled with his uncle since 1483, and from 1492 ruled alone.
Frederick III	12 March 1479; Son of Frederick II and Irmgard of Helfenstein-Blaubeuren	27 December 1493 – 1502	County of Wiesensteig	Barbara of Rechberg (d.15 April 1522); 8 November 1497 no children	1502 aged 22-23	Brother of Louis IV.
Ulrich XI	20 July 1486; First son of Louis IV and Elisabeth of Limburg-Speckfeld	1502 – 22 May 1548	County of Wiesensteig	Catherine of Waldburg-Sonnenberg (21 October 1495 – 14 October 1563); 20 January 1512 thirteen children	22 May 1548 aged 61	Children of Louis IV, ruled jointly (and possibly with their uncle Frederick III since 1493). Louis Elfrich was mercilessly killed in the German Peasants' War.
Louis Elfrich	13 November 1493; Second son of Louis IV and Elisabeth of Limburg-Speckfeld	1502 – 17 April 1525	County of Wiesensteig	Margareta of Edelsheim, Bastard of Austria (1480-June 1537); 1497 two children	17 April 1525; Weinsberg aged 31	Children of Louis IV, ruled jointly (and possibly with their uncle Frederick III since 1493). Louis Elfrich was mercilessly killed in the German Peasants' War.
George I	c.1440 Son of Conrad II and Ursula of Seckendorf	15 July 1503 – 1517	County of Blaubeuren (in Hexenagger and Wellenheim)	Cecilia of Truchtelfingen no children Elisabeth of Limburg-Speckfeld (d.1538); 23 November 1495 eight children	1517 aged 76-77	Co-ruled with his uncle Ulrich X since 1474. With his death without male heirs, the few possessions left may have been inherited by Wiesensteig line.
Blaubeuren annexed to Wiesensteig
George II	7 November 1518; Bamberg; First son of Ulrich XI and Catherine of Waldburg-Sonnenberg	22 May 1548 – 17 November 1573	County of Gundelfingen	Marie de Bonnard (d. 12 February 1565); 4 May 1536; Bamberg six children Apollonia of Zimmern-Meßkirch (1547-31 July 1604); 13 October 1567; Meßkirch two children	17 November 1573; Neufra (Riedlingen) aged 55	Children of Ulrich XI, ruled jointly with their cousin Maximilian, Louis Elfrich's son. The eldest of Ulrich's sons ruled a separate estate at Gundelfingen. Ulrich XII's wife re-introduced Catholicism in Helfenstein lands.
Sebastian	21 September 1521; Second son of Ulrich XI and Catherine of Waldburg-Sonnenberg	22 May 1548 – 16 May 1564	County of Wiesensteig (in Wellheim)	Maria of the Mark (d.10 July 1563); 1552 four children Maria Haven (d.1587); 21 September 1563 one child	16 May 1564 aged 42	Children of Ulrich XI, ruled jointly with their cousin Maximilian, Louis Elfrich's son. The eldest of Ulrich's sons ruled a separate estate at Gundelfingen. Ulrich XII's wife re-introduced Catholicism in Helfenstein lands.
Ulrich XII	8 February 1524; Third son of Ulrich XI and Catherine of Waldburg-Sonnenberg	22 May 1548 – 17 January 1570	County of Wiesensteig	Catherine of Montfort-Rothenfels (25 February 1536 – 26 December 1594); 1551 no children	17 January 1570 aged 45	Children of Ulrich XI, ruled jointly with their cousin Maximilian, Louis Elfrich's son. The eldest of Ulrich's sons ruled a separate estate at Gundelfingen. Ulrich XII's wife re-introduced Catholicism in Helfenstein lands.
Maximilian	1522; Son of Louis Elfrich and Margareta of Edelsheim	22 May 1548 – 15 June 1555	County of Wiesensteig	Unmarried	15 June 1555; 32-33	Children of Ulrich XI, ruled jointly with their cousin Maximilian, Louis Elfrich's son. The eldest of Ulrich's sons ruled a separate estate at Gundelfingen. Ulrich XII's wife re-introduced Catholicism in Helfenstein lands.
Rudolf II	24 March 1560; Son of Sebastian and Maria of the Mark	17 January 1570 – 18 February 1601	County of Wiesensteig	Anna Maria of Staufen (d.2 September 1600); 10 June 1582 six children Anna Constantia of Fürstenberg-Heiligenberg (2 April 1577–1659); 18 February 1601 no children	18 February 1601 aged 40	Inherited his father's property in 1564, and then his uncle's, in 1570.
Schweikhard	26 June 1539; Neufra (Riedlingen); Son of George II and Marie de Bonnard	17 November 1573 – 23 October 1599	County of Gundelfingen	Maria of Hohenzollern-Sigmaringen (28 August 1544 – 13 December 1611); February 1561 no children	23 October 1599; Landsberg am Lech aged 60	
Froben Christoph	1573; First son of George II and Apollonia of Zimmern-Meßkirch	23 October 1599 – 4 December 1622	County of Gundelfingen	Maria of Helfenstein-Wiesensteig (26 March 1586 – 27 September 1634); 1 November 1603 two children	4 December 1622; Ensisheim aged 48-49	Brothers of Schweikhard, ruled jointly.
George III	c.1570 Second son of George II and Apollonia of Zimmern-Meßkirch	23 October 1599 – 29 March 1607	County of Gundelfingen	Unmarried	29 March 1607 aged 36-37	Brothers of Schweikhard, ruled jointly.
Rudolf III	7 March 1585; Son of Rudolf II and Anna Maria of Staufen	18 February 1601 – 21 September 1627	County of Wiesensteig	Eleonora of Fürstenberg (13 May 1578 – 12 April 1651); 22 August 1604 nine children	21 September 1627 aged 42	
George William	19 January 1605; Son of Froben Christoph and Maria of Helfenstein-Wiesensteig	4 December 1622 – 31 May 1627	County of Gundelfingen	Euphrosyne Sibylla of Hohenzollern-Sigmaringen (15 June 1607 – 25 July 1636); 16 October 1622; Sigmaringen no children	31 May 1627; Venice aged 22	Children of Froben Christoph, ruled jointly. George William inherited the county, and his sister Johanna inherited property at Meßkirch.
Johanna Eleonora	18 October 1606; Daughter of Froben Christoph and Maria of Helfenstein-Wiesensteig	4 December 1622 – 28 July 1629	County of Gundelfingen (at Meßkirch)	Wratislaus II, Count of Fürstenberg; 10 June 1622 five children	28 July 1629 aged 23	Children of Froben Christoph, ruled jointly. George William inherited the county, and his sister Johanna inherited property at Meßkirch.
Gundelfingen annexed to Fürstenberg
Maria Johanna	8 September 1612; First daughter of Rudolf III and Eleonora of Fürstenberg	21 September 1627 – 20 August 1665	County of Wiesensteig	Maximilian Adam, Landgrave of Leuchtenberg c.1630 no children Christian I, Count Palatine of Birkenfeld-Bischweiler; 28 October 1648 no children	20 August 1665 aged 52	Children of Rudolf III, divided the land, which was inherited by each of their families.
Isabella Eleonora	c.1615 Second daughter of Rudolf III and Eleonora of Fürstenberg	21 September 1627 – 22 March 1678	County of Wiesensteig	Martin Francis, Count of Oettingen-Baldern; 1629 two children	22 March 1678 aged 62-63	Children of Rudolf III, divided the land, which was inherited by each of their families.
Franziska Carolina	c.1615 Third daughter of Rudolf III and Eleonora of Fürstenberg	21 September 1627 – 31 December 1641	County of Wiesensteig	Wratislaus II, Count of Fürstenberg; 3 October 1636 three children	31 December 1641 aged 25-26	Children of Rudolf III, divided the land, which was inherited by each of their families.
Wiesensteig divided between Fürstenberg and Oettingen-Baldern. The Elector of Bavaria became Count of Helfenstein.

== Members ==
=== Counts ===
- Eberhard I the Elder (fl.1100)
- Eberhard II the Younger (fl.1200)
- Ulrich II (d.17 V 1294), m. Agnes von Tübingen

==== Helfenstein-Wiesensteigen branch ====
- Ulrich V the Elder (d.7 IV 1372) m. Maria of Bosnia (1333–1403)
- Ulrich VIII (d.1375)
- Friedrich I (d. 20 VIII 1438) m. Agnes von Weisberg
- Friedrich II (1408–1483) m. Agnes von Eberstein (d.1456) and Irmgard von Helfenstein-Blaubeuren
- Ludwig (21 XI 1447 – 27 XII 1493) m. Elisabeth von Limpurg-Speckfeld (1466–1538)
- Friedrich III (III 1479–1502) m. Barbara von Rechberg (d.15 IV 1522)
- Ludwig I Helfrich (1493-IV 1525) m. Margarethe von Edelsheim (1497-VI 1537)
- Ulrich XI (1490-26 V 1548), m. Katharina von Waldburg-Sonnenberg (21 X 1495-14 X 1563)
- Ulrich XIII (8 II 1524 – 17 I 1570) m. Katharina von Monfort (d.26 XII 1594)

==== Helfenstein-Blaubeuren branch ====
- Ulrich VI the Younger (d.13 V 1361) m. Beatrix von Schlüsselberg (d. 24 I 1355)
  - Ulrich VII (d. 1375) m. Anna of Oettingen (d.1360)
    - Johann II (d. 27 II 1444) m. Irmgard von Kirchberg (d.3 III 1444)
      - Ulrich X
      - Anna (1430-6 XI 1472) m. Wilhelm II von Castell (1425-7 VIII 1479)
      - Konrad II (d. 14 XII 1474) m. Anna von Seckendorf (d. 23 XI 1474)
        - Georg I (d.1517) m. Cecilia of Truchtelfingen (1) and Elisabeth von Limpurg-Speckfeld (2) (1466–1538)
          - Ursula (1496–1576)
          - Magdalena (b.1497)
          - Wilhelm (b.1498)
          - Agatha (b.1502)
          - Dorothea (b.1503)
          - Wilhelm (b.1506)
          - Anna
        - Irmgard m. Friedrich II von Helfenstein-Wiesensteigen (1408–1483)(view above)
        - Hans IV (d.1483)
        - Ursula
        - Bernhard (d.1501)
        - Ernst (d.XI 1483)
        - Wolfgang
        - Cecilia
        - Magdalena
        - Friedrich
        - Sibylla (d. 11 V 1487)
        - Christoph
        - Anna
    - Anna
    - Agnes m. Heinrich von Rechberg
  - Wulfhild
- Georg II von Helfenstein (7 XI 1518-17 XI 1573) m. Maria de Bowart (d.1565) and Apollonia von Zimmern-Mösskirch (1547 – 31 VII 1604)
- Schweikhard von Helfenstein (26 VI 1539–1599) m. Maria von Hohenzollern (28 VIII 1544 – 13 XII 1611)

=== Other ===
- Adelheid von Helfenstein (fl.1356)
- Irmel von Helfenstein (fl.1444)
- Barbara von Helfenstein (1552–1605)
- Magdalena von Helfenstein (1562–1622)
- Katharina von Helfenstein (1563–1627)

== See also ==
- Castle Helfenstein
