= Gießgraben =

Gießgraben may refer to:

- Gießgraben (Danube), a river of Lower Austria, tributary of the Danube
- Gießgraben (Schutter), a river of Bavaria, Germany, tributary of the Schutter
- Gießgraben (Zusam), a river of Bavaria, Germany, tributary of the Zusam
