= Aria meierottii =

- Aria meierottii in the southern Franconian Jura

Conservation status
- Critically Endangered (IUCN 3.1)

Scientific classification
- Kingdom: Plantae
- Clade: Tracheophytes
- Clade: Angiosperms
- Clade: Eudicots
- Clade: Rosids
- Order: Rosales
- Family: Rosaceae
- Genus: Aria
- Species: A. meierottii

Binomial name
- Aria meierottii (N.Mey.) Mosyakin, Fedor. & McNeill
- It is endemic to Bavaria, Germany

Synonyms
- Karpatiosorbus meierottii (N.Mey.) Sennikov & Kurtto; Pyrus meierottii (N.Mey.) M.F.Fay & Christenh.; Sorbus meierottii N.Mey.

Species of tree

Aria meierottii is an apomictic species of tree in the family Rosaceae endemic to Bavaria, Germany. It is extremely rare and threatened with extinction.

== Description ==
Aria meierottii in the southern Franconian Jura

Aria meierottii foliage

=== Vegetative characteristics ===
Aria meierottii is an up to 8 m tall, calcicolous tree or shrub with elliptic, slightly lobed leaves with broadly cuneate to nearly rounded leaf bases. The 9 cm long, and 6.5 cm wide leaves of the long twigs have 9–10 pairs of lateral veins, which are set 7–9 mm apart.

=== Generative characteristics ===
The flowers have two partially fused styles. The reddish orange, globose, 12–13 mm wide accessory fruit bears numerous grey, 0.5–0.7 mm big lenticels.

=== Cytology ===
The chromosome count is 2n = 4x = 68 or 2n = 5x = 85.

== Taxonomy ==
It was first described as Sorbus meierottii N.Mey. in 2005. It was moved to the genus Aria (Pers.) J.Jacq. ex Host as Aria meierottii (N.Mey.) Mosyakin, Fedor. & McNeill by Sergei Leonidovich Mosyakin, Mykola Mykhaylovych Fedoronchuk, and John McNeill in 2025. The type specimen was collected by H. Schuwerk and O. Angerer on a forest edge at a hill near Wellheim, Germany on the 18 of June 2001.

=== Etymology ===
The specific epithet meierottii honours the German botanist Lenz Meierott.

== Distribution and habitat ==
It is endemic to Wellheim in Bavaria, Germany, where it occurs in a small area of only 17 km^{2} on the margins of deciduous forest and on rocks at elevations of 400–500 m above sea level.

== Conservation ==
It is a critically endangered species with a small population of only 20 saplings and 40 mature trees. It is cultivated in the ex situ conservation collection of the Botanischer Garten der Universität Regensburg.
