= Gießgraben (Schutter) =

River of Bavaria, Germany

Location
- Country: Germany
- States: Bavaria

Physical characteristics
- Mouth
  - location: Schutter
  - coordinates: 48.8126°N 11.1163°E

Basin features
- Progression: Schutter→ Danube→ Black Sea

Gießgraben is a small river of Bavaria, Germany. It is a right tributary of the Schutter near Wellheim.

== See also ==
- List of rivers of Bavaria
