= Schutter (Danube) =

River in Germany

- The Schutter in Nassenfels, near the castle

Location
- Country: Germany
- State: Bavaria

Physical characteristics
- Mouth
  - location: Danube
  - coordinates: 48.7571°N 11.4242°E
- Length: 35.3 km (21.9 mi)
- Basin size: 116 km^{2} (45 sq mi)

Basin features
- Progression: Danube→ Black Sea

Schutter (German pronunciation: [ˈʃʊtɐ]) is a river of Bavaria, Germany. It is a left tributary of the Danube in Ingolstadt.

== See also ==
- List of rivers of Bavaria
