= Egweil =

- Municipality
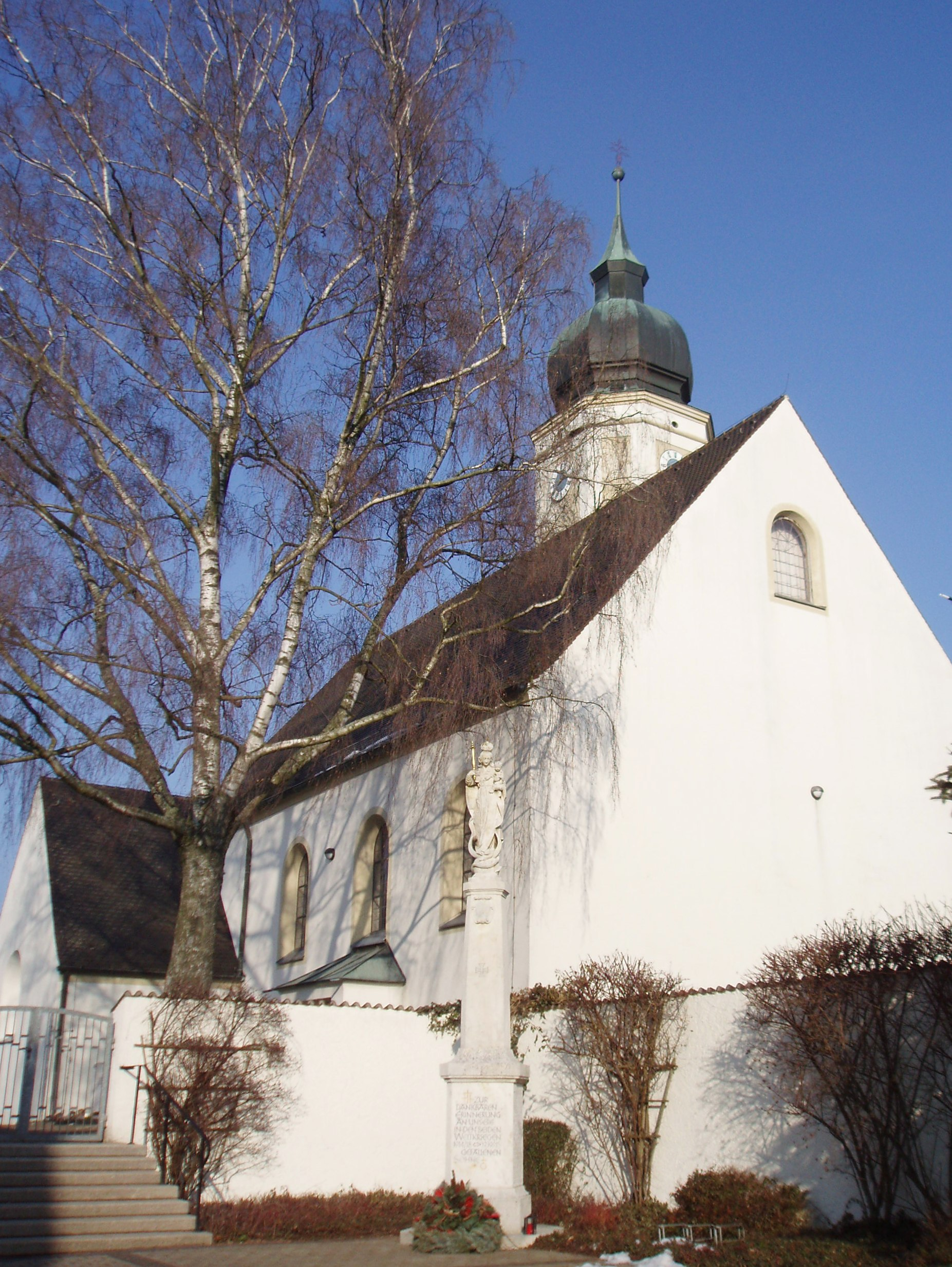
- Church of Saint Martin

- Coat of arms

- Location of Egweil within Eichstätt district
- Interactive map of Egweil
- Location within Germany Location within Bavaria
- Coordinates: 48°47′N 11°14′E
- Country: Germany
- State: Bavaria
- Admin. region: Oberbayern
- District: Eichstätt
- Municipal assoc.: Nassenfels

Government
  - Mayor (2020–26): Johannes Schneider (CSU)

Area
  - Total: 9.39 km^{2} (3.63 sq mi)
- Elevation: 392 m (1,286 ft)

Population (2025-12-31)
  - Total: 1,247
  - Density: 133/km^{2} (344/sq mi)
- Time zone: UTC+01:00 (CET)
  - Summer (DST): UTC+02:00 (CEST)
- Postal codes: 85116
- Dialling codes: 08424
- Vehicle registration: EI
- Website: www.egweil.de

Egweil is a municipality in the district of Eichstätt in Bavaria in Germany.

== Mayor ==
- 2002-2014: Wunibald Koppenhofer
- Since May 2014: Johannes Schneider (CSU)
