= Nassenfels Castle =

Water castle in Bavaria, Germany

- Nassenfels
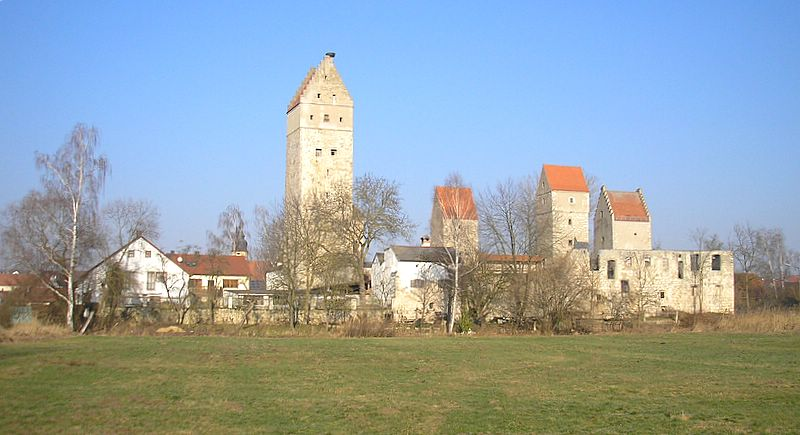
- View from the south

Site information
- Type: lowland castle, water castle
- Code: DE-BY
- Condition: half ruined

Location
- Coordinates: 48°47′45.47″N 11°13′44.41″E
- Height: 384 m above sea level (NHN)

Site history
- Built: first recorded in 1245
- Materials: Brick, limestone ashlars, rubble stone walls

Garrison information
- Occupants: clerics

Nassenfels Castle (German: Burg Nassenfels) stands at the edge of the market village of Nassenfels in the county of Eichstätt in Upper Bavaria. The former water castle is still lived in and may only be viewed from the outside.

== History ==
Nassenfels was already an important market village (known as Vicus Scutarensium) in the hinterland of the Rhaetian Limes in the 2nd century AD and was protected by a small castellum. The Roman camp was probably abandoned after the establishment of nearby Pfünz Roman Fort (Vetoniana). During the Hungarian invasions of the 10th century, the ramparts of the old fortification were probably expanded to form a refuge castle.

From the High Middle Ages the village belonged to the Bishopric of Eichstätt. The castle first appears in the records in 1245 in a deed, when Count Gebhard of Hirschberg was murdered by his court jester during the siege of the fortress. Episcopal vassals with the surname von Nassenfels are, however, recorded from 1198 onwards, but disappear again from literary sources in the mid-14th century.

The present castle goes back mainly to its expansion under Bishops Conrad II of Pfeffenhausen (1297–1305) and Frederick IV of Oettingen (c. 1400). In 1699, the prince-bishop's court architect, Jakob Engel, built the Kastenhaus in the southeastern corner as an office building for the episcopal steward (Kastner). Until 1804, the castle served as the seat of Eichstätt officials (Amtmänner and pfleger. In the wake of secularisation, a revenue office (Rentamt) was created in the rooms for 2 years. In 1806, the Bavarian state sold the complex to private buyers, who built their own houses against the enceinte and demolished several buildings. In 1867, stone taken away to be used to build the stations of Adelschlag and Tauberfeld. In 1932, the Kastenhaus, with its stuccoed ceilings, was razed by a lightning strike. Plans to rebuild it came to nothing. In 1990, part of the chemin de ronde was reconstructed. Since the 1980s, the four Jura houses in the castle grounds have been restored.

Today the interior of the castle is only open to the public on special occasions, because the structures of the late 18th and early 19th centuries are still used as residences and for trade (some holiday apartments and restoration workshop).

== Description ==
The rectangular castle lies on the southern edge of the market village. The former wide moat has been largely filled in or has silted up. The western part of the mediaeval enceinte was pulled down in the 19th century and replaced by domestic buildings. On the other sides, the walls are still up to five metres high and there is a narrow zwinger in front of them. The original chemin de rondes have all disappeared, and the palas and the pfleger's house were demolished in the early 19th century. Since the fire in 1932, only the enclosing wall of the Kastnerhaus is left. The remaining structures in the interior date mostly to the 19th century.

Despite the demolitions and losses, the former water castle is still one of the most important and impressive castle systems in Bavaria. In addition to the partially preserved enceinte, three wall towers and the high bergfried have survived. The four towers are capped by steeply pitched gable roofs. The gable walls are made of brick. The bergfried and East Tower have stepped gables.

The unusually high bergfried was built over an older tower whose lower storeys form part of its walls. The inventories record this tower as an older bergfried. The ground floor of this old structure was converted into a castle chapel with a chancel arch and used to have a - largely hewn out - cross vault ceiling. In the south, there is a doorway in the walls. A small nave must have existed adjacent to the chancel arch. Apparently a small Romanesque chancel tower church was converted in 1300 into a massive bergfried. Later, a new chapel was built to replace it. This later chapel was secularised in 1808 and eventually demolished. The site of this second castle chapel is not precisely known.

The bergfried is about 37 metres high to the roof ridge. Its circular arched elevated entrance is on the east side on the second floor. In front of it is a wall structure that used to carry the passageway from the demolished pfleger house to the entranceway. The tower is made of regular limestone ashlars, most of the rest of the castle is made of irregular rubble stone walls.

Little research or investigation had been carried out into this large castle site until archaeological excavations took place in 1982. Within the castle area were discovered finds from the period from 70,000 BC to the Celtic era around 2,000 BC. At a depth of around a metre was found an old coral reef, 145 million years old, the so-called Speckberg.

== Gallery ==
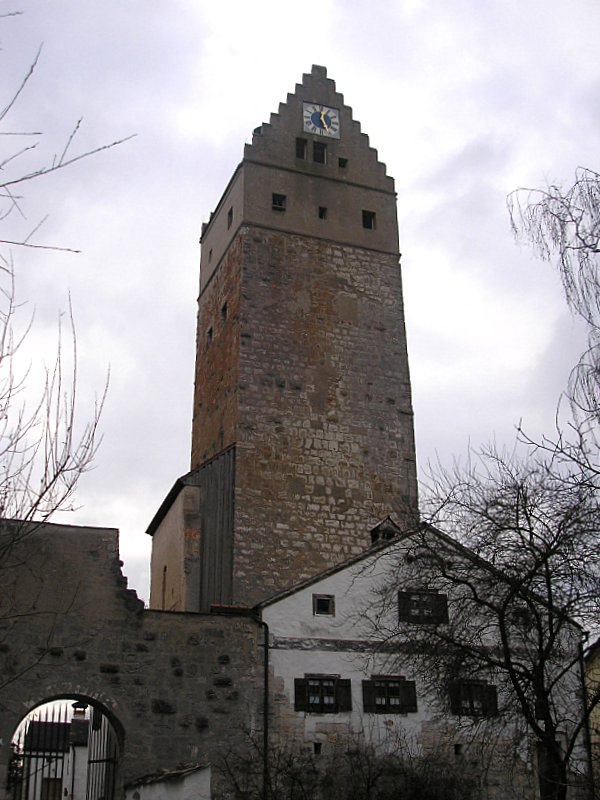
The bergfried from the north

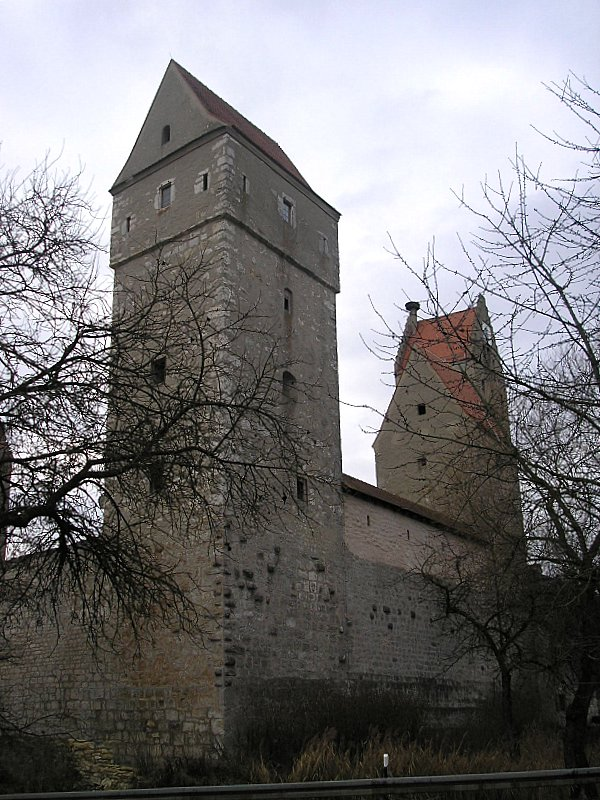
Northeastern corner tower and view of the gateway

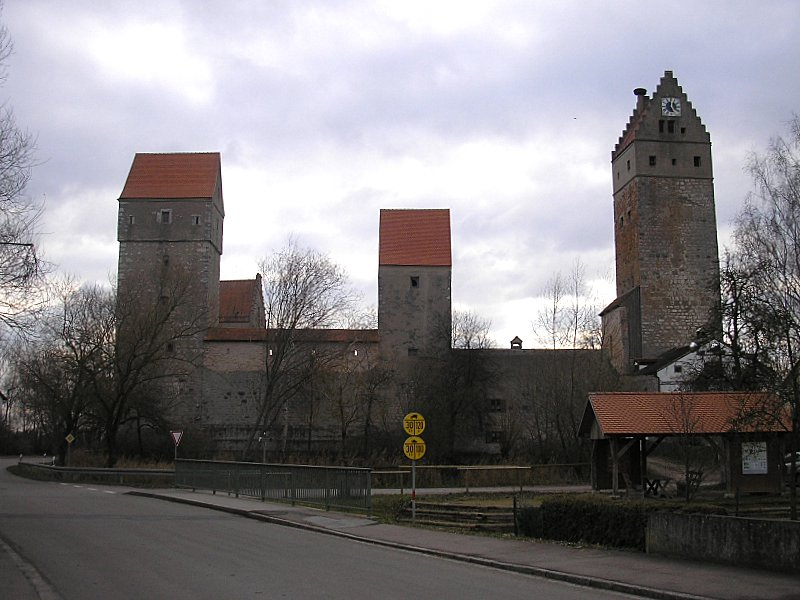
View from the edge of the village to the north

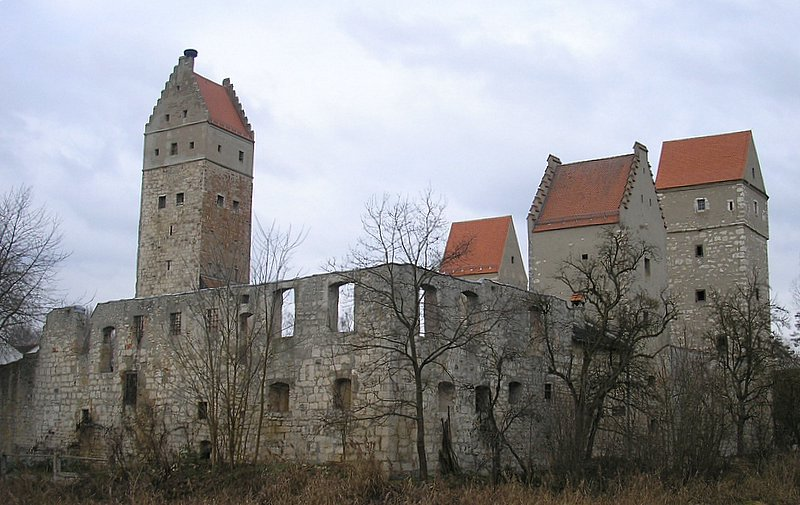
The former water castle from the SE with the ruins of the Kastnerhaus

== Literature ==
- Peter Leuschner: Die Jurahaus-Kuriositäten auf dem Korallenriff. In: Das Jura-Haus 10 (2004/2005), pp. 5–10.
- Meyer, von Werner (1986). Burgen in Oberbayern : ein Handbuch [Castles in Upper Bavaria: a manual] (in German). Würzburg: Weidlich. pp. 94–95. ISBN 3-8035-1279-4.
- Die Kunstdenkmäler von Bayern, V, 2. Bezirksamt Eichstätt. Munich, 1928.
- Karl Zecherle (Red.) (1987), Landkreis Eichstätt (ed.), Burgen und Schlösser: Kreis Eichstätt im Naturpark Altmühltal (in German) (2nd unamended ed.), Kipfenberg: Hercynia-Verlag, pp. 52–53, 944206697
