= Nassenfels (Verwaltungsgemeinschaft) =

- Verwaltungsgemeinschaft
- Location of Nassenfels within Eichstätt district
- Interactive map of Nassenfels
- Location within Germany Location within Bavaria
- Coordinates: 48°48′N 11°14′E
- Country: Germany
- State: Bavaria
- Admin. region: Upper Bavaria
- District: Eichstätt
- Seat: Nassenfels
- Subdivisions: 3 municipalities

Area
  - Total: 79.74 km^{2} (30.79 sq mi)

Population (2025-12-31)
  - Total: 6,579
  - Density: 82.51/km^{2} (213.7/sq mi)
- Time zone: UTC+01:00 (CET)
  - Summer (DST): UTC+02:00 (CEST)
- Website: www.vg-nassenfels.de

Nassenfels is a Verwaltungsgemeinschaft (municipal association) in the district of Eichstätt in Bavaria, Germany. Its seat is in Nassenfels.

It consists of the following municipalities:

1. Adelschlag
2. Egweil
3. Nassenfels
