= Hohenwarth-Mühlbach am Manhartsberg =

- Municipality
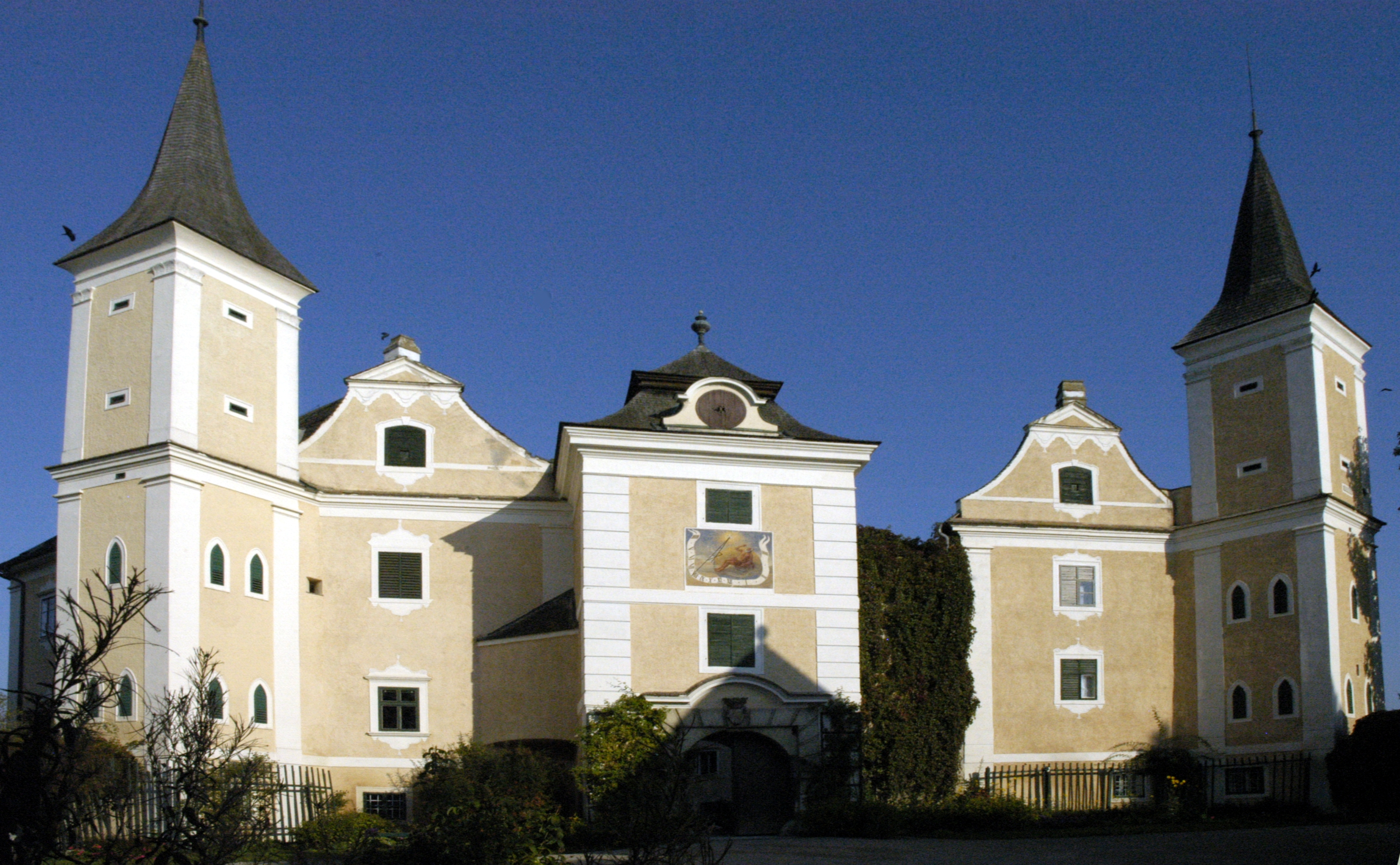
- Mühlbach Castle

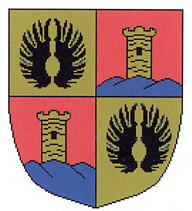
- Coat of arms

- Location within Austria
- Coordinates: 48°30′N 15°49′E
- Country: Austria
- State: Lower Austria
- District: Hollabrunn

Government
  - Mayor: Alfred Zeilinger

Area
  - Total: 43.59 km^{2} (16.83 sq mi)
- Elevation: 365 m (1,198 ft)

Population (2018-01-01)
  - Total: 1,304
  - Density: 29.92/km^{2} (77.48/sq mi)
- Time zone: UTC+1 (CET)
  - Summer (DST): UTC+2 (CEST)
- Postal code: 3472
- Area code: 02957
- Website: www.hohenwarth-muehlbach.at

Hohenwarth-Mühlbach am Manhartsberg is a municipality in the district of Hollabrunn in Lower Austria, Austria.

== Geography ==
Hohenwarth-Mühlbach lies in the Weinviertel in Lower Austria. About 29.87 percent of the municipality is forested. The Gießgraben has its source near Hohenwarth.
