= Flanking tower =

Architectural fortification element

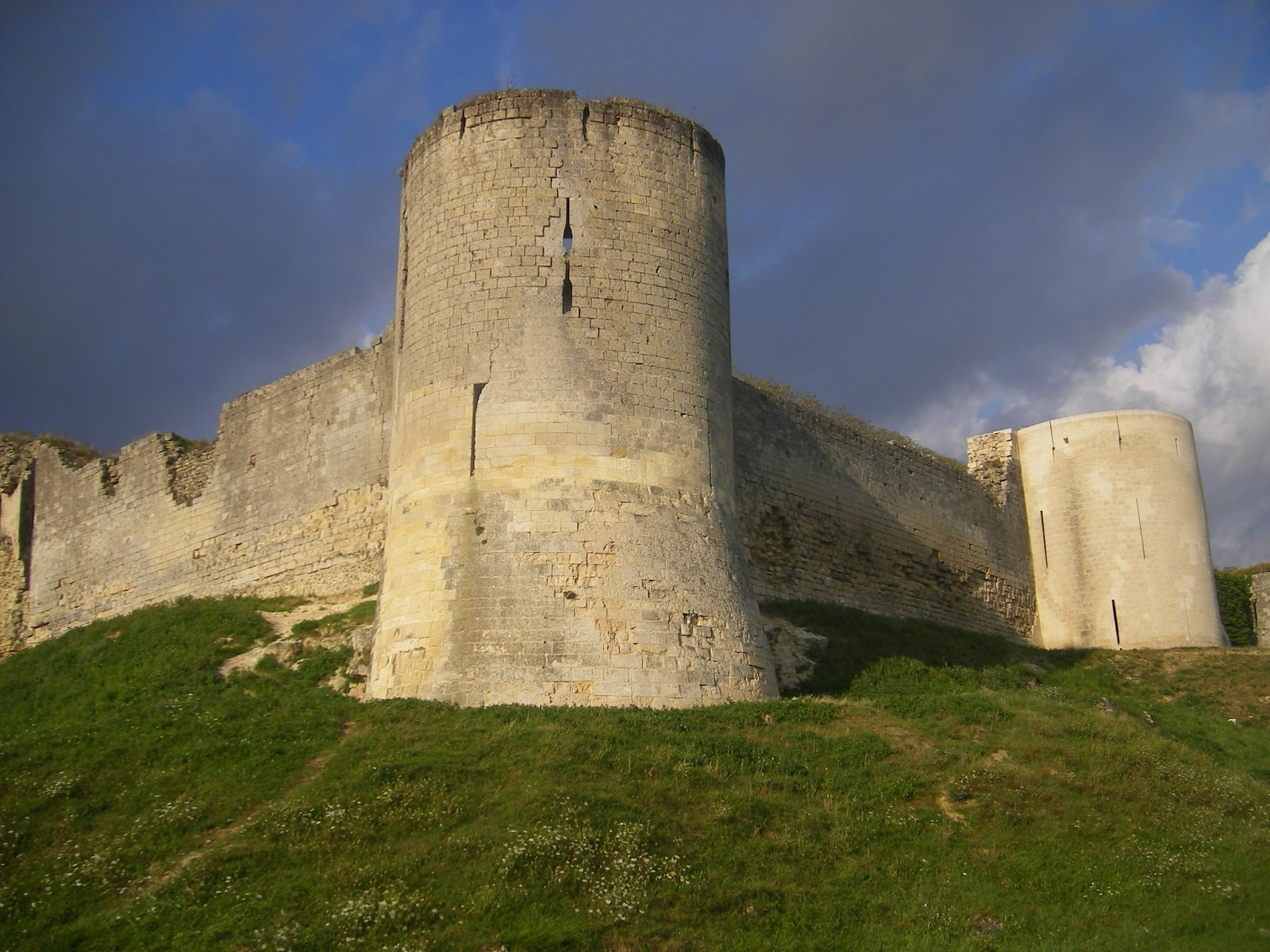
Flanking towers of Château de Coucy

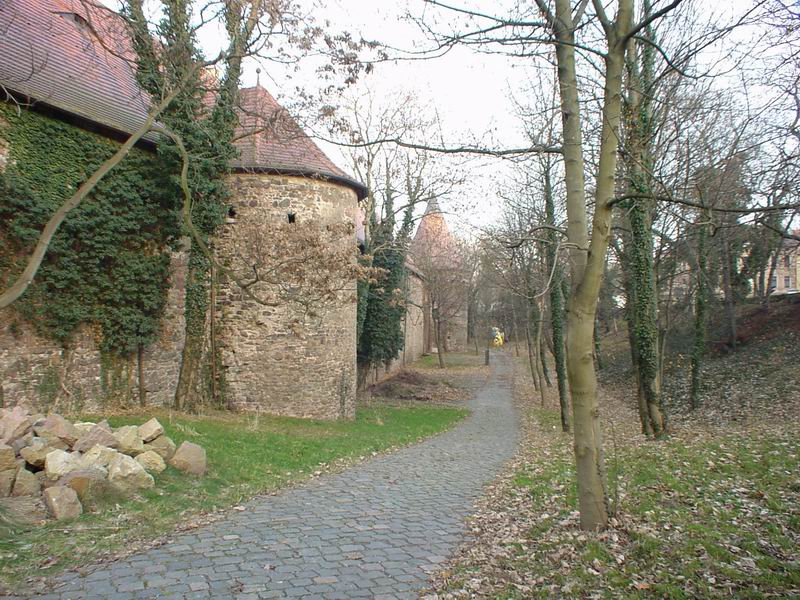
Flanking towers of Giebichenstein Castle

A flanking tower is a fortified tower that is sited on the outside of a defensive wall or other fortified structure and thus forms a flank. From the defensive platform and embrasures the section of wall between them (the curtain wall) could be swept from the side by ranged weapons. In High and Late Medieval castles and town walls, flanking towers often had a semi-circular floor plan or a combination of a rectangular inner and semi-circular outer plans. There were also circular and rectangular towers. Corner flanking towers are found, for example, in the fortifications of the Alhambra and at the manor house of Hugenpoet Palace; Wellheim Castle has a square flanking tower. Semi-circular flanking towers were common in Sasanian architecture.

In church architecture, a flanking tower is a semi-circular or polygonal (for example, octagonal) tower on the outer wall of the church. The church of Great St. Martin Church in Cologne has several flanking towers.
