= Maria of Bosnia =

Maria Kotromanić
- Duchess of Bosnia, Countess of Helfenstein
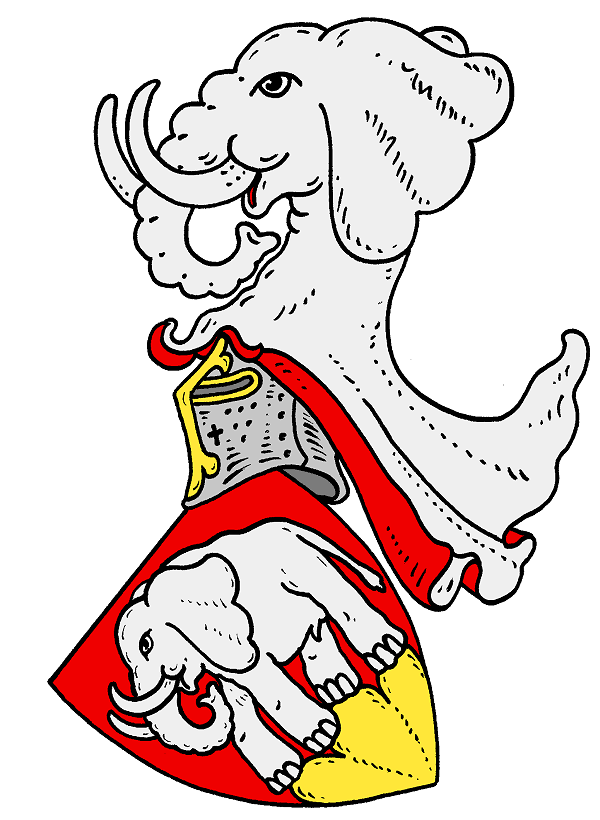

Duchess of Bosnia

Countess of Helfenstein
- Reign: c. 1353 – April 1403
- Died: 27 April 1403
- Spouse: Ulrich V, Count of Helfenstein
- Issue: 6 children
- House: House of Kotromanić
- Father: Stephen II of Bosnia
- Mother: Elizabeth of Kuyavia

Maria of Bosnia (German: Maria von Bosnien; Serbo-Croatian: Марија / Marija; d. 27 April 1403) was a member of the House of Kotromanić who married into the House of Helfenstein.

== Parentage ==
Maria's parentage and connection to the House of Kotromanić is uncertain. King Louis I of Hungary, husband of Ban Stephen II of Bosnia's daughter Elizabeth, apparently mentions her in a charter as Stephen's II sister. Some historiographers have interpreted this literally, considering her a daughter of Ban Stephen I of Bosnia and Elizabeth of Serbia born in 1315. This, however, is very unlikely: it would mean that she married a (never-married and childless) nobleman in her forties, had her youngest children in her fifties, and lived to be over 90 years old. The 16th-century historian Oswald Gabelkover names her a younger daughter of Ban Stephen II. This view is supported by King Louis and Queen Elizabeth's choice of names for their elder daughters, Catherine and Maria, purportedly named after the Queen's supposed sisters, Catherine and Maria. That would make Maria a daughter of Stephen's last wife, Elizabeth of Kuyavia, and place her year of birth shortly after 1335. Two other theories attribute Maria's parentage to Stephen's brother Vladislaus and Jelena Šubić or to another younger brother Ninoslaus.

== Countess of Helfenstein ==
Maria's marriage to Ulrich V, Count of Helfenstein, was most likely arranged by his overlord, Holy Roman Emperor Charles IV. Maria probably resided for some time at the Hungarian court along with Elizabeth of Bosnia, then fiancée and later wife of the King. On 26 April 1352, the Hungarian noblemen escorted Maria to Passau in the Holy Roman Empire. By the time King Louis mentioned her again, in a charter dated 25 March 1353, Maria was already a married woman. The marriage brought considerable prestige to Ulrich. Maria too was aware of her higher status and, in addition to the title Countess of Helfenstein, often referred to herself as Duchess of Bosnia. From 1365 until 1399, she signed her donations as "Maria Herzogin von Bosnien". As a compensation for marrying below her status, Maria enjoyed influence and autonomy highly unusual for a married woman. Early in their marriage, Maria pushed her husband to divide the county he had jointly ruled with his cousin and namesake, Ulrich the Younger. The couple were noted benefactors and also enjoyed imperial favour. They had six sons – Frederick (born in 1357), Louis, William, Conrad, Ulrich and John, and three daughters – Agnes, Beatrix and Maria.

Ulrich died in 1372 and was succeeded by his and Maria's sons, Conrad and Frederick. Three of their sons had chosen ecclesiastical careers, with Louis becoming Archbishop of Kalocsa in 1382, probably thanks to Maria's connection to the Hungarian royal family. Maria's widowhood was burdened with financial difficulties, which forced her and her sons to sell a large part of the Helfenstein patrimony, including Maria's dower lands. She spent the rest of her life in Bühringen Castle, which she had received as dower, in Bad Überkingen. She died on 27 April 1403 and was likely buried in Überkingen. The epitaph on her tombstone was illegible already by the mid-16th century.

== Legacy ==
Maria has traditionally been blamed for the financial downfall of the House of Helfenstein. Gabelkover attributes the family's misfortune following Maria and Ulrich's marriage to the disparity between their ranks, i.e. to Ulrich's marrying up the social ladder. She was accused of wastefulness and of raising her daughters in such manner.

Nevertheless, Maria left a significant mark on the city, financing, among other things, the construction of a hospital in Geislingen an der Steige in Baden-Württemberg, Germany. The medieval hospital still bears an inscription dedicated to Maria, from which it can be concluded that she was responsible for its establishment. Also, a street in Geislingen bears the name Maria-von-Bosnien-Weg.
There is also a musical titled Maria von Bosnien – eine Hochzeit und ein Todesfall ("Maria of Bosnia – a Wedding and a Funeral").

In her native country, Bosnia and Herzegovina, little is known of this medieval noblewoman.
