= Helfenstein Castle =

Coordinates: 48°36′58″N 9°50′49″E

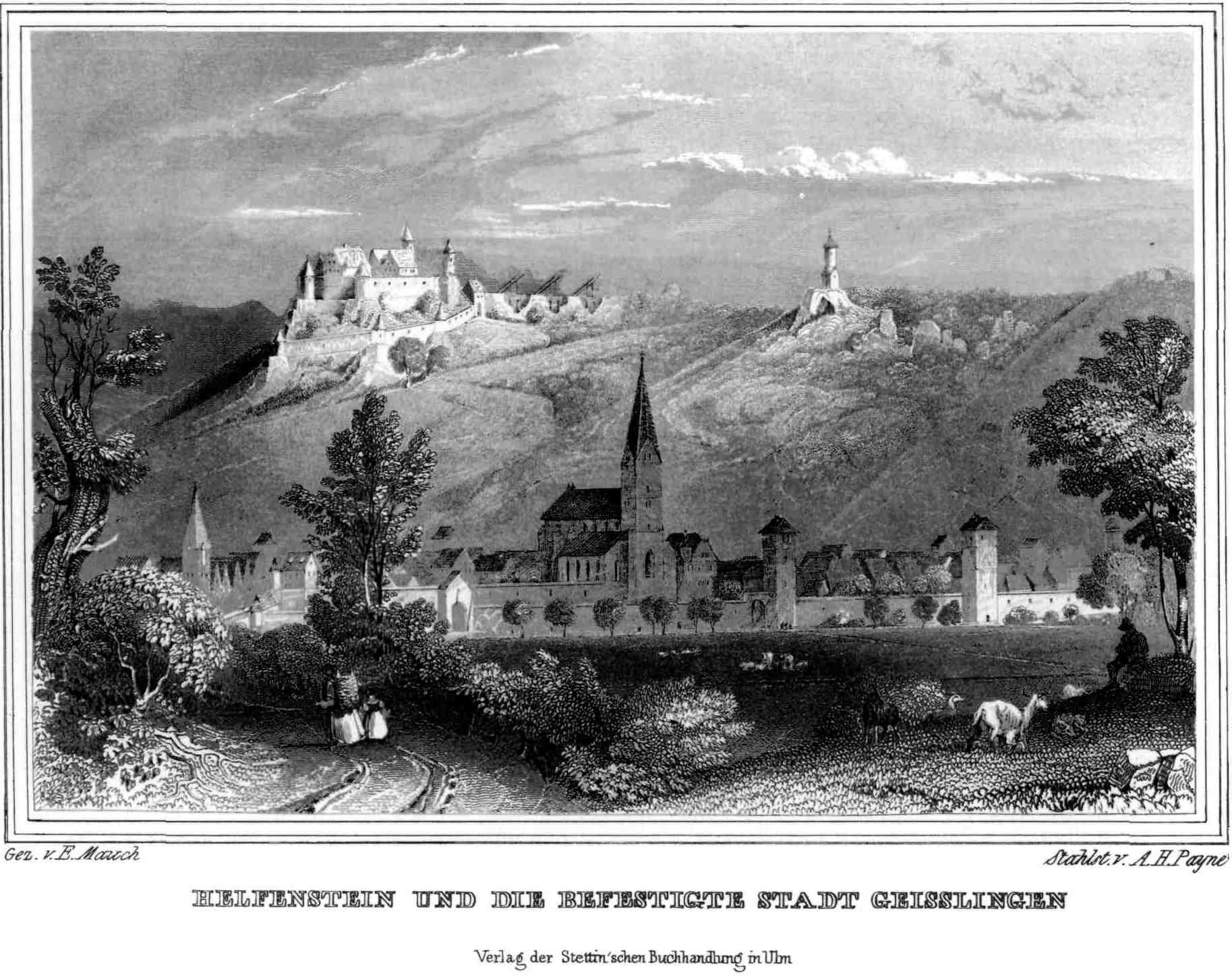
Engraving of Helfenstein Castle with the town of Geislingen an der Steige below its ruins.

Helfenstein Castle represents the remnants of the fortified castle (burg) Helfenstein of the counts of Helfenstein located above the city of Geislingen an der Steige, Baden-Württemberg, Germany. It was destroyed in 1552.

== See also ==
- List of castles in Baden-Württemberg
- House of Helfenstein
