= Hexenagger Castle =

Coordinates: 48°55′17″N 11°40′56″E

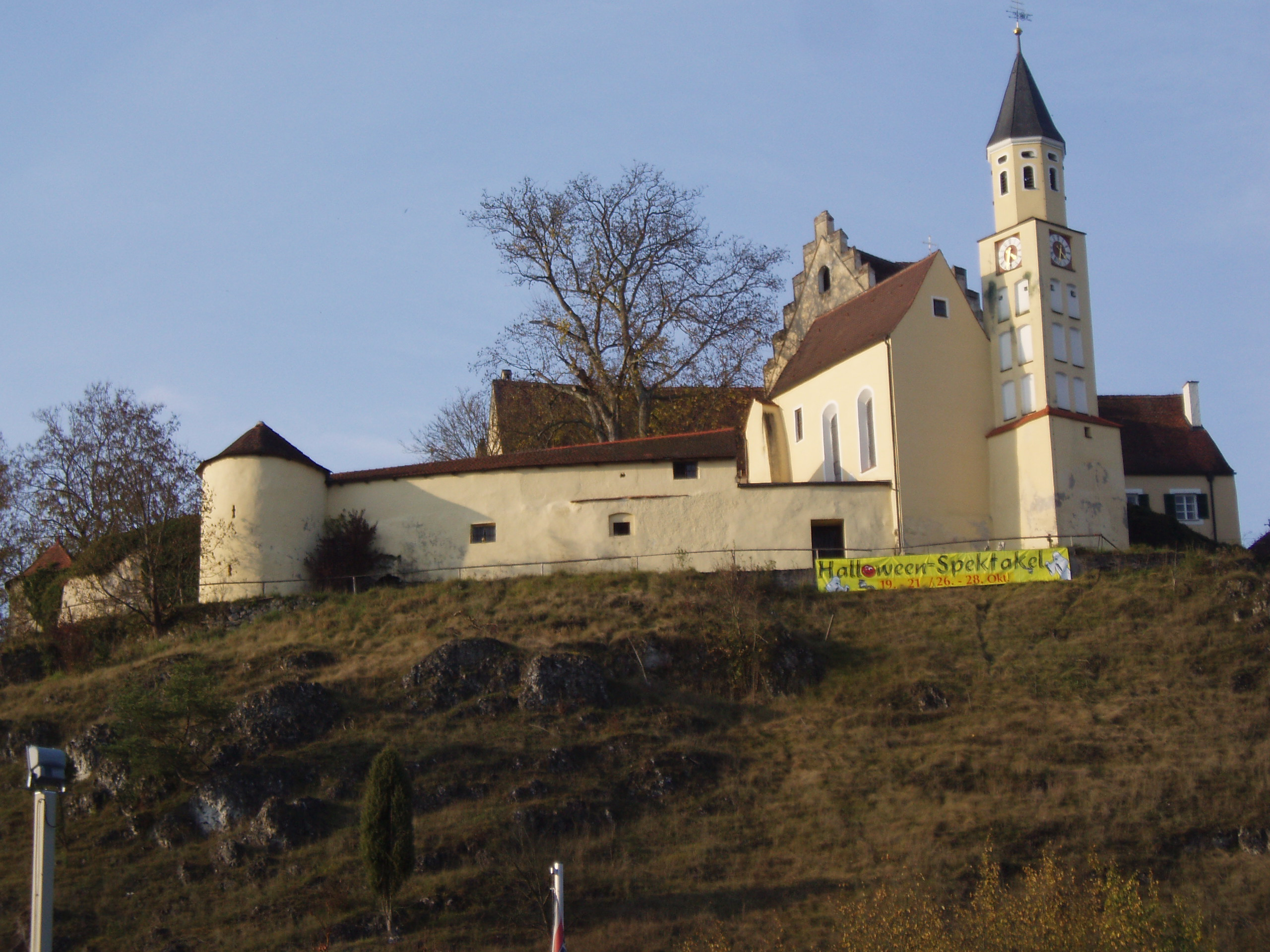
Schloss Hexenagger.

Schloss Hexenagger is a Bavarian castle located in the district of Hexenagger located near the town of Altmannstein in the Altmühl Valley Nature Park (Naturpark Altmühltal). The castle probably was first built in the tenth century, as it is first mentioned in a record from the Monastery of St. Emmeram of Regensburg in 982. Originally, the Bavarian noble family of Muggenthaler resided in the castle. The castle was destroyed during the Thirty Years' War and rebuilt in the Baroque style. Since the extinction of the Hexenagger Muggerthaler family line, the castle has passed through several owners. One of the most notable owners was Elector Karl Albrecht, later Holy Roman Emperor Charles VII, who purchased the castle in 1724 as a gift for his mistress, Countess Maria Josepha von Morawitzky.

Today, the castle is privately owned by Eberhard Leichtfuß and his family. Mr. Leichtfuß is the sixth generation of the noble family von Weidenbach to inherit and live in the castle. The family supports the restoration of the castle by hosting events including summer medieval festivals, weddings, company events, and Christmas markets.

== See also ==
- List of castles
- List of castles in Germany
