= Wellheim =

- Municipality
- Coat of arms

- Location of Wellheim within Eichstätt district
- Interactive map of Wellheim
- Location within Germany Location within Bavaria
- Coordinates: 48°48′N 11°6′E
- Country: Germany
- State: Bavaria
- Admin. region: Upper Bavaria
- District: Eichstätt
- Subdivisions: 6 Ortsteile

Government
  - Mayor (2020–26): Robert Husterer (CSU)

Area
  - Total: 33.81 km^{2} (13.05 sq mi)
- Elevation: 400 m (1,300 ft)

Population (2025-12-31)
  - Total: 2,725
  - Density: 80.60/km^{2} (208.7/sq mi)
- Time zone: UTC+01:00 (CET)
  - Summer (DST): UTC+02:00 (CEST)
- Postal codes: 91809
- Dialling codes: 08427
- Vehicle registration: EI
- Website: www.wellheim.de

Wellheim (German pronunciation: [ˈvɛlhaɪm]) is a municipality in the district of Eichstätt in Bavaria in Germany. It lies in the so-called "Urdonautal", the valley the Danube used some 300,000 years ago on its way to the Black Sea. Today a little river, the Schutter flows through the village in the opposite direction (north-south vs. south-north). The municipality consists of 5 villages (Aicha, Hard, Gammersfeld, Biesenhard, Konstein and Wellheim) and has about 2800 inhabitants. Today there is no industry at all but a wonderful landscape with a pure nature.

== See also ==
- Wellheim Castle
