= Margarethe von Helfenstein =

Margarethe von Helfenstein (1480–1537) was the illegitimate daughter of Maximilian I, Holy Roman Emperor.

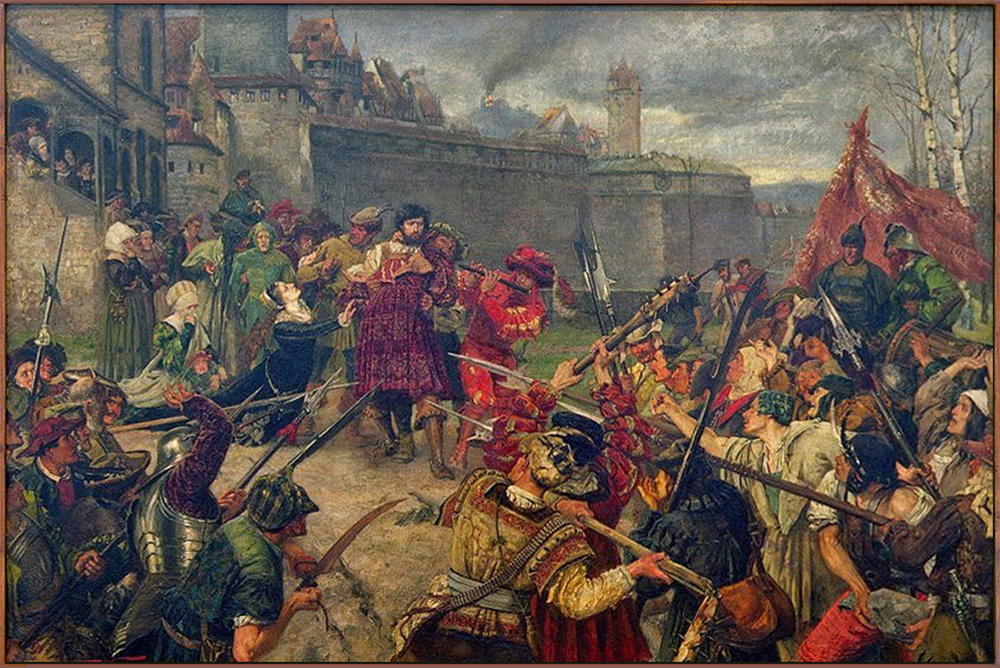
Weinsberger Bluttat (The Weinsberg Massacre), historical painting by Fritz Neuhaus, 1879: The kneeling Margarethe von Helfenstein begs in vain for her husband to be spared.

She married the German Count Ludwig V. von Helfenstein-Wiesensteig. They were taken hostage after the Siege of Weinsberg in 1525 during the Peasants' Revolt. The baker Jacklein Rohrbach pinned her to the ground, telling his companions, "Behold, brethren. Jacklein Rohrbach kneels on the emperor's daughter". The count offered Rohrbach his fortune of 60,000 florins, but the attackers decided to kill him anyway. She was liberated by the army of the Princes, and took refuge at the court of Margaret of Austria, Duchess of Savoy, the regent of the Netherlands. She was given an allowance by Margaret and the emperor. She died around 1525.
