= Nassenfels =

- Municipality
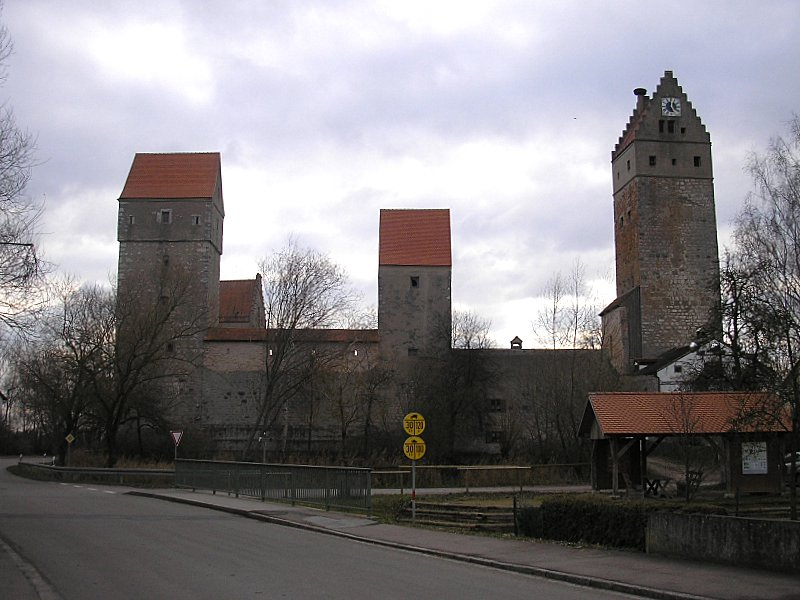
- Nassenfels Castle

- Coat of arms

- Location of Nassenfels within Eichstätt district
- Interactive map of Nassenfels
- Location within Germany Location within Bavaria
- Coordinates: 48°48′N 11°14′E
- Country: Germany
- State: Bavaria
- Admin. region: Oberbayern
- District: Eichstätt
- Municipal assoc.: Nassenfels
- Subdivisions: 3 Ortsteile

Government
  - Mayor (2020–26): Thomas Hollinger

Area
  - Total: 18.46 km^{2} (7.13 sq mi)
- Elevation: 400 m (1,300 ft)

Population (2025-12-31)
  - Total: 2,351
  - Density: 127.4/km^{2} (329.9/sq mi)
- Time zone: UTC+01:00 (CET)
  - Summer (DST): UTC+02:00 (CEST)
- Postal codes: 85128
- Dialling codes: 08424
- Vehicle registration: EI
- Website: www.Nassenfels.de

Nassenfels is a municipality in the district of Eichstätt in Bavaria in Germany.

== Mayors ==
- since 2014: Thomas Hollinger
- 1996-2014: Andreas Husterer
- ? Peter Hecker
