= Wellheim Castle =

Castle in Bavaria, Germany

- Burg Wellheim
- Wellheim
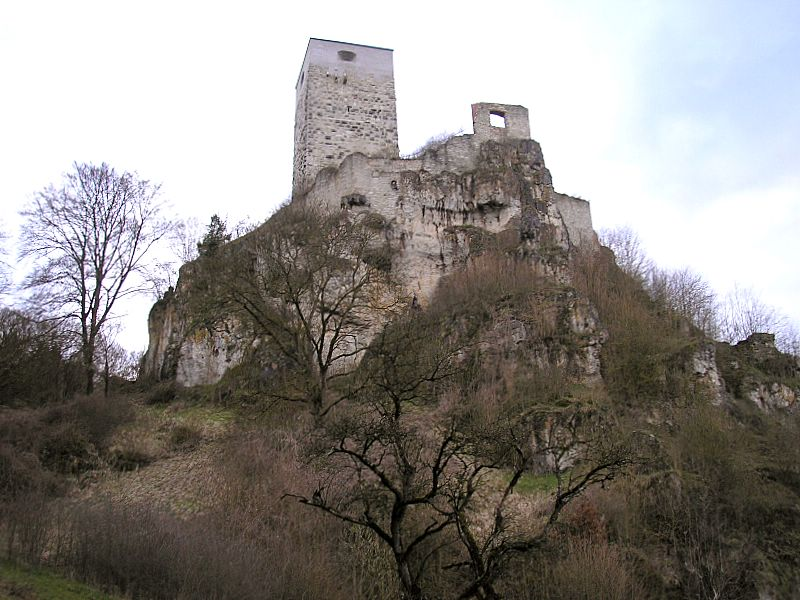
- The castle on the Jurassic rocks

Site information
- Type: hill castle, built on rocks
- Code: DE-BY
- Condition: ruin

Location
- Coordinates: 48°49′13″N 11°04′49″E

Site history
- Built: 12th century
- Materials: rusticated ashlar, limestone, timber-framing

Wellheim Castle (German: Burg Wellheim) is a former fortification in Upper Bavaria (county of Eichstätt). The ruins of the old rock castle stand dominantly on Jurassic rocks above the market town of Wellheim in the ancient Danube valley (the Wellheim dry valley). It was abandoned in the 18th century and partially demolished.

== Description ==
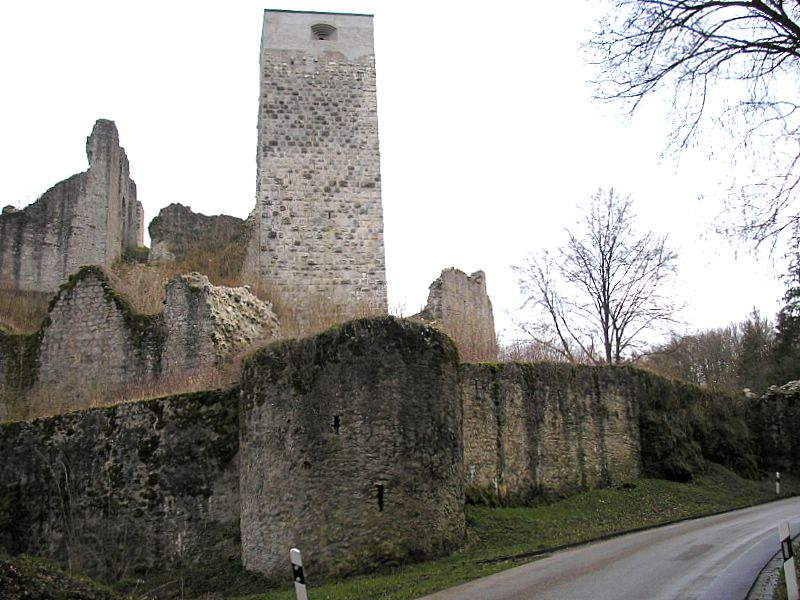
Northwest view of the zwinger, palas and bergfried

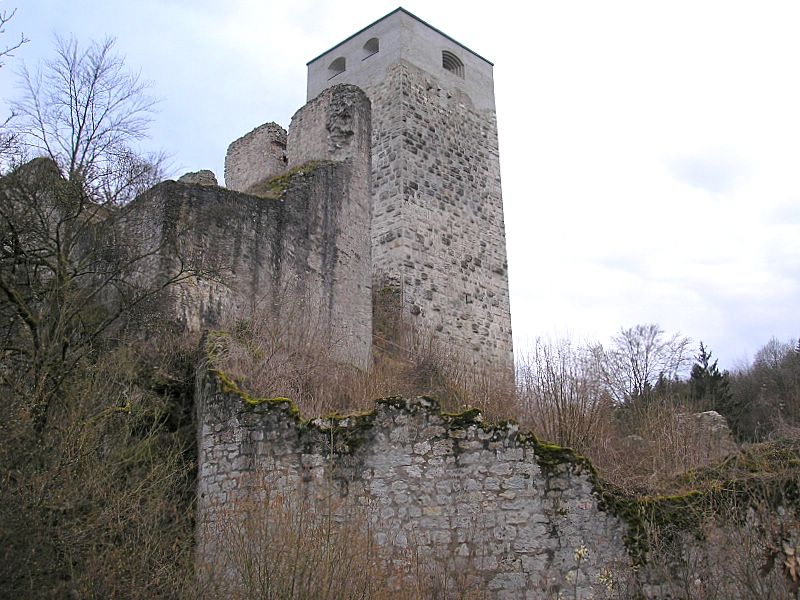
The castle from the northeast

The Romanesque upper bailey was built in a spectacular location on a wild, deeply clefted rock formation above the market town of Wellheim. Of its former palas and the other buildings of the main castle, only parts of the exterior walls and enceinte remain. The palas was sited in the east, a balcony (Söller) linking it to a residential building in the south. In the north rises the mighty, quadratic tower of the bergfried, made of rusticated ashlar blocks with channelled joints. The roughly 35-metre-high tower is topped by a later, brick, upper storey (with round arch window openings) that once had a saddle roof. The original tower was topped by crenellations, that can still be made out from the stonework. The round arched, walled up elevated entrance is on the south side. Today the castle courtyard is filled with rubble to a depth of a metre and overgrown; formerly the entrance was about six metres about the level of the ground. The north wall had to be rebuilt in 1935, because many of the ashlars had been removed since 1836 for use as construction material. The walls are made of double-skinned limestone masonry with mortar and rock filling.

In 1857 an entire storey of the palas had to be demolished as it was in danger of collapse.

The enceinte runs down the slope to ring the middle bailey. Here, too, there was once a smaller, quadrangular building of which only a few remnants have survived.

Below that is the lower bailey. The enceinte here appears to have been repaired several times. Outside a small tower enabled grazing fire to be brought to bear. The wall remains of the two small rooks near the gate were used as livestock sheds. Of the gateway itself only a gap in the wall remains today.

In the 15th century, a zwinger was built in front of the lower ward. Its northern point was guarded by a round tower. The local road to Gammersfeld runs along the northwestern part of the external moat today. The moat is secured on the steep eastern hillside by a retaining wall, which was reinforced on the outer side by a square flanking tower.

== Literature ==
- Friedrich Wilhelm Chrlstiam Gerstäcker (1866). "Ruine Wildenfels: 1. In Wellheim". Die Gartenlaube (in German) (45–53). Wikidata Q19226107.
- Bert Braun: Chronik Marktgemeinde Wellheim, Spardorf, 1981.
- Heinz Mittel: Führer durch das Wellheimer Tal und seine Geschichte, Ingolstadt, 1981.
- Werner Meyer: Burgen in Oberbayern - Ein Handbuch von Werner Meyer. Verlag Weidlich, Würzburg, 1986, ISBN 3-8035-1279-4, pp. 99-102.
- Brun Appel, Rudolf Böhm: Burgen und Schlösser – Kreis Eichstätt im Naturpark Altmühltal. Herausgegeben vom Landkreis Eichstätt, Hercynia Verlag, Kipfenberg, 1981, pp. 50-51.
