= Adelschlag =

- Municipality
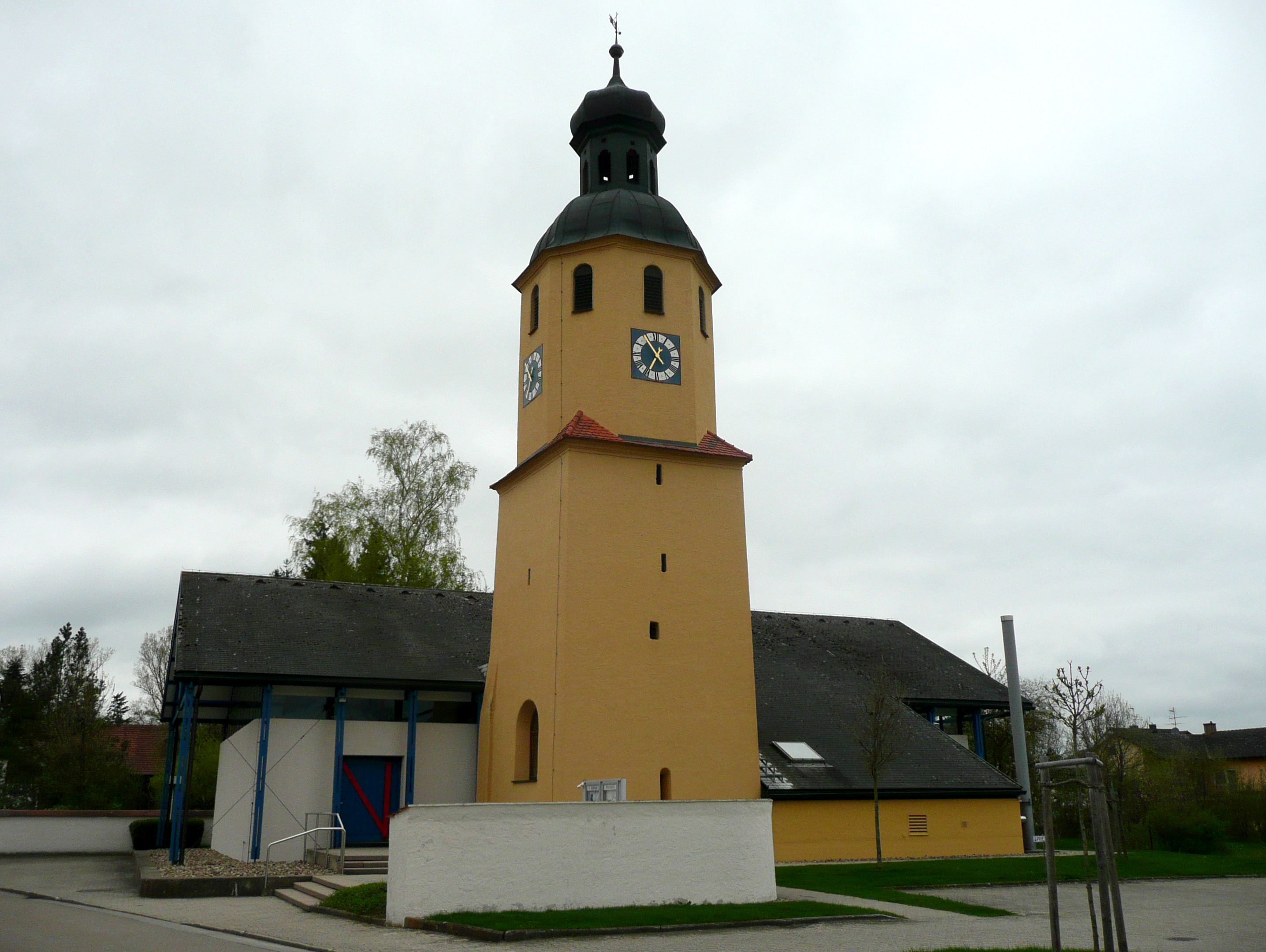
- Church of Saint Andrew

- Coat of arms

- Location of Adelschlag within Eichstätt district
- Interactive map of Adelschlag
- Location within Germany Location within Bavaria
- Coordinates: 48°50′N 11°13′E
- Country: Germany
- State: Bavaria
- Admin. region: Oberbayern
- District: Eichstätt
- Municipal assoc.: Nassenfels
- Subdivisions: 4 Haupt-Ortsteile

Government
  - Mayor (2020–26): Andreas Birzer (CSU)

Area
  - Total: 51.98 km^{2} (20.07 sq mi)
- Elevation: 435 m (1,427 ft)

Population (2025-12-31)
  - Total: 2,981
  - Density: 57.35/km^{2} (148.5/sq mi)
- Time zone: UTC+01:00 (CET)
  - Summer (DST): UTC+02:00 (CEST)
- Postal codes: 85111
- Dialling codes: 08424
- Vehicle registration: EI
- Website: https://www.adelschlag.de/

Adelschlag is a municipality in the district of Eichstätt in Bavaria in Germany.
