= Gießgraben (Zusam) =

River in Germany

Location
- Country: Germany
- States: Bavaria
- District: Dillingen an der Donau

Physical characteristics
- Mouth
  - location: Zusam
  - coordinates: 48°32′22″N 10°39′33″E

Basin features
- Progression: Zusam→ Danube→ Black Sea

Gießgraben is a small left tributary of the Zusam near Wertingen, in the district of Dillingen an der Donau in the state of Bavaria, Germany.

== See also ==
- List of rivers of Bavaria
