= Gießgraben (Danube) =

Location
- Country: Austria
- State: Lower Austria

Physical characteristics
- Source
  - location: below Hohenwarth
  - coordinates: 48.4833°N 15.8667°E
- Mouth
  - location: Danube
  - coordinates: 48.3634°N 15.9358°E
- Length: 20.3 km (12.6 mi)

Basin features
- Progression: Danube→ Black Sea

The Gießgraben (also: Gießbach or Krampugraben) is a river of Lower Austria.

The Gießgraben originates below Hohenwarth and flows in southern direction into an old branch of the Danube near Utzenlaa, Königsbrunn am Wagram. Thereby the river reaches a length of approximately 20 kilometres (12 mi).
