= Falkenstein Castle (Gerstetten) =

Coordinates: 48°36′3″N 10°9′44″E

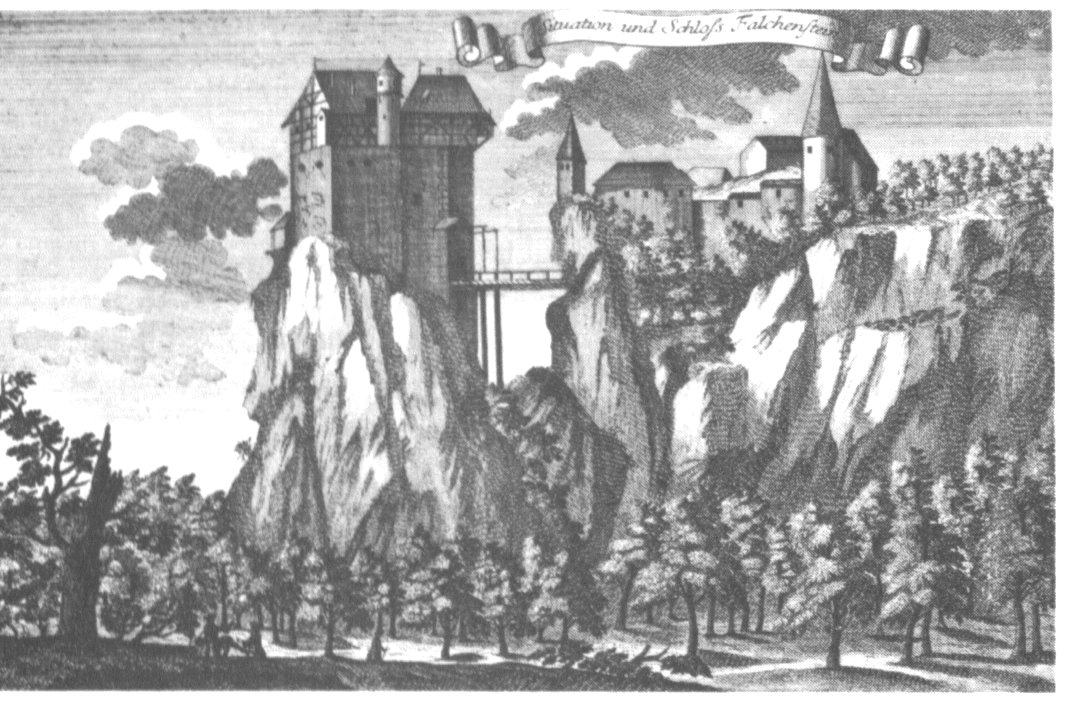
Falkenstein Castle

Falkenstein Castle (German: Burg Falkenstein) is a ruined castle located near Dettingen am Albuch, a borough of Gerstetten, in Heidenheim district of Baden-Württemberg in Germany. The castle is one of at least 16 castles known as Falkenstein in Germany, and is therefore called Falkenstein (Gerstetten) to clarify which castle is meant. The ruins of the castle are open to the public and require a walk of less than an hour to visit.

== History ==
The castle is first mentioned around 1150. Originally built for the von Falkenstein family, it was acquired by the von Faimingen family and the Counts von Helfenstein in the 12th century. The castle was expanded from 1430 until 1450. It was destroyed in 1634, partially demolished in 1740 and further demolished in 1818.

== See also ==
- List of castles in Baden-Württemberg
