= Krumbach, Swabia (district) =

Coordinates: 48.2431°N 10.3633°E

Krumbach (Schwaben)
- District
- Country: Germany
- State: Bavaria
- Adm. region: Swabia
- Disbanded: 1 July 1972
- Capital: Krumbach
- Time zone: UTC+01:00 (CET)
  - Summer (DST): UTC+02:00 (CEST)
- Vehicle registration: KRU

coat of arms

Krumbach was a district in Swabia, Bavaria, Germany, before the regional reorganization in 1972. Krumbach was the capital of this district. The licence plate code was KRU.

The district had 49 municipalities. The largest of them were the towns Krumbach, Bavaria and Thannhausen and the municipalities Ziemetshausen, Neuburg an der Kammel and Ursberg.

It was bounded by (from the north and clockwise) the districts of Günzburg, Augsburg, Schwabmünchen, Mindelheim, Illertissen and Neu-Ulm.

In 1972 the district was merged with Günzburg (district) and the urban district Günzburg to Günzburg district in today's borders.

== Towns and municipalities of the district in the year 1970 ==
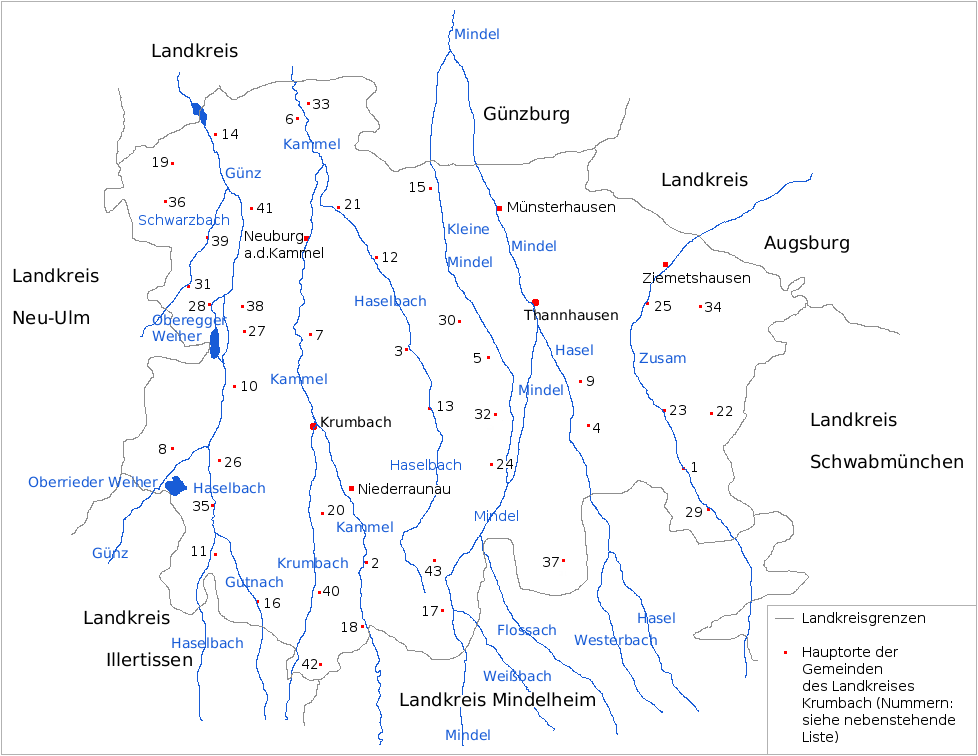
The former district of Krumbach – numbers in the map: see also the opposite list

Towns
Krumbach
Thannhausen

Market Towns
Münsterhausen
Neuburg an der Kammel
Niederraunau, today: part of the town Krumbach
Ziemetshausen

Municipalities
1. Aichen
2. Aletshausen
3. Attenhausen, today: part of the town Krumbach
4. Balzhausen
5. Bayersried-Ursberg, today the name of the municipality is Ursberg
6. Behlingen, today: part of the municipality Kammeltal
7. Billenhausen, today: part of the town Krumbach
8 Breitenthal
9. Burg, today: part of the town Thannhausen
10. Deisenhausen
11. Ebershausen
12. Edelstetten, today: part of the market town Neuburg an der Kammel
13. Edenhausen, today: part of the town Krumbach

14. Ellzee
15. Hagenried, today: part of the market town Münsterhausen
16. Hairenbuch, today: part of the municipality Waltenhausen
17. Hasberg, today: part of the market town Kirchheim in Schwaben, which is part of Unterallgäu district
18. Haupeltshofen, today: part of the municipality Aletshausen
19. Hausen, today: part of the municipality Ellzee
20. Hohenraunau, today: part of the town Krumbach
21. Langenhaslach, today: part of the market town Neuburg an der Kammel
22. Lauterbach, today: part of the market town e Ziemetshausen
23. Memmenhausen, today: part of the municipality Aichen
24. Mindelzell, today: part of the municipality Ursberg
25. Muttershofen, today: part of the market town Ziemetshausen
26. Nattenhausen, today: part of the municipality Breitenthal
27. Oberbleichen, today: part of the municipality Deisenhausen
28. Oberegg, today: part of the municipality Wiesenbach
29. Obergessertshausen, today: part of the municipality Aichen

Unincorporated areas (Gemeindefreie Gebiete)
1. Buch
2. Ebershauser-Nattenhauser Wald]
3. Großer Buchwald
4. Lettenberg
5. Winzer Wald

30. Oberrohr, today: part of the municipality Ursberg
31. Oberwiesenbach, today: part of the municipality Wiesenbach
32. Premach, today: part of the municipality Ursberg
33. Ried, today: part of the municipality Kammeltal
34. Schellenbach (Vorder- and Hinterschellenbach), today: part of the market town Ziemetshausen
35. Seifertshofen, today: part of the municipality Ebershausen
36. Stoffenried, today: part of the municipality Ellzee
37. Tiefenried, today: part of the market town Kirchheim in Schwaben, which is part of Unterallgäu district
38. Unterbleichen, today: part of the municipality Deisenhausen
39. Unterwiesenbach, today: part of the municipality Wiesenbach
40. Waltenhausen
41. Wattenweiler, today: part of the market town Neuburg an der Kammel
42. Weiler, today: part of the municipality Waltenhausen
43. Winzer, today: part of the municipality Aletshausen

== See also ==
- Synagogues of the Swabian type (Hürben, Krumbach)
