= Konzenberg =

Village in Bavaria, Germany

- Village of Haldenwang
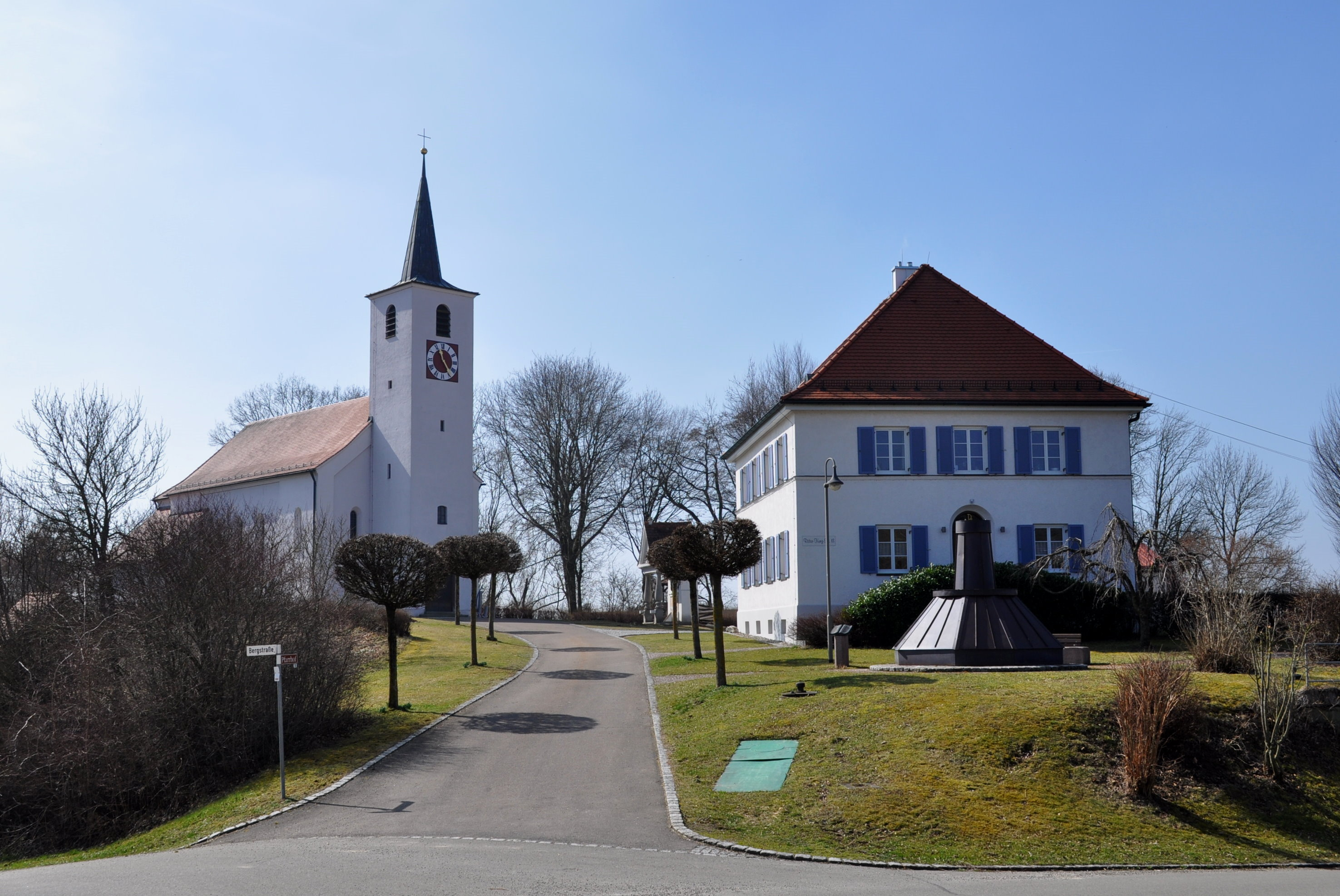
- Church in the village

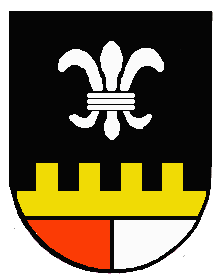
- Coat of arms
- Interactive map of Konzenberg
- Location within Germany Location within Bavaria
- Coordinates: 48°27′N 10°26′E
- Country: Germany
- State: Bavaria
- District: Günzburg
- City: Haldenwang
- Elevation: 498 m (1,634 ft)

Population (2018)
  - Total: 713
- Time zone: UTC+01:00 (CET)
  - Summer (DST): UTC+02:00 (CEST)
- Postal codes: 89356
- Vehicle registration: GZ

Konzenberg is a village in the municipality of Haldenwang, located in the state of Bavaria, Germany. It lies on the eastern side of the Mindel river valley, roughly 498 metres (1,634 ft) above sea level (NHN). The village has a population of 713 as of 2018.
