= Krumbach, Bavaria =

Krumbach
- Municipality
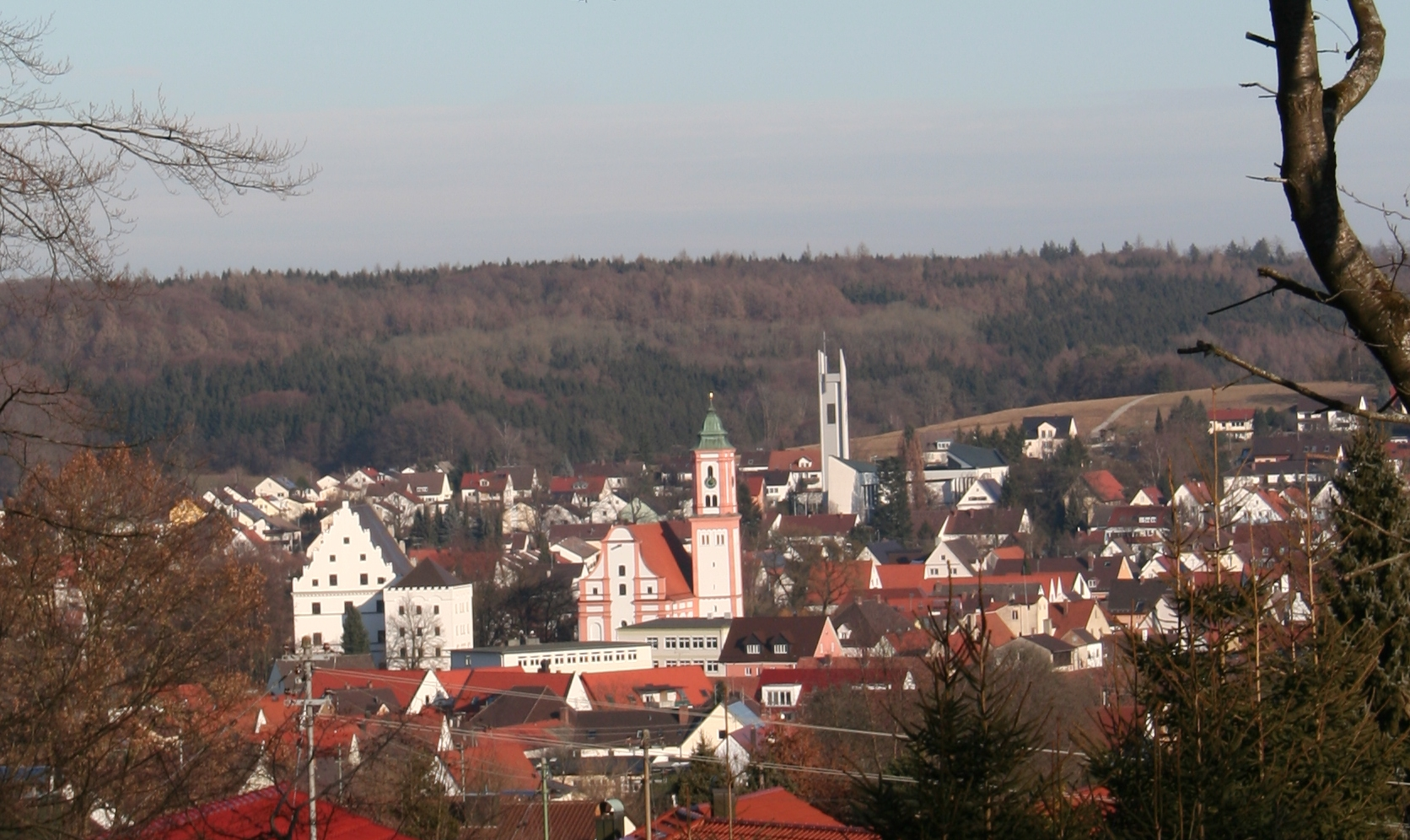
- View of Krumbach from the west

- Coat of arms

- Location of Krumbach within Günzburg district
- Interactive map of Krumbach
- Location within Germany Location within Bavaria
- Coordinates: 48°15′N 10°22′E
- Country: Germany
- State: Bavaria
- Admin. region: Schwaben
- District: Günzburg

Government
  - Mayor (2026–32): Florian Kaida (CSU)

Area
  - Total: 44.64 km^{2} (17.24 sq mi)
- Elevation: 512 m (1,680 ft)

Population (2025-12-31)
  - Total: 14,258
  - Density: 319.4/km^{2} (827.2/sq mi)
- Time zone: UTC+01:00 (CET)
  - Summer (DST): UTC+02:00 (CEST)
- Postal codes: 86381
- Dialling codes: 08282
- Vehicle registration: GZ, KRU
- Website: www.krumbach.de

Krumbach (German pronunciation: [ˈkʁʊmbax]; officially Krumbach (Schwaben)) is a town with 13,000 residents in the district Günzburg in Swabia, Bavaria, Germany. It is the second biggest town in the district.

== Geography ==
Krumbach (elevation 512 m (1680 ft)) is situated in Mittelschwaben in the natural region Lower Iller-Lech Gravel Plateau (a part of the region between Danube and the Alps) in the valley of the Kammel, a left tributary of the Mindel river and so an indirect tributary of the Danube river. The landscape is marked by forests and areas in agricultural acreage (fields and grassland).

The next bigger cities respectively towns are Ulm, approximately 40 kilometres northwest of Krumbach, Augsburg, 48 kilometres northeast of Krumbach, Memmingen, about 40 kilometres southwest of Krumbach, Mindelheim, 30 kilometres south of Krumbach and Günzburg, 27 kilometres north of Krumbach. The distance to Munich is approximately 120 kilometres.

== History ==
In 1156 Krumbach was mentioned in documents the first time, in 1370 the village got the right to hold a market. From 1305 until 1805 Krumbach was part of the Margraviate of Burgau, which was part of the Habsburg Further Austria. In the year 1805 Krumbach became Bavarian by the Peace of Pressburg. 90 years later Krumbach became a town. In the year 1902 the previously independent municipality Hürben, a neighbouring village of Krumbach, merged into Krumbach. Until the time of the Third Reich Hürben had a high percentage of Jewish residents in comparison to the Bavarian average.

Until 1972 Krumbach was the district seat of the administrative district Krumbach (Swabia).

Bavarian regional reforms merged the previously independent municipalities of Hohenraunau (1972/01/01), Billenhausen with Hirschfelden (1972/07/01), Edenhausen with the Krumbad (1973/01/01), Attenhausen (1977/01/01) and Niederraunau (1978/05/01) into Krumbach.

The Krumbad is a health resort approximately one kilometre east of Krumbach. It is the oldest health resort of Swabia.

== Coat of arms ==
The colours of the town (red and white) as well as the arms (a silver-coloured wavy thick line in red) remind one on the one hand of the long affiliation to Further Austria on the other hand it is a canting arms – the crooked stream. In this context, it is important to know, that the meander of the Kammel are clearly distinct.

== Attractions ==
- market place and historic town hall
- church St Michael
- church St Ulrich in Hürben
- church Maria Hilf
- church Lindlkirche
- Mühlkapelle
- castle of Krumbach
- moated castle of Hürben
- Landauer Haus
- Middleswabian lokal heritage museum
- waxart museum MORSA
- Krumbad
- church of Niederraunau
- castle of Niederraunau
- Dossenberger Pfarrhof (parsonage) Billenhausen
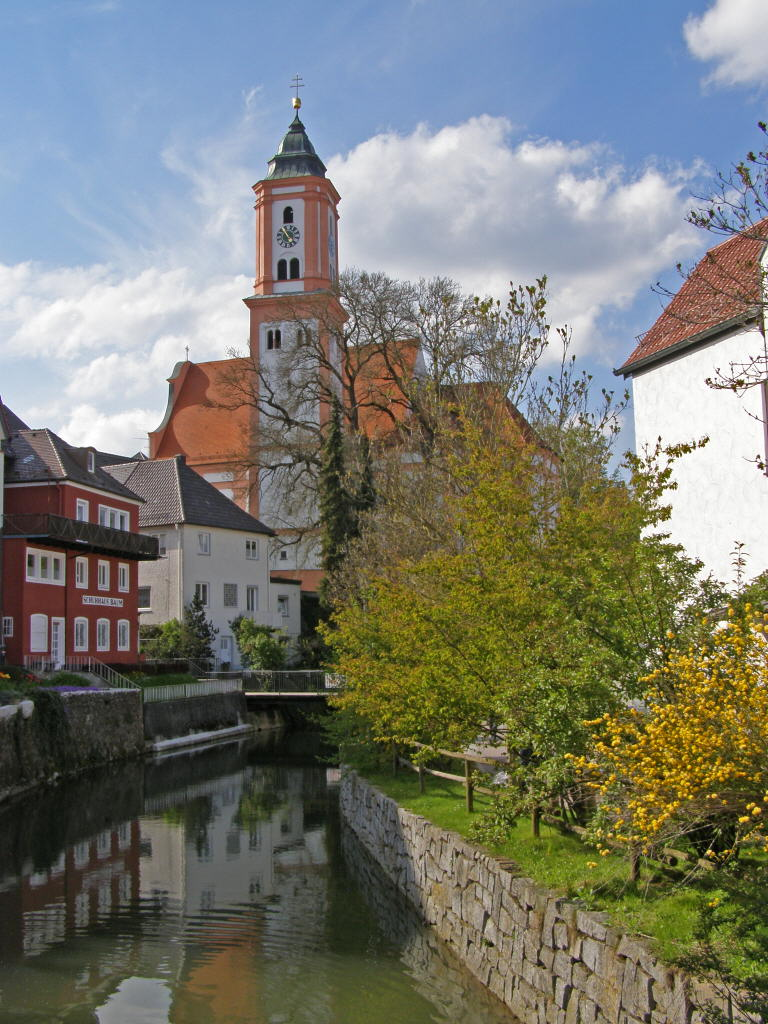
Church St Michael

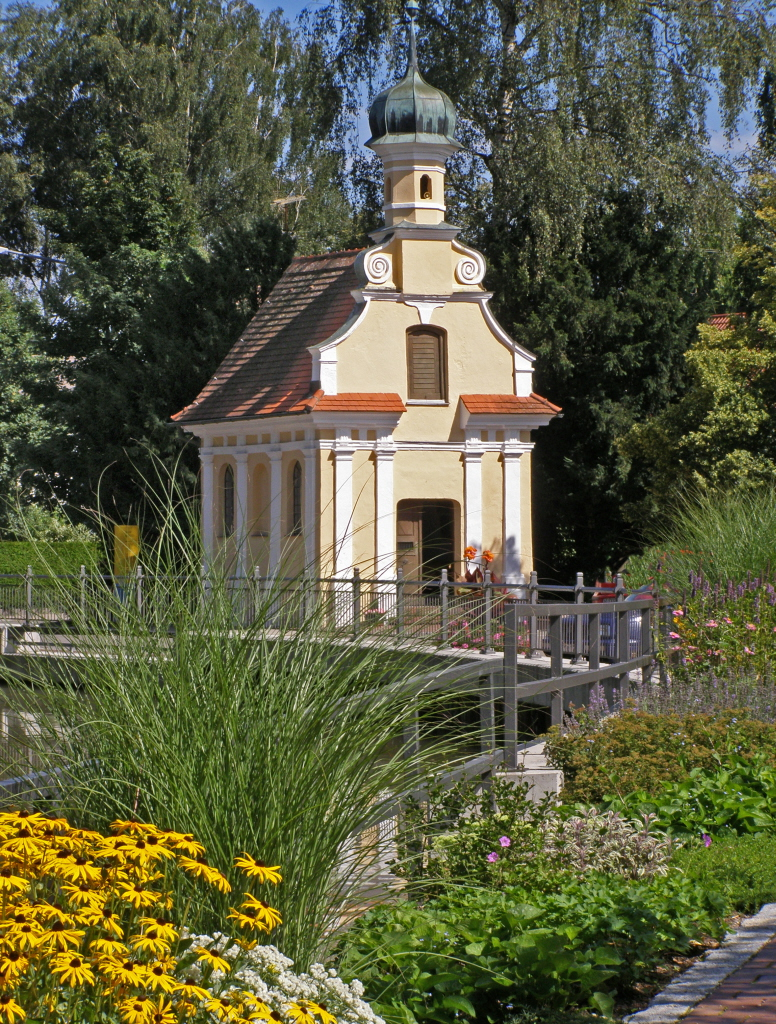
Mühlkapelle

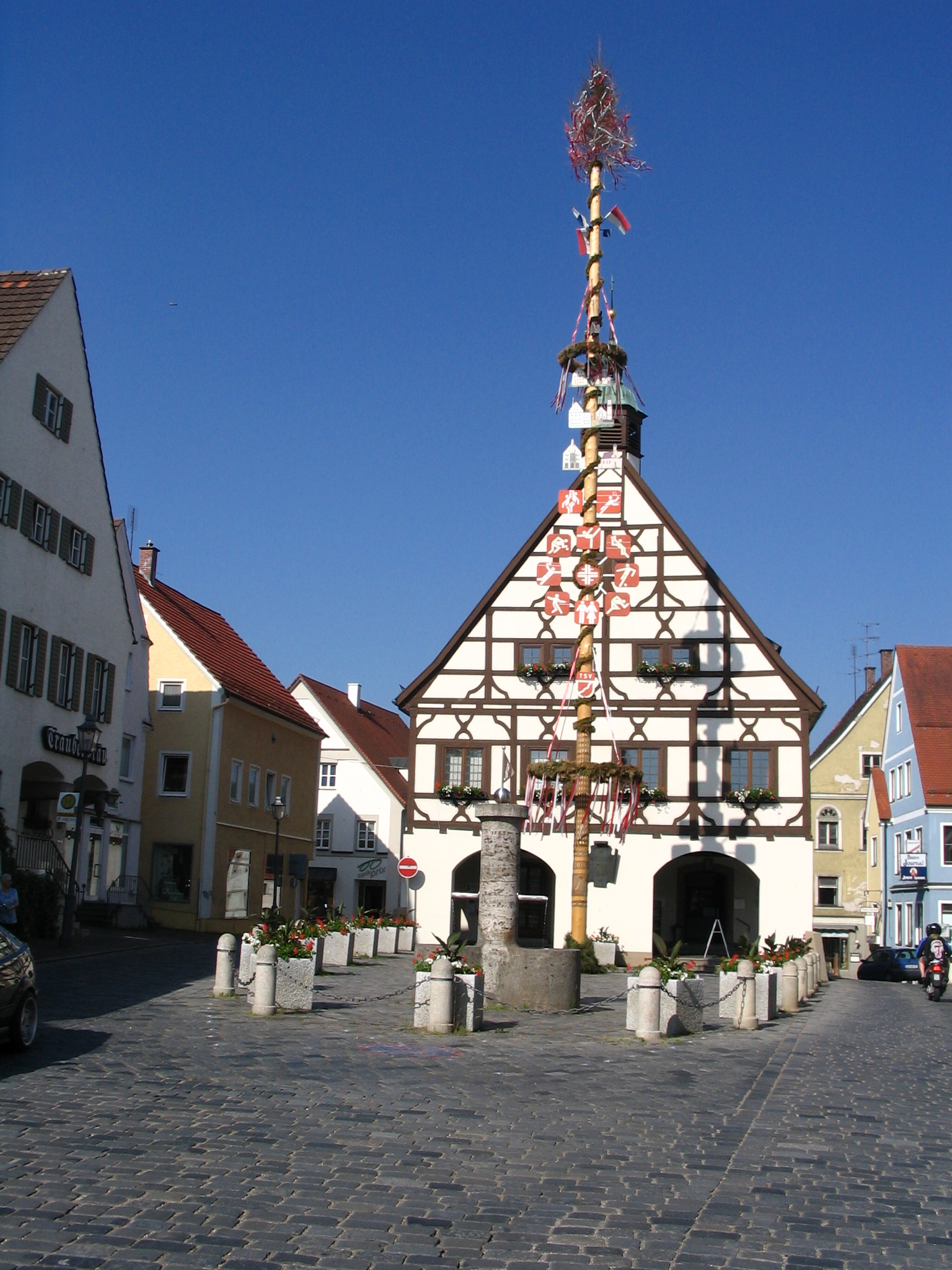
Market place and historic town hall

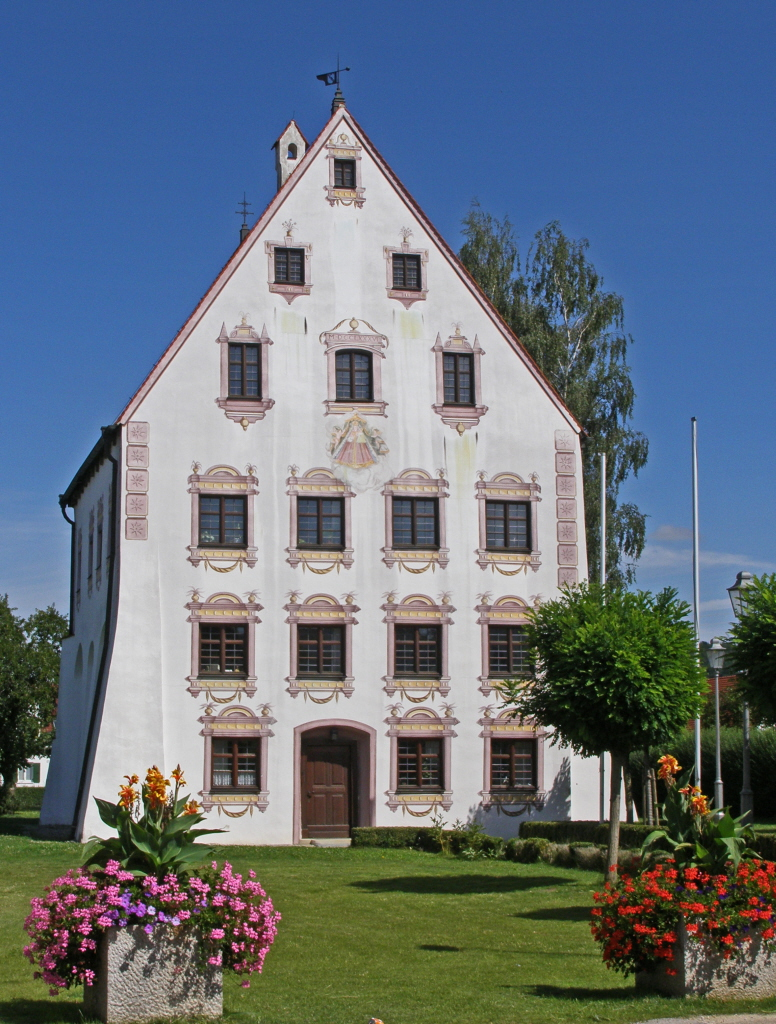
Castle of Hürben

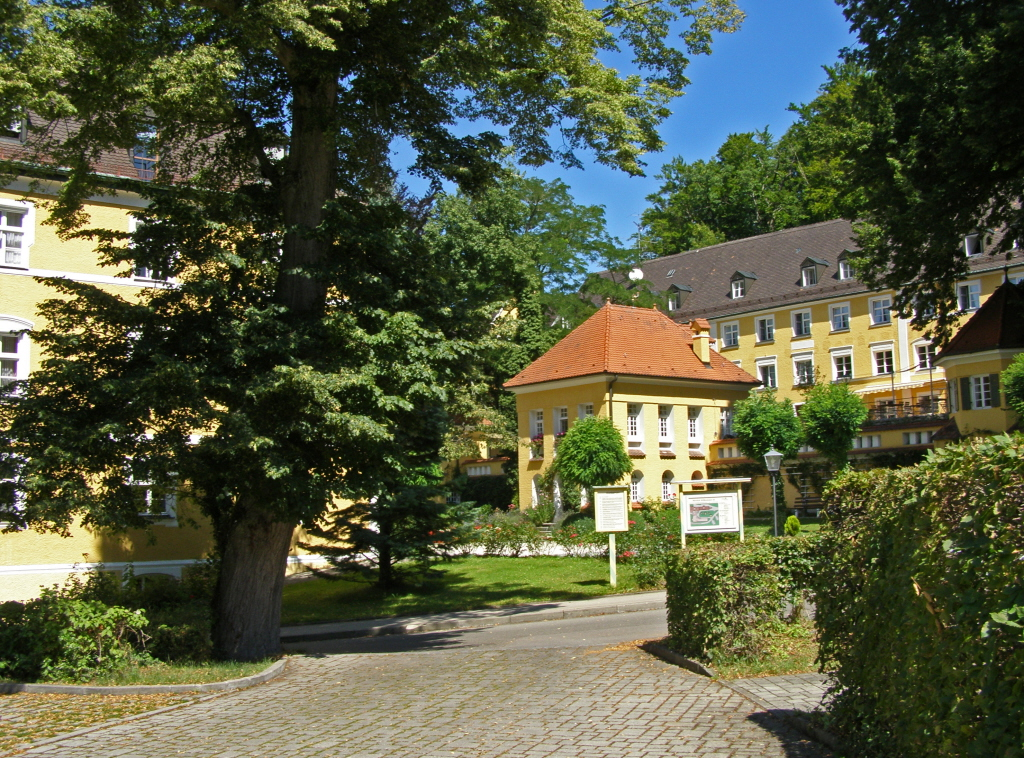
Krumbad

== Economy, transport and public institutions ==
In Krumbach, there are car suppliers, a paint factory, plant construction factories, weaving mills, wax factories, and a wall-to-wall carpeting factory.

Two Bundesstraßen pass Krumbach: the Bundesstraße 16 (B 16) Günzburg–Mindelheim and the Bundesstraße 300 (B 300) Memmingen–Augsburg. The distances to the Autobahnen 7, 8 and 96 are each approximately 25 kilometres. Furthermore, Krumbach has a railway station on the railway from Günzburg to Mindelheim (Mittelschwaben Railway), a loop line, which connects the main lines Bavarian Maximilian Railway (Munich–Augsburg–Ulm–Stuttgart) and the railway from Munich to Zurich via Buchloe, Memmingen and Lindau.

In Krumbach there are quite a few public institutions: police station, forestry commission office, planning department and several schools: secondary schools, grammar school and vocational schools;

== Miscellaneous ==
In the valley of Günz – approximately six kilometres west of Krumbach there is the Oberrieder Weiher, a flooded gravel pit and popular greenbelt recreation area. At the shores of this lake, there is a camping site.

== Sport ==
Breitenthal Speedway Stadium hosted the MC Krumbach motorcycle speedway team. It was a significant venue and hosted many important events, including qualifying rounds of the Speedway World Team Cup in 1973, 1974, 1975, 1978, 1979 and 1981 and a round of the Speedway World Team Cup in 1980.

== Notable births ==
- Franz Tausend (1884–1942), German alchemist and fraudster
- Gerd Müller (born 1955), politician (CSU)
- Volkher Häusler (born 1958), conductor and church musician
- Thomas Tuchel (born 1973), football coach

== See also ==
- Synagogues of the Swabian type (Krumbach)
