= Gutnach =

River in Germany

Location
- Country: Germany
- State: Bavaria

Physical characteristics
- Mouth
  - location: Haselbach
  - coordinates: 48.2100°N 10.3177°E
- Length: 19.1 km (11.9 mi)

Basin features
- Progression: Haselbach→ Günz→ Danube→ Black Sea

Gutnach is a river of Bavaria, Germany. It flows into the Haselbach near Ebershausen.

== See also ==
- List of rivers of Bavaria
