= Krebsbach (Westliche Günz) =

River in Germany

Location
- Country: Germany
- State: Bavaria

Physical characteristics
- Mouth
  - location: Westliche Günz
  - coordinates: 48.0500°N 10.2919°E
- Length: 19.7 km (12.2 mi)

Basin features
- Progression: Westliche Günz→ Günz→ Danube→ Black Sea

Krebsbach is a river of Bavaria, Germany. It is a left tributary of the Westliche Günz (western Günz) near Lauben.

== See also ==
- List of rivers of Bavaria
