= Otterbach (Klosterbeurener Bach) =

River in Bavaria, Germany

Location
- Country: Germany
- States: Bavaria

Physical characteristics
- Mouth
  - location: Klosterbeurener Bach
  - coordinates: 48.1153°N 10.2567°E

Basin features
- Progression: Klosterbeurener Bach→ Günz→ Danube→ Black Sea

Otterbach (German pronunciation: [ˈɔtɐbax]) is a river of Bavaria, Germany. It is a left tributary of the Klosterbeurener Bach in Klosterbeuren, a part of Babenhausen.

== See also ==
- List of rivers of Bavaria
