= Oberrieder Weiher =

- Location within Germany
- Location: Bavarian Swabia, Bavaria, Germany
- Coordinates: 48°13′33″N 10°17′30″E
- Type: artificial lake
- Surface area: 34.7 hectares (86 acres)

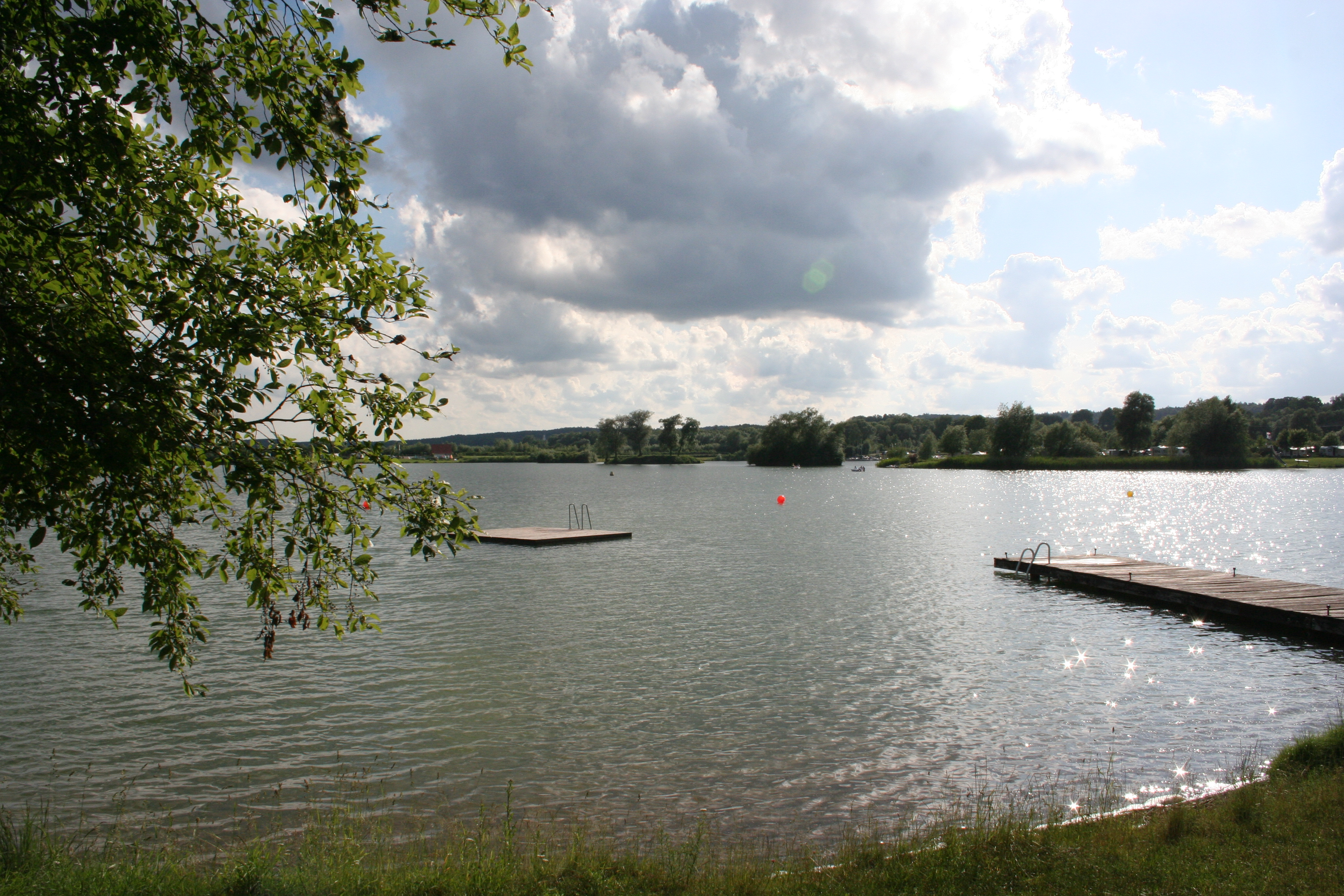
A dock floating on the lake

The Oberrieder Weiher is like many other ponds in the valleys of Günz and Mindel a former gravel pit which is filled with ground water. The pond is located near the river Günz in the municipality of Breitenthal in the district of Günzburg. Because of this origin as gravel pit the form of the Oberrieder Weiher is nearly a square, covering 34.7 hectares (86 acres). Sometimes it is said that it is the biggest flooded gravel pit in Bavarian Swabia.

The Oberrieder Weiher is a popular greenbelt recreation area. The northeastern shores have been used as a swimming area for many years. On the other shores are a campsite, a sailing club, and a surfing school. The Oberrieder Weiher is used by divers, too.
