= Niederraunau =

Quarter of the town Krumbach in Bavaria, Germany

Coordinates: 48°13′26″N 10°22′45″E

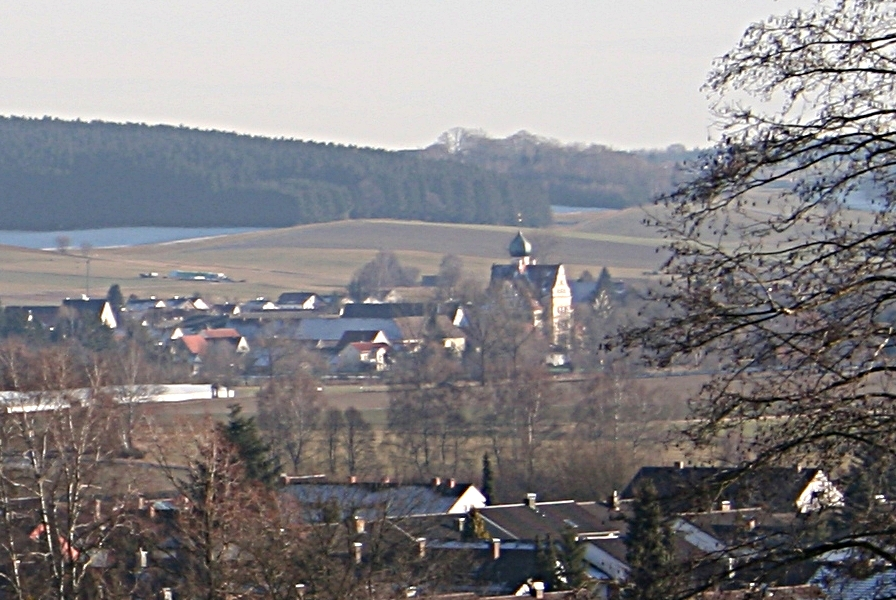
Niederraunau from northwest

Niederraunau is a quarter of the town Krumbach in Günzburg (district), Swabia, Bavaria, Germany.

== Geography ==
Niederraunau (Elevation 518 m) is in the valley of the little river Kammel two kilometres south of Krumbach in the natural region Lower Iller-Lech Gravel Plateau. The hills between the valleys of Kammel and the neighboring valleys of Günz and Mindel are covered with forest. Niederraunau has a station at the Mittelschwaben Railway and it is at the Bundesstraße 16.

== History ==
- Between 1100 and 1200: Niederraunau was founded
- Between 1494 and 1495: the village got the right to hold a market
- 1613: the village was given a coat of arms
- After World War II: Niederraunau was the site of a post World War II American sector displaced person camp.
- 1978: Niederraunau became a quarter of the town Krumbach; before this time the village was its own municipality.

== Sights and attractions ==
Sights and attractions found in Niederraunau include:

- The castle of Schloss Niederraunau
- The church Hlgst. Dreifaltigkeit (mentioned in the year 1067; was at the beginning romanesque; between 1617 and 1629 the church got its current look)
- A penitence cross from the medieval era at the Bundesstraße 16
- The Ecce Homo Chapel

== Companies and organizations ==
Companies and organizations based in Niederraunau include:

- FAIST Anlagenbau GmbH, a manufacturer of noise control facilities and aero-acoustic wind tunnel treatments
- Scheppach, a manufacturer of building machinery
