= Winterbach =

Winterbach may refer to:

== Places ==
- Winterbach, Baden-Württemberg, Germany
- Winterbach, Bavaria, Germany
- Winterbach, Bad Kreuznach, Rhineland-Palatinate, Germany
- Winterbach, Südwestpfalz, Rhineland-Palatinate, Germany
- Winterbach (St. Wendel), Saarland, Germany
- Winterbach, a station on the Mariazell Railway, Austria

== People ==
- Lettie Viljoen, a pseudonym of South African author Ingrid Winterbach (born 1948)
