= Krumbach (Verwaltungsgemeinschaft) =

- Verwaltungsgemeinschaft
- Location of Krumbach within Günzburg district
- Interactive map of Krumbach
- Location within Germany Location within Bavaria
- Coordinates: 48°15′N 10°22′E
- Country: Germany
- State: Bavaria
- Admin. region: Swabia
- District: Günzburg
- Seat: Krumbach
- Subdivisions: 6 municipalities

Area
  - Total: 76.59 km^{2} (29.57 sq mi)

Population (2025-12-31)
  - Total: 6,295
  - Density: 82.19/km^{2} (212.9/sq mi)
- Time zone: UTC+01:00 (CET)
  - Summer (DST): UTC+02:00 (CEST)
- Website: www.vg-krumbach.de

Krumbach is a Verwaltungsgemeinschaft (municipal association) in the district of Günzburg in Bavaria, Germany. Its seat is in Krumbach, itself not part of the Verwaltungsgemeinschaft.

It consists of the following municipalities:

1. Aletshausen
2. Breitenthal
3. Deisenhausen
4. Ebershausen
5. Waltenhausen
6. Wiesenbach
