= Faist =

Faist may refer to:

- Chinese ritual mastery traditions, sometimes rendered as "Faism"
- FAIST Anlagenbau GmbH, manufacturer of noise control facilities and aero-acoustic wind tunnel treatment.
- Faist, a British manufacturer of electro-mechanical systems and components
