= Scheppach (company) =

German cement mixer manufacturer

Scheppach is a German manufacturer of cement mixers and building machinery, and also a manufacturer of woodworking machinery. Scheppach products are designed in Germany and made in China.

== History ==
The company was founded in 1927 in Niederraunau by Josef Scheppach (1887-1974). The company turned over 106 million euros in 2015/16.

Once known for its agricultural machines, firewood circular saws, and other woodworking tools. Josef Scheppach founded the company during the Weimar Republic era, when the economic conditions were challenging. He started by manufacturing firewood circular saws, malt mills, and providing repairs for agricultural machines.

Scheppach moved from Krumback, Niederraunau to a new location in Ichenhausen in 1961. By the mid-70s, Scheppach departed from the area of agricultural machinery and focussed on developing and producing woodworking machines. By honing in on woodworking machines, Scheppach was able to establish itself as a specialist in this niche segment and expand its product range to include a variety of machines and accessories catering to woodworking enthusiasts, professionals, and industries.

Expanding the product range, in 2009-10, to include construction machinery and heavy trade equipment by introducing plate vibrators, concrete mixers, hand-held agitators, dumpers, demolition equipment and battery-powered devices, Scheppach extended its offerings beyond woodworking and entered the construction equipment market.

Since 2014, the range of gardening machinery and tools has become a part of Scheppach’s portfolio.

Founding of Woodster GmbH

With the introduction of the Woodster range in 2005, Scheppach aimed to tap into the consumer DIY market.

Genpower and Scheppach

In 2023, Genpower secured the UK & Ireland distribution for Scheppach battery-powered devices and electrical tools such as bandsaws, pillar drills, dust extractors, bench grinders, fret saws and more.

Today it mainly sells under the Scheppach label, but no longer produces products in Germany. With the founding of the 100% subsidiary Woodster GmbH, sales activities in the DIY and discount sectors started and the portfolio was continuously expanded. In 2016 the construction of the new administration building in Ichenhausen began, where new office space of around 1000 m^{2} was to be created.

== Structure ==
It is situated in Ichenhausen, in Günzburg, in western Bavaria, close to Baden-Württemberg. The company consists of Scheppach GmbH and Woodster GmbH.

The UK Distribution is managed by Genpower Ltd, under Scheppach.uk. The headquarters are in Pembroke Dock, Wales.

== Products ==
- Bandsaws
- Chainsaws
- Riding mower
- Cement mixers
- Garden electrical equipment
- Hedge trimmer
- Table saws
- Log splitter
- Scroll saws

== See also ==
- Einhell and Stihl, also from Bavaria
