= Breitenthal Speedway Stadium =

Stadium near Krumbach in Germany

- Location: 86488 Breitenthal, Germany
- Coordinates: 48°14′15″N 10°18′26″E
- Opened: 1971

The Breitenthal Speedway Stadium also known as the Günztal Stadion or MC Krumbach Speedway Stadium was a motorcycle speedway stadium, 5 km west of Krumbach between Breitenthal and Nattenhausen in Bavaria, Germany. The site is located adjacent to the St2018 road, on the north side.

== History ==
The stadium was built and opened in 1971. MC Krumbach rode their home fixtures at the track, when competing in the German Team Speedway Championship. The facility was the home track of riders such as Manfred Poschenreider and Hans Wassermann.

The track was a significant venue for motorcycle speedway and hosted many important events. These included qualifying rounds of the Speedway World Team Cup in 1973, 1974, 1975, 1978, 1979 and 1981. Additionally, it hosted a round of the Speedway World Team Cup in 1980.

The speedway team folded due to financial issues and the track failed speedway safety regulations which has resulted in no speedway events since the early 2010s. However, the site remains in place and it has been used as a tractor pulling event venue in recent years.

== MC Krumbach ==
The speedway team MC Krumbach were three-times champions of West Germany, having won the West German Speedway Championship in 1975, 1976 and 1983.
