= Haselbach (Günz) =

River in Germany

Location
- Country: Germany
- State: Bavaria

Physical characteristics
- Mouth
  - location: Günz
  - coordinates: 48.2356°N 10.3133°E
- Length: 24.1 km (15.0 mi)

Basin features
- Progression: Günz→ Danube→ Black Sea

Haselbach (German pronunciation: [ˈhaːzl̩bax]) is a river of Bavaria, Germany. It is a right tributary of the Günz near Breitenthal.

== See also ==
- List of rivers of Bavaria
