= Scheppach =

Scheppach may refer to:

- Scheppach (company), German manufacturer of cement mixers and other machinery
- Scheppach (Bretzfeld), village within Bretzfeld, Hohenlohe district, Baden-Württemberg, Germany
