= Thannhausen (Verwaltungsgemeinschaft) =

- Verwaltungsgemeinschaft
- Location of Thannhausen within Günzburg district
- Interactive map of Thannhausen
- Location within Germany Location within Bavaria
- Coordinates: 48°17′N 10°28′E
- Country: Germany
- State: Bavaria
- Admin. region: Swabia
- District: Günzburg
- Seat: Thannhausen
- Subdivisions: 3 municipalities

Area
  - Total: 53.13 km^{2} (20.51 sq mi)

Population (2025-12-31)
  - Total: 9,665
  - Density: 181.9/km^{2} (471.2/sq mi)
- Time zone: UTC+01:00 (CET)
  - Summer (DST): UTC+02:00 (CEST)
- Website: www.vg-thannhausen.de

Thannhausen is a Verwaltungsgemeinschaft (municipal association) in the district of Günzburg in Bavaria, Germany. Its seat is in Thannhausen.

It consists of the following municipalities:

1. Balzhausen
2. Münsterhausen
3. Thannhausen
