= Ziemetshausen (Verwaltungsgemeinschaft) =

- Verwaltungsgemeinschaft
- Location of Ziemetshausen within Günzburg district
- Interactive map of Ziemetshausen
- Location within Germany Location within Bavaria
- Coordinates: 48°18′N 10°32′E
- Country: Germany
- State: Bavaria
- Admin. region: Swabia
- District: Günzburg
- Seat: Ziemetshausen
- Subdivisions: 2 municipalities

Area
  - Total: 60.57 km^{2} (23.39 sq mi)

Population (2025-12-31)
  - Total: 4,357
  - Density: 71.93/km^{2} (186.3/sq mi)
- Time zone: UTC+01:00 (CET)
  - Summer (DST): UTC+02:00 (CEST)
- Website: www.vgziemetshausen.de

Ziemetshausen is a Verwaltungsgemeinschaft (municipal association) in the district of Günzburg in Bavaria, Germany. Its seat is in Ziemetshausen.

It consists of the following municipalities:

1. Aichen
2. Ziemetshausen
