= Ichenhausen (Verwaltungsgemeinschaft) =

- Verwaltungsgemeinschaft
- Location of Ichenhausen within Günzburg district
- Interactive map of Ichenhausen
- Location within Germany Location within Bavaria
- Coordinates: 48°22′N 10°18′E
- Country: Germany
- State: Bavaria
- Admin. region: Swabia
- District: Günzburg
- Seat: Ichenhausen
- Subdivisions: 3 municipalities

Area
  - Total: 60.17 km^{2} (23.23 sq mi)

Population (2025-12-31)
  - Total: 11,899
  - Density: 197.8/km^{2} (512.2/sq mi)
- Time zone: UTC+01:00 (CET)
  - Summer (DST): UTC+02:00 (CEST)

Ichenhausen is a Verwaltungsgemeinschaft (municipal association) in the district of Günzburg in Bavaria, Germany. Its seat is in Ichenhausen.

It consists of the following municipalities:

1. Ellzee
2. Ichenhausen
3. Waldstetten
