= Östliche Günz =

River in Germany

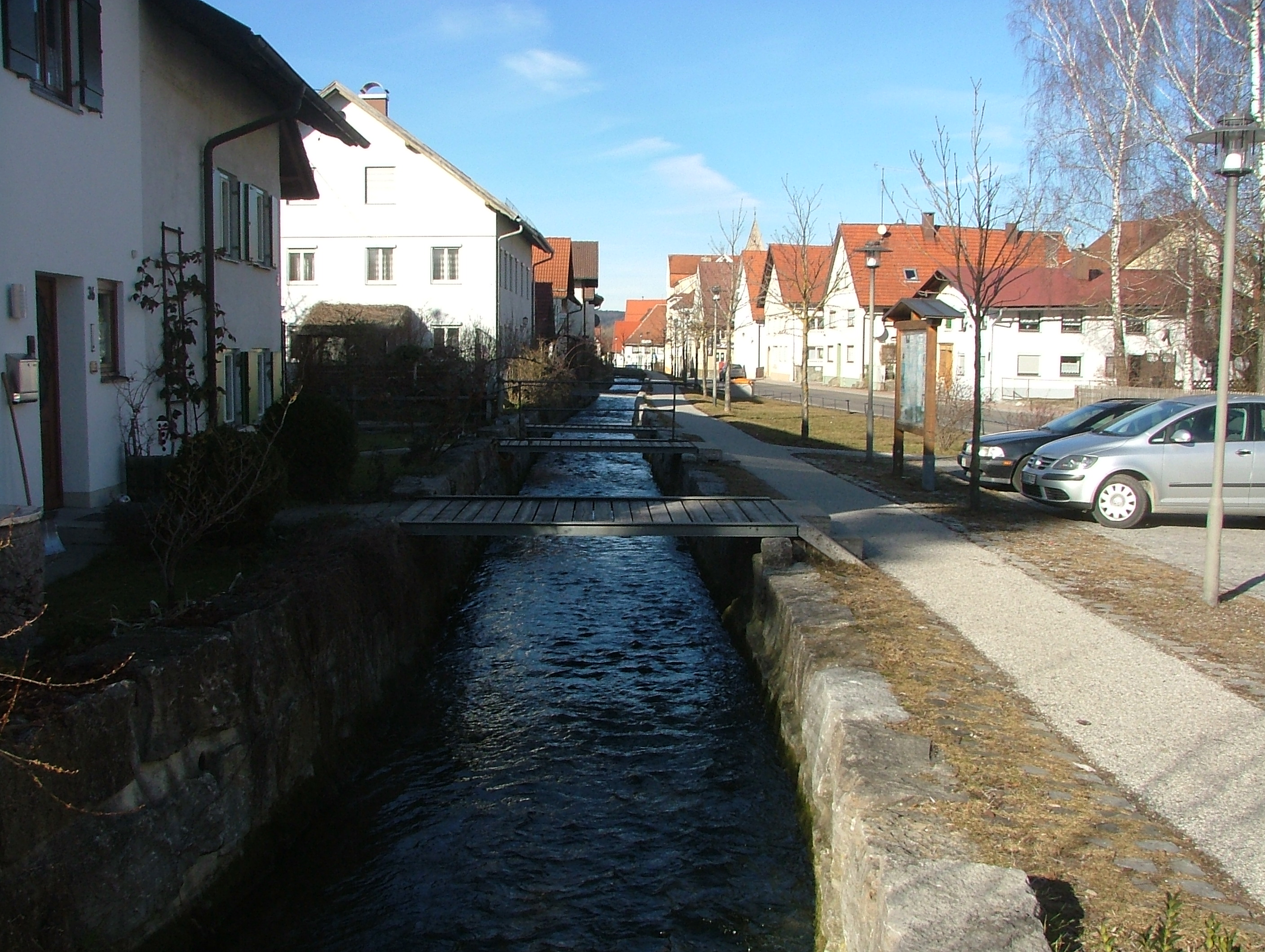
- The Östliche Günz in Obergünzburg

Location
- Country: Germany
- State: Bavaria

Physical characteristics
- Mouth
  - location: Günz
  - coordinates: 48.0654°N 10.3015°E
- Length: 38.7 km (24.0 mi)
- Basin size: 111 km^{2} (43 sq mi)

Basin features
- Progression: Günz→ Danube→ Black Sea

The Östliche Günz (or eastern Günz) is a river in Bavaria, Germany. At its confluence with the Westliche Günz near Lauben, the Günz is formed.

== See also ==
- List of rivers of Bavaria
