= Haldenwang (Verwaltungsgemeinschaft) =

- Verwaltungsgemeinschaft
- Location of Haldenwang within Günzburg district
- Interactive map of Haldenwang
- Location within Germany Location within Bavaria
- Coordinates: 48°26′N 10°27′E
- Country: Germany
- State: Bavaria
- Admin. region: Swabia
- District: Günzburg
- Seat: Haldenwang
- Subdivisions: 5 municipalities

Area
  - Total: 59.72 km^{2} (23.06 sq mi)

Population (2025-12-31)
  - Total: 6,263
  - Density: 104.9/km^{2} (271.6/sq mi)
- Time zone: UTC+01:00 (CET)
  - Summer (DST): UTC+02:00 (CEST)
- Website: www.vgem-hw.de

Haldenwang is a Verwaltungsgemeinschaft (municipal association) in the district of Günzburg in Bavaria, Germany. Its seat is in Haldenwang.

It consists of the following municipalities:

1. Dürrlauingen
2. Haldenwang
3. Landensberg
4. Röfingen
5. Winterbach
