= Kötz (Verwaltungsgemeinschaft) =

- Verwaltungsgemeinschaft
- Location of Kötz within Günzburg district
- Interactive map of Kötz
- Location within Germany Location within Bavaria
- Coordinates: 48°24′N 10°17′E
- Country: Germany
- State: Bavaria
- Admin. region: Swabia
- District: Günzburg
- Seat: Kötz
- Subdivisions: 2 municipalities

Area
  - Total: 28.29 km^{2} (10.92 sq mi)

Population (2025-12-31)
  - Total: 4,889
  - Density: 172.8/km^{2} (447.6/sq mi)
- Time zone: UTC+01:00 (CET)
  - Summer (DST): UTC+02:00 (CEST)

Kötz is a Verwaltungsgemeinschaft (municipal association) in the district of Günzburg in Bavaria, Germany. Its seat is in Kötz.

It consists of the following municipalities:

1. Bubesheim
2. Kötz
