= Landensberg =

- Municipality
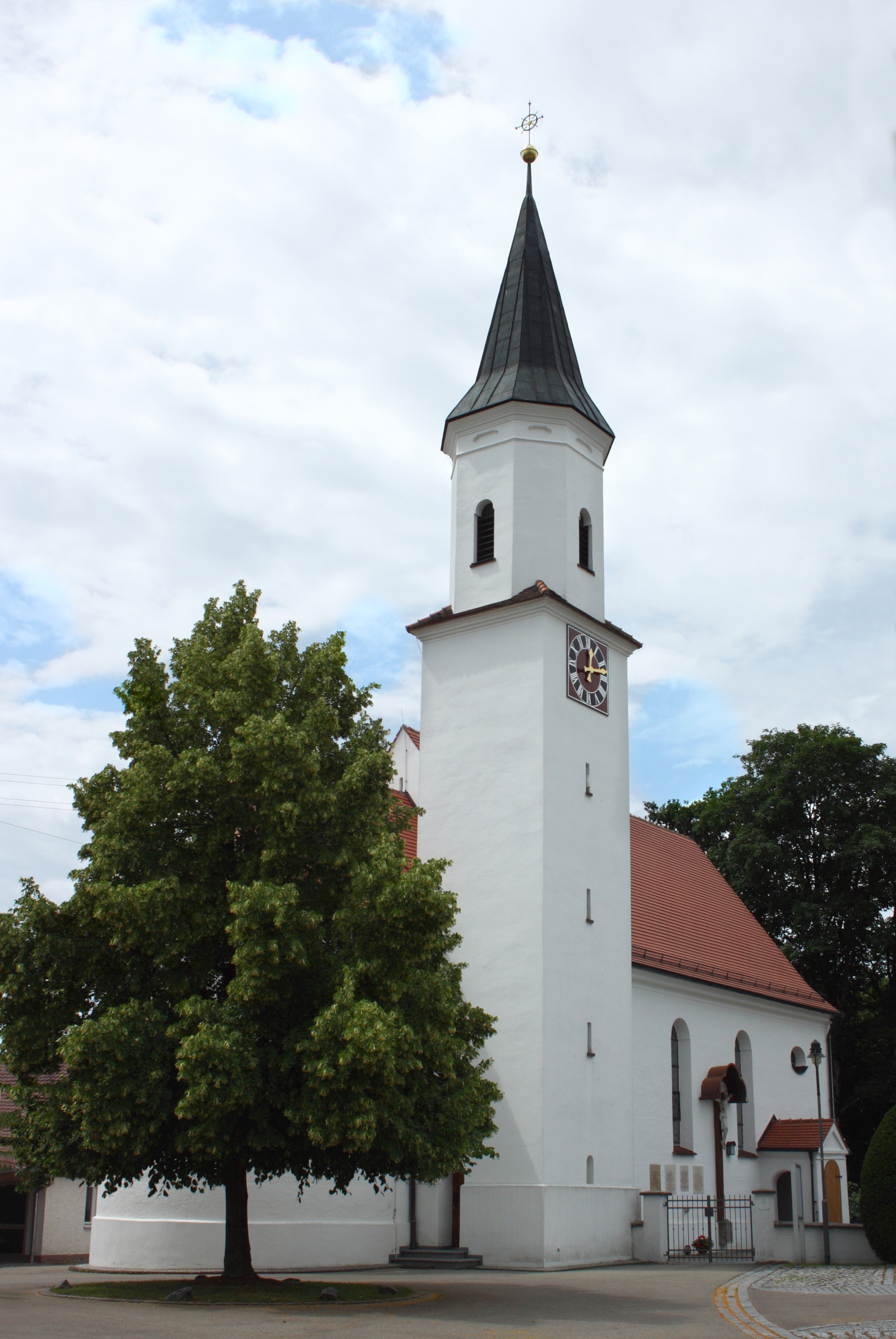
- Church of the Holy Cross

- Coat of arms

- Location of Landensberg within Günzburg district
- Interactive map of Landensberg
- Location within Germany Location within Bavaria
- Coordinates: 48°26′N 10°32′E
- Country: Germany
- State: Bavaria
- Admin. region: Schwaben
- District: Günzburg
- Municipal assoc.: Haldenwang

Government
  - Mayor (2023–29): Leonhard Steinle

Area
  - Total: 7.95 km^{2} (3.07 sq mi)
- Elevation: 508 m (1,667 ft)

Population (2025-12-31)
  - Total: 647
  - Density: 81.4/km^{2} (211/sq mi)
- Time zone: UTC+01:00 (CET)
  - Summer (DST): UTC+02:00 (CEST)
- Postal codes: 89361
- Dialling codes: 08222
- Vehicle registration: GZ

Landensberg (German pronunciation: [ˈlandn̩sbɛʁk]) is a municipality in the district of Günzburg in Bavaria, Germany.
