= Klosterbeurener Bach =

River in Germany

Location
- Country: Germany
- State: Bavaria

Physical characteristics
- Mouth
  - location: Günz
  - coordinates: 48.1418°N 10.2489°E
- Length: 13.8 km (8.6 mi)

Basin features
- Progression: Günz→ Danube→ Black Sea

Klosterbeurener Bach is a river of Germany, in the Unterallgäu district of Bavaria. It is 13 kilometres (8.1 mi) long and flows in a northerly direction. It flows into the Günz in Babenhausen.

== See also ==
- List of rivers of Bavaria
