= Röfingen =

- Municipality
- Coat of arms

- Location of Röfingen within Günzburg district
- Interactive map of Röfingen
- Location within Germany Location within Bavaria
- Coordinates: 48°26′N 10°26′E
- Country: Germany
- State: Bavaria
- Admin. region: Schwaben
- District: Günzburg
- Municipal assoc.: Haldenwang

Government
  - Mayor (2020–26): Hans Brendle

Area
  - Total: 6.62 km^{2} (2.56 sq mi)
- Elevation: 474 m (1,555 ft)

Population (2025-12-31)
  - Total: 1,209
  - Density: 183/km^{2} (473/sq mi)
- Time zone: UTC+01:00 (CET)
  - Summer (DST): UTC+02:00 (CEST)
- Postal codes: 89365
- Dialling codes: 08222
- Vehicle registration: GZ

Röfingen (German pronunciation: [ˈʁøːfɪŋən]) is a municipality in the district of Günzburg in Bavaria in Germany.
