= Mittelschwaben =

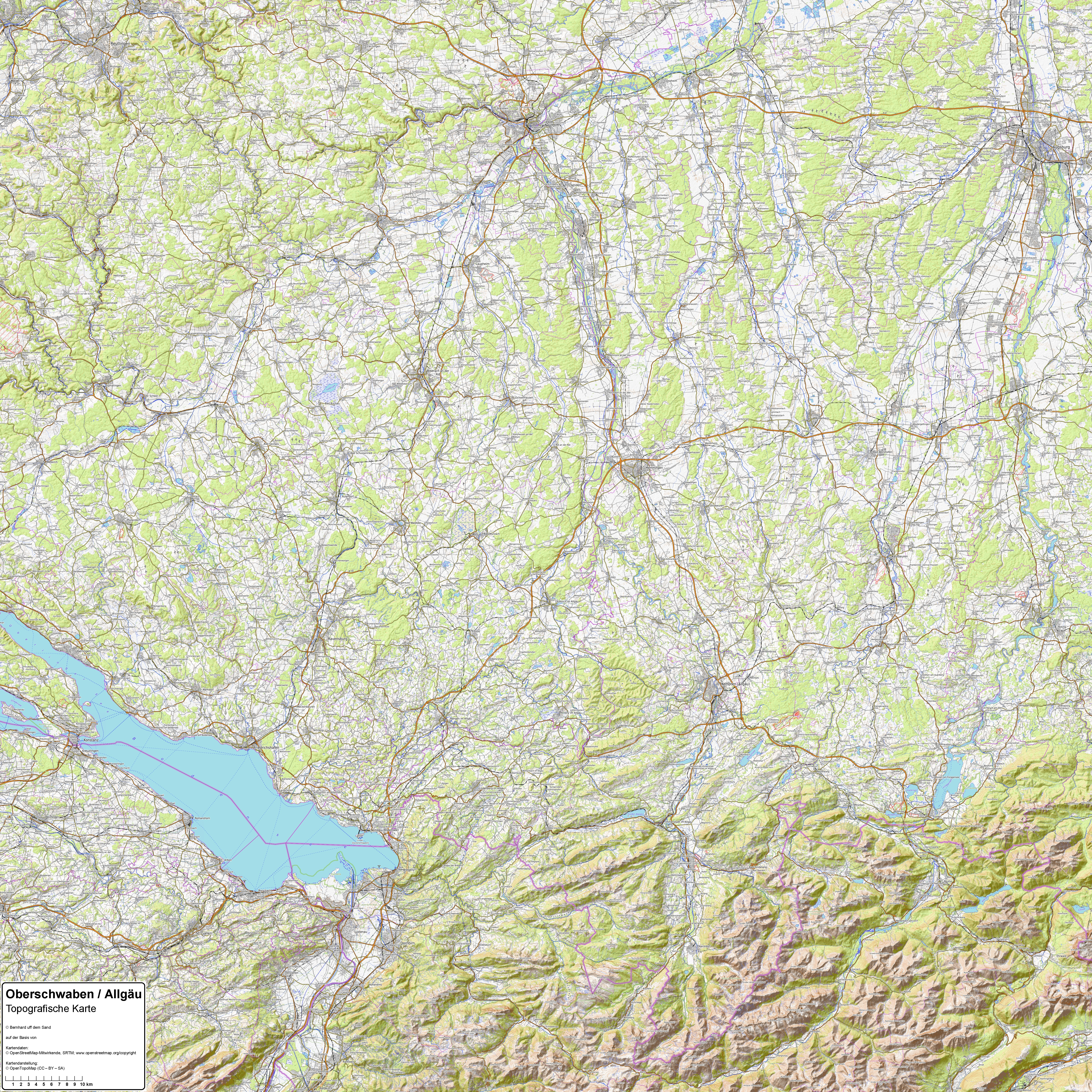

Mittelschwaben is a part of the Bavarian administrative region Swabia. It consists of the districts Günzburg, Neu-Ulm, Unterallgäu and the district-free town Memmingen.

The name Mittelschwaben was created in the 19th century to distinguish the Bavarian parts of Oberschwaben from the Baden-Württembergian.

== Borders ==
In the west (to the Baden-Württembergian Oberschwaben), Mittelschawben borders the river Iller. In the north (to the Donauried), it borders the south of the Danube-valley. To the east (to the Stauden, Reischenau and Holzwinkel, Mittelschwaben borders the three parts of the Augsburg-Westliche Wälder Nature Park: the rivers Mindel and Flossach. In the south (to the Allgäu), it borders the terminal moraines of the Würm glaciation.
