= Waldstetten, Bavaria =

Waldstetten
- Municipality
- Coat of arms

- Location of Waldstetten within Günzburg district
- Interactive map of Waldstetten
- Location within Germany Location within Bavaria
- Coordinates: 48°21′N 10°18′E
- Country: Germany
- State: Bavaria
- Admin. region: Schwaben
- District: Günzburg
- Municipal assoc.: Ichenhausen

Government
  - Mayor (2020–26): Michael Kusch

Area
  - Total: 11.13 km^{2} (4.30 sq mi)
- Elevation: 497 m (1,631 ft)

Population (2025-12-31)
  - Total: 1,287
  - Density: 115.6/km^{2} (299.5/sq mi)
- Time zone: UTC+01:00 (CET)
  - Summer (DST): UTC+02:00 (CEST)
- Postal codes: 89367
- Dialling codes: 08223
- Vehicle registration: GZ

Waldstetten (German pronunciation: [valtˈʃtɛtn̩]) is a municipality in the district of Günzburg in Bavaria in Germany.
