= Bubesheim =

- Municipality
- Coat of arms

- Location of Bubesheim within Günzburg district
- Interactive map of Bubesheim
- Location within Germany Location within Bavaria
- Coordinates: 48°26′N 10°16′E
- Country: Germany
- State: Bavaria
- Admin. region: Schwaben
- District: Günzburg
- Municipal assoc.: Kötz

Government
  - Mayor (2020–26): Gerhard Sobczyk (CSU)

Area
  - Total: 7.76 km^{2} (3.00 sq mi)
- Elevation: 466 m (1,529 ft)

Population (2025-12-31)
  - Total: 1,570
  - Density: 202/km^{2} (524/sq mi)
- Time zone: UTC+01:00 (CET)
  - Summer (DST): UTC+02:00 (CEST)
- Postal codes: 89347
- Dialling codes: 08221
- Vehicle registration: GZ

Bubesheim (German pronunciation: [ˈbuːbəshaɪm]) is a municipality in the district of Günzburg in Bavaria in Germany.
