= Ziemetshausen =

- Municipality
- Coat of arms

- Location of Ziemetshausen within Günzburg district
- Interactive map of Ziemetshausen
- Location within Germany Location within Bavaria
- Coordinates: 48°18′N 10°32′E
- Country: Germany
- State: Bavaria
- Admin. region: Schwaben
- District: Günzburg
- Municipal assoc.: Ziemetshausen

Government
  - Mayor (2020–26): Ralf Wetzel (CSU)

Area
  - Total: 42.95 km^{2} (16.58 sq mi)
- Elevation: 475 m (1,558 ft)

Population (2025-12-31)
  - Total: 3,177
  - Density: 73.97/km^{2} (191.6/sq mi)
- Time zone: UTC+01:00 (CET)
  - Summer (DST): UTC+02:00 (CEST)
- Postal codes: 86473
- Dialling codes: 08284
- Vehicle registration: GZ
- Website: www.vgziemetshausen.de

Ziemetshausen (German pronunciation: [tsiːmɛtsˈhaʊzn̩]) is a municipality in the district of Günzburg in Bavaria in Germany.

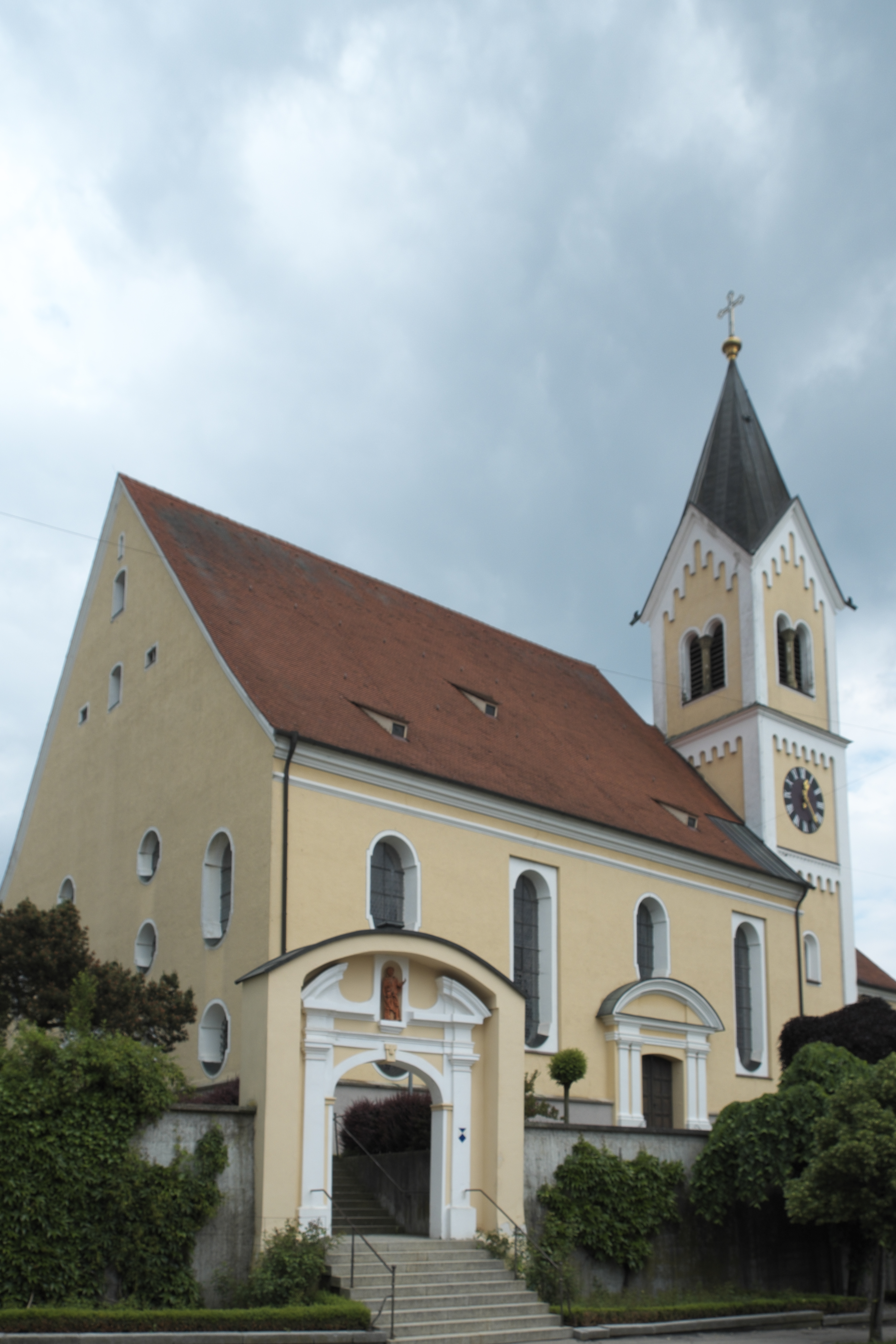
Ziemetshausen St. Peter und Paul

== Mayors ==
The current mayor, Anton Birle (CSU) was elected in 2002 (further re-elected in 2008 and 2014). He is the successor of Anton Weber (Unabhängige Wählergemeinschaft).
