= Winterbach, Bavaria =

Winterbach
- Municipality
- Coat of arms

- Location of Winterbach within Günzburg district
- Interactive map of Winterbach
- Location within Germany Location within Bavaria
- Coordinates: 48°28′N 10°29′E
- Country: Germany
- State: Bavaria
- Admin. region: Schwaben
- District: Günzburg
- Municipal assoc.: Haldenwang

Government
  - Mayor (2020–26): Reinhard Schieferle

Area
  - Total: 14.83 km^{2} (5.73 sq mi)
- Elevation: 462 m (1,516 ft)

Population (2025-12-31)
  - Total: 789
  - Density: 53.2/km^{2} (138/sq mi)
- Time zone: UTC+01:00 (CET)
  - Summer (DST): UTC+02:00 (CEST)
- Postal codes: 89368
- Dialling codes: 08283
- Vehicle registration: GZ
- Website: winterbach.bnv-gz.de

Winterbach (German pronunciation: [ˈvɪntɐbax]) is a municipality in the district of Günzburg in Bavaria in Germany.

== Mayor ==
The mayor is Reinhard Schieferle, in office since May 2020.

Previous mayors:

- 2008–2020: Karl Oberschmid (Wählervereinigung Waldkirch).
- 1980–2008: Josef Schieferle
