= Waltenhausen =

- Municipality
- Coat of arms

- Location of Waltenhausen within Günzburg district
- Interactive map of Waltenhausen
- Location within Germany Location within Bavaria
- Coordinates: 48°12′N 10°22′E
- Country: Germany
- State: Bavaria
- Admin. region: Schwaben
- District: Günzburg
- Municipal assoc.: Krumbach

Government
  - Mayor (2020–26): Alois Rampp (FW)

Area
  - Total: 13.43 km^{2} (5.19 sq mi)
- Elevation: 547 m (1,795 ft)

Population (2025-12-31)
  - Total: 742
  - Density: 55.2/km^{2} (143/sq mi)
- Time zone: UTC+01:00 (CET)
  - Summer (DST): UTC+02:00 (CEST)
- Postal codes: 86480
- Dialling codes: 08263
- Vehicle registration: GZ

Waltenhausen (German pronunciation: [valtn̩ˈhaʊzn̩]) is a municipality in the district of Günzburg in Bavaria in Germany.
