= Kötz =

- Municipality
- Coat of arms

- Location of Kötz within Günzburg district
- Interactive map of Kötz
- Location within Germany Location within Bavaria
- Coordinates: 48°25′N 10°17′E
- Country: Germany
- State: Bavaria
- Admin. region: Schwaben
- District: Günzburg
- Municipal assoc.: Kötz

Government
  - Mayor (2020–26): Sabine Ertle (FW)

Area
  - Total: 20.53 km^{2} (7.93 sq mi)
- Elevation: 475 m (1,558 ft)

Population (2025-12-31)
  - Total: 3,319
  - Density: 161.7/km^{2} (418.7/sq mi)
- Time zone: UTC+01:00 (CET)
  - Summer (DST): UTC+02:00 (CEST)
- Postal codes: 89359
- Dialling codes: 08221
- Vehicle registration: GZ
- Website: www.vg-koetz.de

Kötz (German pronunciation: [kœts]) is a municipality in the district of Günzburg in Bavaria in Germany.

== Famous people ==
- Dennis Chessa, footballer for Bayern Munich II
