= FAIST Anlagenbau GmbH =

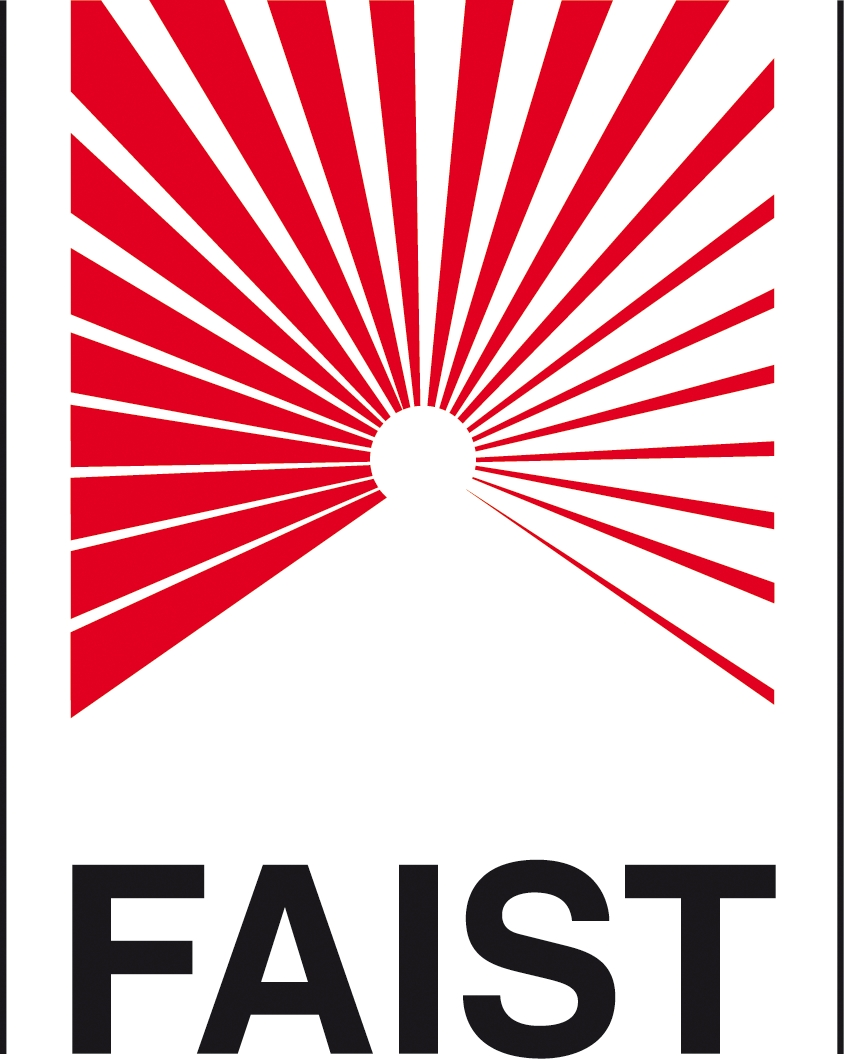
- Industry: Noise control
- Founded: 1904
- Founder: Michael Faist
- Headquarters: Niederraunau (Bavaria), Germany
- Key people: Roger Schmidt (CEO), Wilfried Thies (CSO)
- Products: Noise control systems, acoustic test chambers
- Revenue: € 40.000.000 (2009)
- Number of employees: 245 (2010)
- Website: www.faist.de

FAIST Anlagenbau GmbH is one of the biggest manufacturer of noise control facilities and aero-acoustic wind tunnel treatment. The company which is located in Niederraunau (Bavaria, Germany) manufactures and installs noise control installations, noise control enclosures as well as acoustic test chambers and aero-acoustic wind tunnels worldwide.

== History ==
FAIST Anlagenbau GmbH was founded and incorporated in the trade registry by Michael Faist in 1904. First the company produced products of felt. FAIST was the first company to introduce self-sticking insulation material on the market in 1960. Simultaneously, the manufacturing of multi-layered mats for VW and Daimler-Benz began. 1974 a new product division "FAIST Anlagenbau" was developed. In this division mainly industrial noise reduction enclosures were produced. 1996 the company moved to its own location in Niederraunau (Bavaria) and over the years the company developed to one of the biggest manufacturer of noise control facilities worldwide. Today FAIST is leading the world market in the division of noise control enclosure of print machines. This division contained 20% of the turnover in 2006. Besides acoustic measurement rooms and power plants main business fields of FAIST are aero-acoustic wind tunnels and classical soundproofing measures for printing machines in 2007. On March 31 the most successful business year ended for the company with a turnover of 40.000.000 euro. Majority owner and one of the Managing Directors of FAIST Anlagenbau GmbH is Michael Faist.

FAIST Headquarters at Niederraunau

== Patents and licences ==
The company is patent holder for specially designed silencer arrangements in the Air Intake section of power generating plants (combined cycle). In the section of acoustic measurement rooms the technology of the broadband compact absorbers was developed in cooperation with the Fraunhofer institute for building physics. The company owns the licence of distribution, production and installation these absorbers in acoustic measurement rooms.

== Products ==
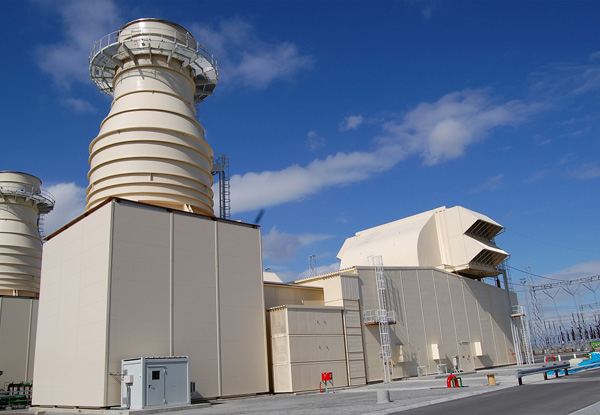
Acoustic Enclosure for Gas Turbines

Pass-by Test Cell

FAIST Anlagenbau GmbH produces noise control systems, acoustic measurement rooms and test cells, Air-Intake/Exhaust-systems, metal structures and steel structures, powder coating and sheet metal fabrication. The company also plan and arranged noise surveys and acoustic engineering at workplaces.

== Locations ==
- Headquarters: FAIST Anlagenbau GmbH, Niederraunau
- Branch offices: Neuwied, Frankenthal
- FAIST SARL, Anthony/France
- FAIST CONSTRUCTION SRL, Timișoara/Rumania

== See also ==
- Noise control
- Aeroacoustics
- Powder coating
