= Wiesenbach, Bavaria =

Wiesenbach
- Municipality
- Coat of arms

- Location of Wiesenbach within Günzburg district
- Interactive map of Wiesenbach
- Location within Germany Location within Bavaria
- Coordinates: 48°16′N 10°20′E
- Country: Germany
- State: Bavaria
- Admin. region: Schwaben
- District: Günzburg
- Municipal assoc.: Krumbach

Government
  - Mayor (2020–26): Gilbert Edelmann

Area
  - Total: 11.48 km^{2} (4.43 sq mi)
- Elevation: 500 m (1,600 ft)

Population (2025-12-31)
  - Total: 1,022
  - Density: 89.02/km^{2} (230.6/sq mi)
- Time zone: UTC+01:00 (CET)
  - Summer (DST): UTC+02:00 (CEST)
- Postal codes: 86519
- Dialling codes: 08283
- Vehicle registration: GZ
- Website: www.wiesenbach.de

Wiesenbach (German pronunciation: [ˈviːzn̩bax]) is a municipality in the district of Günzburg in Bavaria in Germany.
