= Haldenwang =

- Municipality
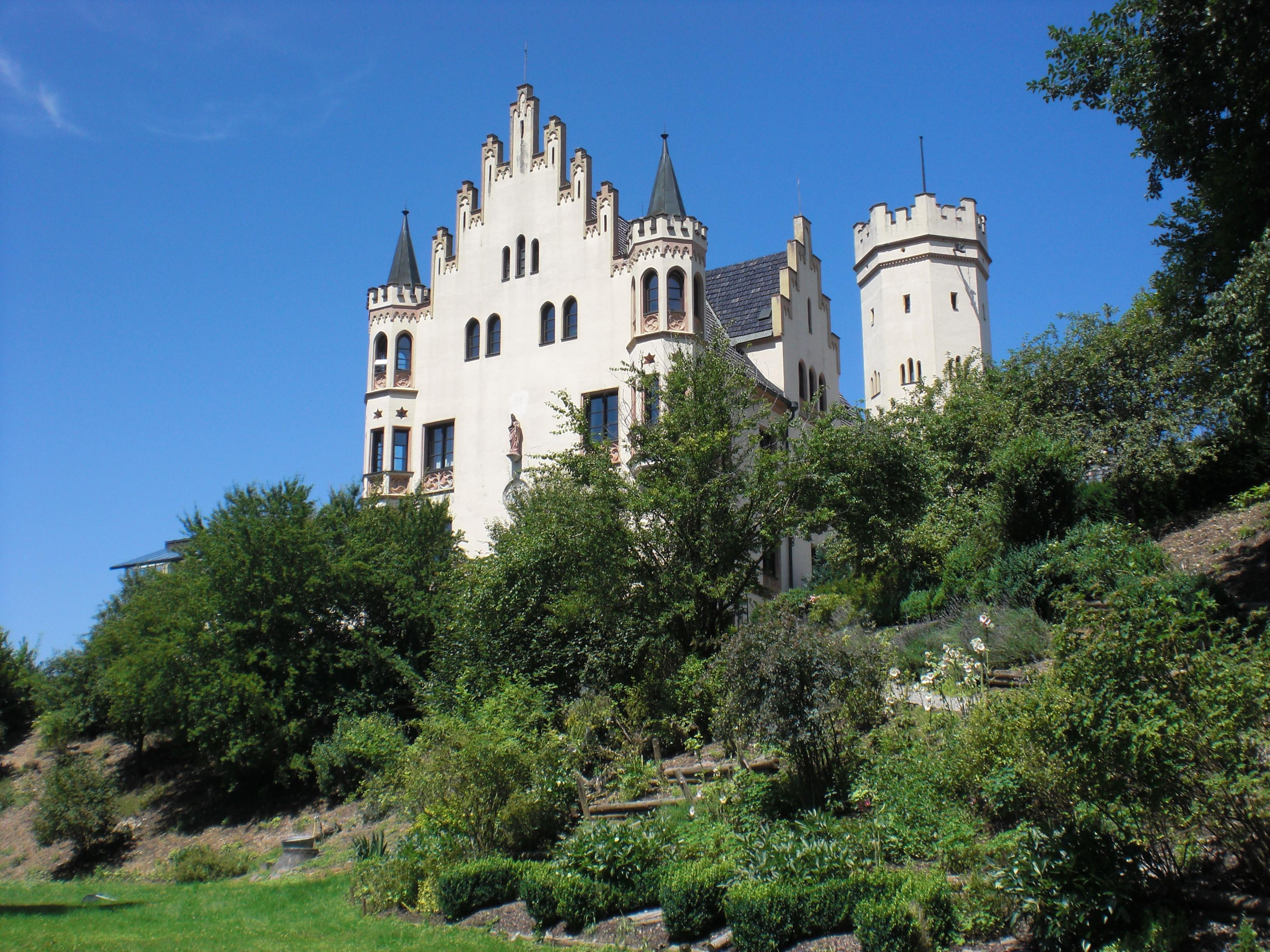
- Haldenwang Castle

- Coat of arms

- Location of Haldenwang within Günzburg district
- Interactive map of Haldenwang
- Location within Germany Location within Bavaria
- Coordinates: 48°28′N 10°26′E
- Country: Germany
- State: Bavaria
- Admin. region: Schwaben
- District: Günzburg
- Municipal assoc.: Haldenwang

Government
  - Mayor (2020–26): Doris Egger

Area
  - Total: 17.99 km^{2} (6.95 sq mi)
- Elevation: 480 m (1,570 ft)

Population (2025-12-31)
  - Total: 2,127
  - Density: 118.2/km^{2} (306.2/sq mi)
- Time zone: UTC+01:00 (CET)
  - Summer (DST): UTC+02:00 (CEST)
- Postal codes: 89356
- Dialling codes: 08222
- Vehicle registration: GZ
- Website: https://www.haldenwang-hw.de/

Haldenwang (German pronunciation: [ˈhaldn̩vaŋ]) is a municipality in the district of Günzburg in Bavaria in Germany.
