= Franz Tausend =

German alchemist

Franz Seraph Tausend, "Der Goldmacher" (July 5, 1884 – July 9, 1942) was a 20th-century German alchemist, who was able to raise significant funding from senior Nazi Party figures for his project. He was arrested in 1929 and convicted of misappropriation, serving a prison sentence. He died in prison in 1942, while serving a sentence for a separate crime.

== Biography ==
During the 1920s and 1930s, Tausend said he had developed a process for extracting gold from base metals, a prospect of interest to the Nazi Party, which was desperate for funding in a Germany struggling with hyperinflation. The Nazis invested heavily in the project, through a number of Hitler's inner circle of friends introduced to Tausend.

Tausend, who had liquidated and invested his family's entire fortune into the venture, raised approximately half a million dollars (roughly $5.6 million in 2005 dollars) to fund five laboratories, one research institute and one mining operation. However, the process proved to be economically unfeasible and possibly fraudulent, and most of the money went instead to fund the extravagant lifestyles of the four main business partners. Many investors, including pensioners in Tausend's home village, lost their entire savings, while he purchased castles and country homes.

Tausend's three partners fled Germany: one each to South America, Spain and Russia. Tausend fled to a castle he had purchased in his wife's name in Appiano, South Tyrol. In January 1929, after being involved in a car accident, he was recognized by Italian authorities, arrested and extradited to Germany to face trial for conspiracy to commit fraud.

Following a highly sensationalized trial that required Tausend to demonstrate his gold-extraction process first hand, he was convicted and sentenced to prison, not because the process itself was proven to be fraudulent, but because of the misappropriation of venture capital invested in the project. Tausend's remaining property was confiscated by the German state.

Upon his release from prison after serving a four-year sentence, Tausend began promoting his next "get-rich-quick" scheme. He was arrested again in 1937 and sentenced to prison in 1938 for check and money fraud. He died in prison at Schwäbisch Hall on July 9, 1942.

== Literature ==
- Wegener, Franz: Der Alchemist Franz Tausend. Alchemie und Nationalsozialismus. Kulturförderverein Ruhrgebiet e.V., Gladbeck 03/2006, ISBN 3-931300-18-8.

== Books ==
180 Elemente, deren Atomgewichte und Eingliederung in das harmonisch periodische System by Franz Tausend
