= Westliche Günz =

River in Germany

Location
- Country: Germany
- State: Bavaria

Physical characteristics
- Mouth
  - location: Günz
  - coordinates: 48.0654°N 10.3015°E
- Length: 31.9 km (19.8 mi)
- Basin size: 204 km^{2} (79 sq mi)

Basin features
- Progression: Günz→ Danube→ Black Sea

Westliche Günz is a river of Bavaria, Germany. At its confluence with the Östliche Günz near Lauben, the Günz is formed.

== See also ==
- List of rivers of Bavaria
