= Aichen =

- Municipality
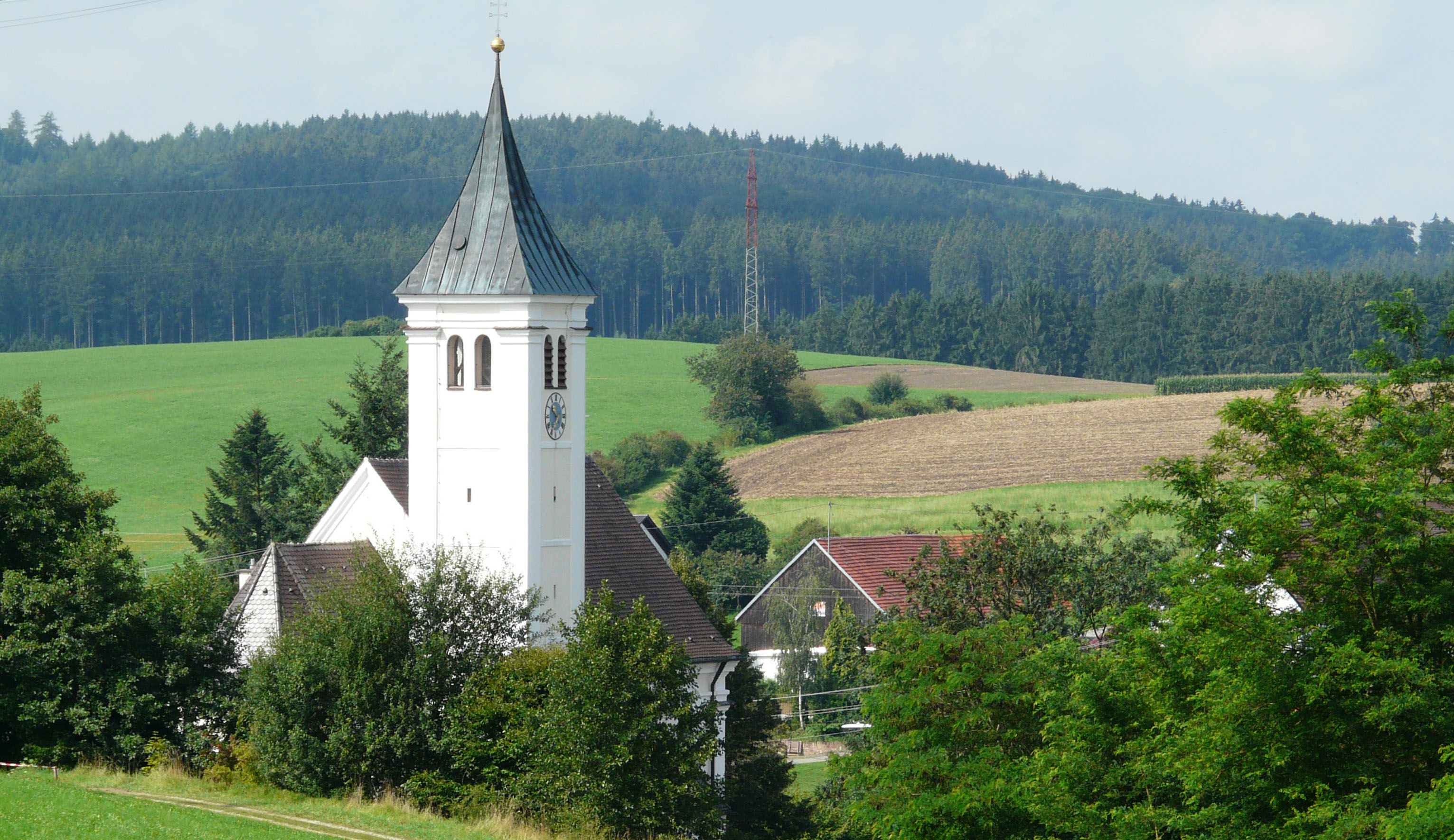
- Church in Aichen

- Coat of arms

- Location of Aichen within Günzburg district
- Interactive map of Aichen
- Location within Germany Location within Bavaria
- Coordinates: 48°14′N 10°33′E
- Country: Germany
- State: Bavaria
- Admin. region: Schwaben
- District: Günzburg
- Municipal assoc.: Ziemetshausen
- Subdivisions: 3 Ortsteile

Government
  - Mayor (2020–26): Alois Kling

Area
  - Total: 17.62 km^{2} (6.80 sq mi)
- Elevation: 510 m (1,670 ft)

Population (2025-12-31)
  - Total: 1,180
  - Density: 67.0/km^{2} (173/sq mi)
- Time zone: UTC+01:00 (CET)
  - Summer (DST): UTC+02:00 (CEST)
- Postal codes: 86479
- Dialling codes: 08284
- Vehicle registration: GZ

Aichen (German pronunciation: [ˈaɪçn̩]) is a municipality in the district of Günzburg in Bavaria in Germany.
