= Ellzee =

- Municipality
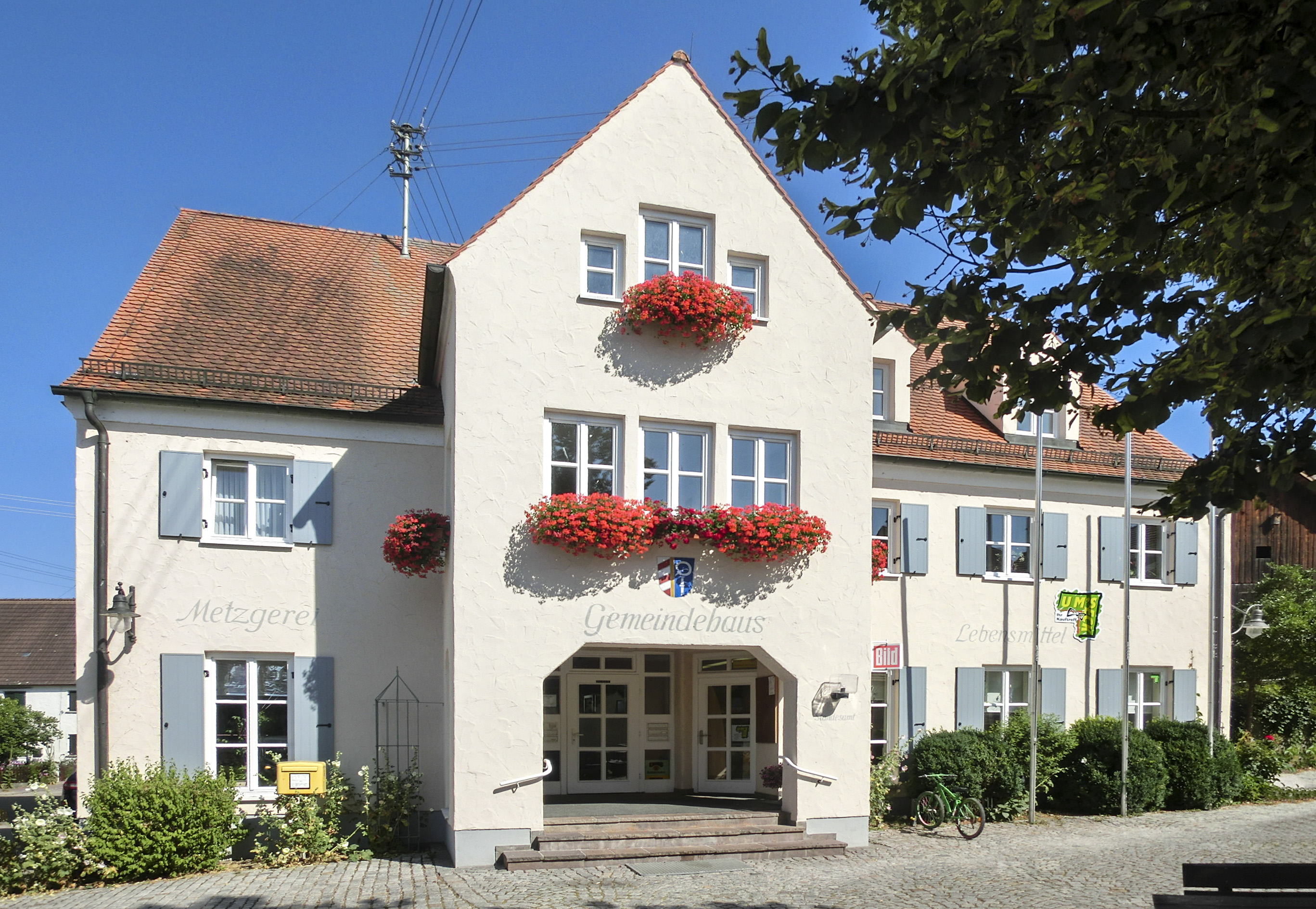
- Municipal office

- Coat of arms

- Location of Ellzee within Günzburg district
- Interactive map of Ellzee
- Location within Germany Location within Bavaria
- Coordinates: 48°20′N 10°19′E
- Country: Germany
- State: Bavaria
- Admin. region: Schwaben
- District: Günzburg
- Municipal assoc.: Ichenhausen

Government
  - Mayor (2020–26): Gabriela Schmucker

Area
  - Total: 14.77 km^{2} (5.70 sq mi)
- Elevation: 481–499 m (1,578–1,637 ft)

Population (2025-12-31)
  - Total: 1,258
  - Density: 85.17/km^{2} (220.6/sq mi)
- Time zone: UTC+01:00 (CET)
  - Summer (DST): UTC+02:00 (CEST)
- Postal codes: 89352
- Dialling codes: 08283
- Vehicle registration: GZ
- Website: www.gemeinde-ellzee.de

Ellzee (German pronunciation: [ˈɛltseː]) is a municipality in the district of Günzburg in Bavaria in Germany.
