= Thannhausen =

- Town
- Coat of arms

- Location of Thannhausen within Günzburg district
- Interactive map of Thannhausen
- Location within Germany Location within Bavaria
- Coordinates: 48°16′N 10°28′E
- Country: Germany
- State: Bavaria
- Admin. region: Schwaben
- District: Günzburg
- Municipal assoc.: Thannhausen

Government
  - Mayor (2020–26): Alois Held

Area
  - Total: 20.03 km^{2} (7.73 sq mi)
- Elevation: 499 m (1,637 ft)

Population (2025-12-31)
  - Total: 6,424
  - Density: 320.7/km^{2} (830.7/sq mi)
- Time zone: UTC+01:00 (CET)
  - Summer (DST): UTC+02:00 (CEST)
- Postal codes: 86470
- Dialling codes: 08281
- Vehicle registration: GZ
- Website: www.thannhausen.de

Thannhausen (German: [tanˈhaʊzn̩]) is a town in the district of Günzburg, in Bavaria, Germany. It is situated on the river Mindel, 24 kilometres (15 mi) southeast of Günzburg, and 33 kilometres (21 mi) west of Augsburg.

== History ==
This Thannhausen was part of the Lordship of Thannhausen that the Lords of Thannhausen ruled until the Austrian branch died out to which the House of Sinzendorf took control.

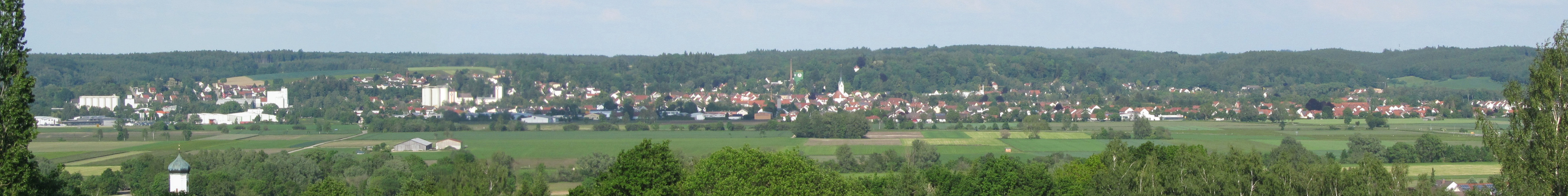
Panorama Picture from Thannhausen
