= Deisenhausen =

- Municipality
- Coat of arms

- Location of Deisenhausen within Günzburg district
- Interactive map of Deisenhausen
- Location within Germany Location within Bavaria
- Coordinates: 48°15′N 10°20′E
- Country: Germany
- State: Bavaria
- Admin. region: Schwaben
- District: Günzburg
- Municipal assoc.: Krumbach

Government
  - Mayor (2020–26): Bernd Langbauer

Area
  - Total: 11.67 km^{2} (4.51 sq mi)
- Elevation: 507 m (1,663 ft)

Population (2025-12-31)
  - Total: 1,436
  - Density: 123.1/km^{2} (318.7/sq mi)
- Time zone: UTC+01:00 (CET)
  - Summer (DST): UTC+02:00 (CEST)
- Postal codes: 86489
- Dialling codes: 08282
- Vehicle registration: GZ, KRU
- Website: www.deisenhausen.de

Deisenhausen (German pronunciation: [daɪzn̩ˈhaʊzn̩]) is a municipality in the district of Günzburg in Bavaria in Germany.
