= Balzhausen =

- Municipality
- Coat of arms

- Location of Balzhausen within Günzburg district
- Interactive map of Balzhausen
- Location within Germany Location within Bavaria
- Coordinates: 48°14′N 10°30′E
- Country: Germany
- State: Bavaria
- Admin. region: Schwaben
- District: Günzburg
- Municipal assoc.: Thannhausen

Government
  - Mayor (2020–26): Daniel Mayer

Area
  - Total: 14.63 km^{2} (5.65 sq mi)
- Elevation: 516 m (1,693 ft)

Population (2025-12-31)
  - Total: 1,255
  - Density: 85.78/km^{2} (222.2/sq mi)
- Time zone: UTC+01:00 (CET)
  - Summer (DST): UTC+02:00 (CEST)
- Postal codes: 86483
- Dialling codes: 08281
- Vehicle registration: GZ
- Website: www.balzhausen.de

Balzhausen (German pronunciation: [baltsˈhaʊzn̩]) is a municipality in the district of Günzburg in Bavaria in Germany.

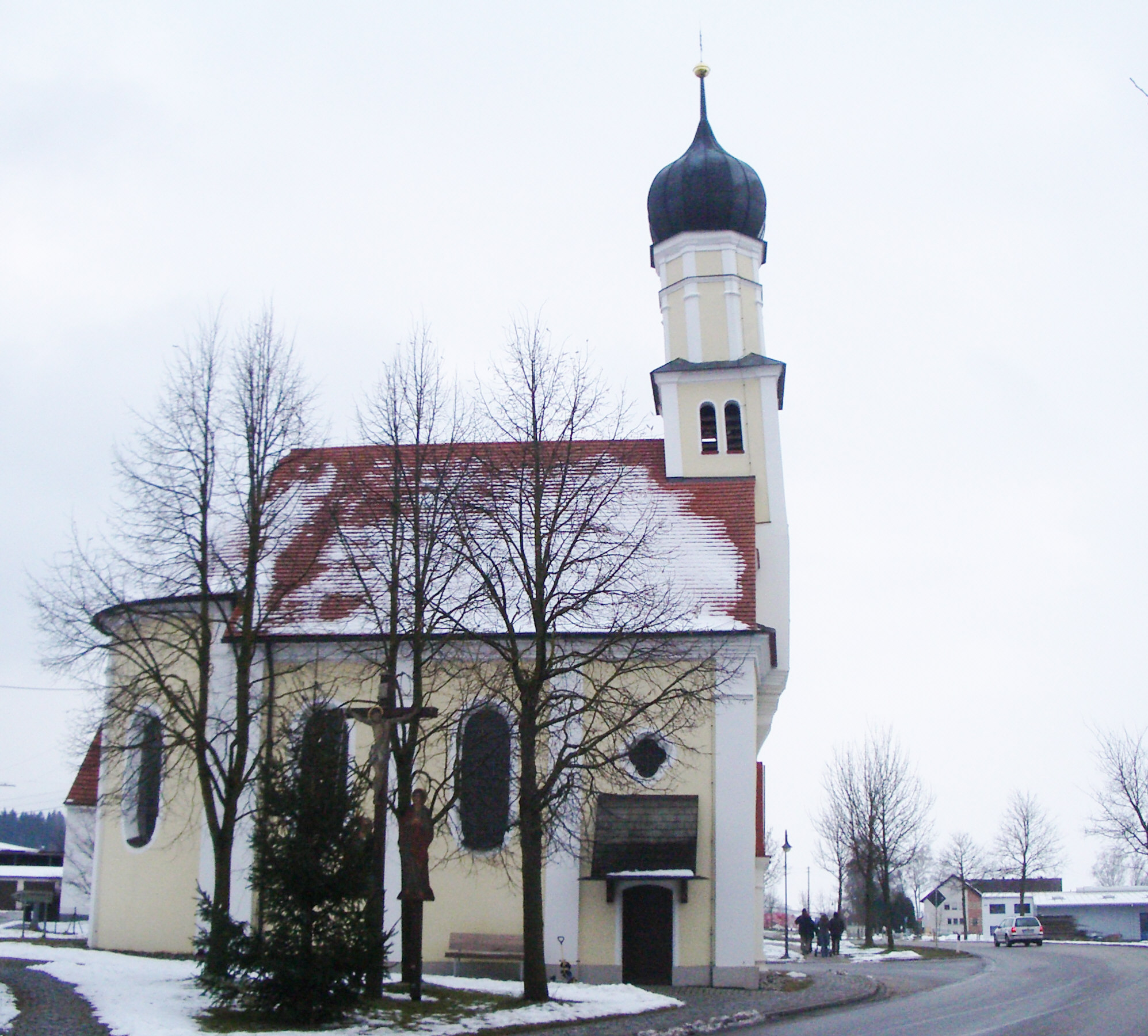
Balzhausen Leonhardskapelle
