= Ursberg =

- Municipality
- Coat of arms

- Location of Ursberg within Günzburg district
- Interactive map of Ursberg
- Location within Germany Location within Bavaria
- Coordinates: 48°16′N 10°27′E
- Country: Germany
- State: Bavaria
- Admin. region: Schwaben
- District: Günzburg

Government
  - Mayor (2020–26): Peter Walburger

Area
  - Total: 25.4 km^{2} (9.8 sq mi)
- Elevation: 508 m (1,667 ft)

Population (2025-12-31)
  - Total: 3,199
  - Density: 126/km^{2} (326/sq mi)
- Time zone: UTC+01:00 (CET)
  - Summer (DST): UTC+02:00 (CEST)
- Postal codes: 86513
- Dialling codes: 08281
- Vehicle registration: GZ
- Website: www.ursberg.de

Ursberg (German pronunciation: [ˈʊʁsbɛʁk]) is a municipality in the district of Günzburg in Bavaria in Germany.

== Sightseeing ==
Nearby is Ursberg Abbey, a former Imperial Abbey of the Holy Roman Empire.

== Notable residents ==
- Theo Waigel, former Chairperson of the Christian Social Union of Bavaria party and Federal Minister of Finance of Germany.
