= Aletshausen =

- Municipality
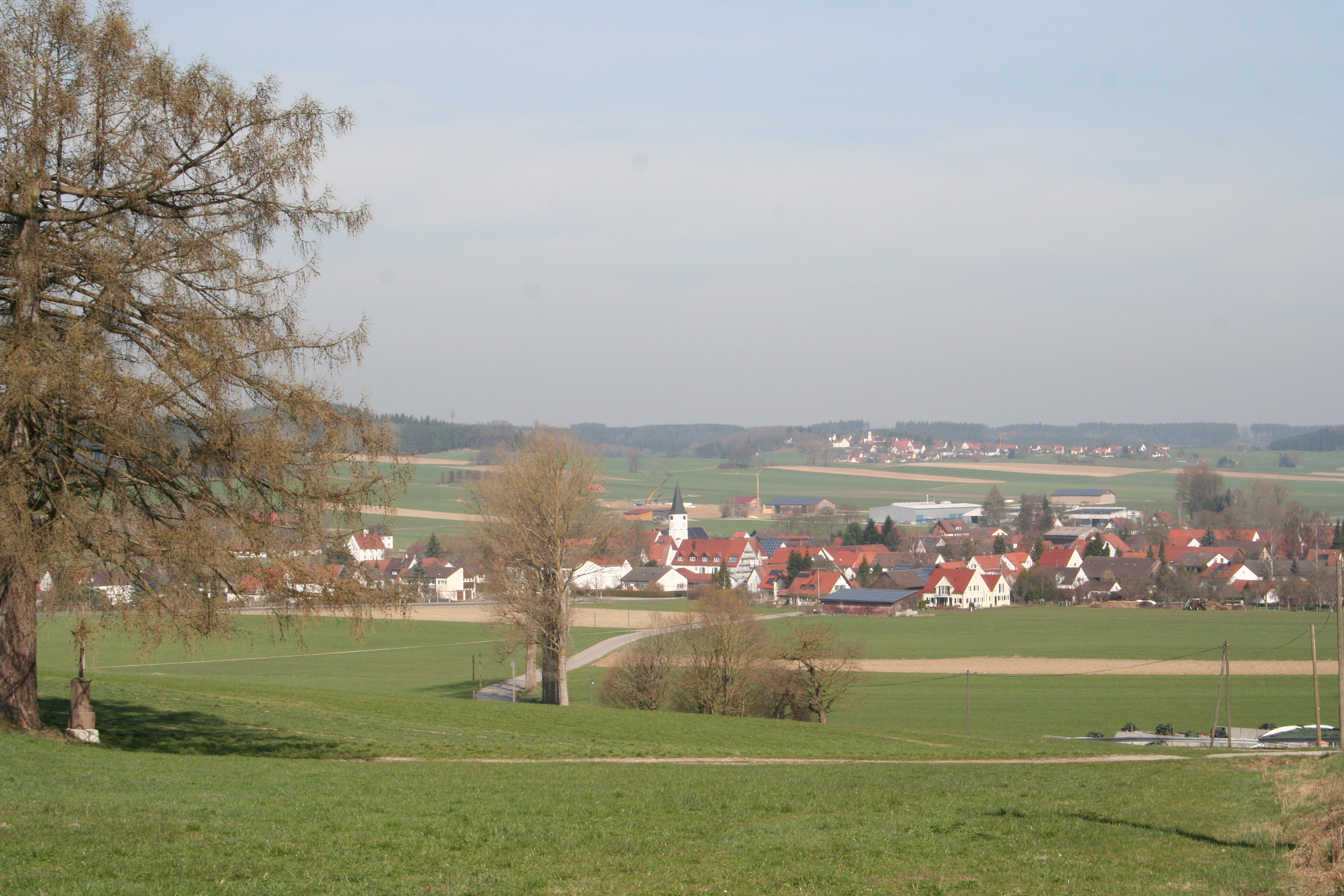
- Aletshausen

- Coat of arms

- Location of Aletshausen within Günzburg district
- Interactive map of Aletshausen
- Location within Germany Location within Bavaria
- Coordinates: 48°12′N 10°23′E
- Country: Germany
- State: Bavaria
- Admin. region: Schwaben
- District: Günzburg
- Municipal assoc.: Krumbach

Government
  - Mayor (2020–26): Georg Duscher

Area
  - Total: 17.66 km^{2} (6.82 sq mi)
- Elevation: 527 m (1,729 ft)

Population (2025-12-31)
  - Total: 1,217
  - Density: 68.91/km^{2} (178.5/sq mi)
- Time zone: UTC+01:00 (CET)
  - Summer (DST): UTC+02:00 (CEST)
- Postal codes: 86480
- Dialling codes: 08282
- Vehicle registration: GZ
- Website: www.aletshausen.de

Aletshausen is a municipality in the district of Günzburg in Bavaria in Germany.
