= Mindel (river) =

River in Germany

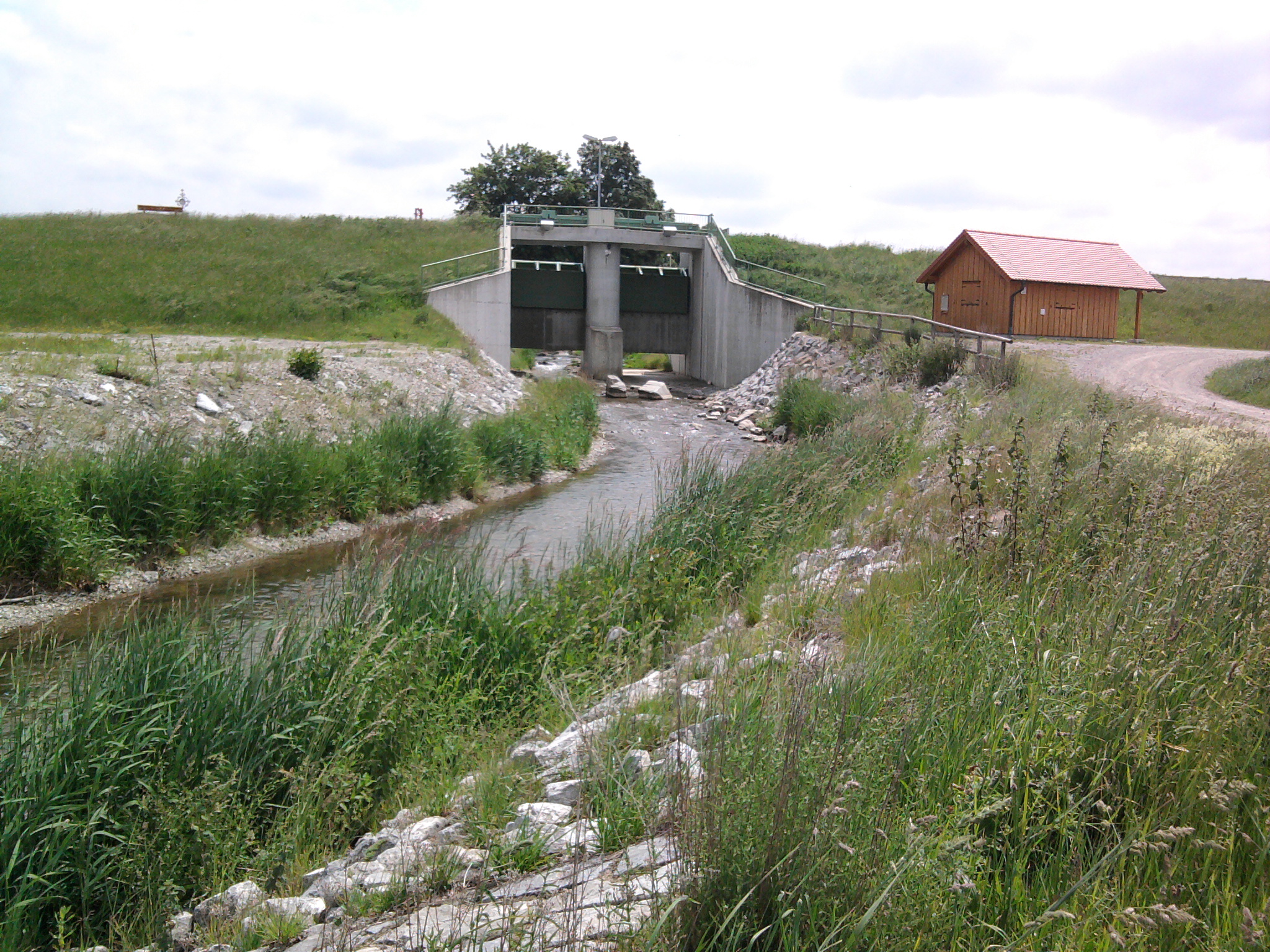
- The Mindel at the dam in Dirlewang

Location
- Country: Germany
- State: Bavaria
- Region: Swabia
- Reference no.: DE: 116

Physical characteristics
- Source
  - location: at the Mindelmühle near Ronsberg
  - coordinates: 47°53′53″N 10°26′24″E
  - elevation: ca. 760 m
- Mouth
  - location: near Gundremmingen into the Danube
  - coordinates: 48°30′26″N 10°23′14″E
  - elevation: ca. 430 m
- Length: 80.7 km (50.1 mi)
- Basin size: 962 km^{2} (371 sq mi)
- Discharge
  - average: 10 m³/s
  - maximum: Average high: 65 m³/s

Basin features
- Progression: Danube→ Black Sea
- Landmarks: Small towns: Mindelheim, Thannhausen, Burgau; Villages: Markt Obergünzburg, Markt Ronsberg, Eggenthal, Unteregg, Markt Dirlewang, Apfeltrach, Markt Pfaffenhausen, Salgen, Breitenbrunn, Markt Kirchheim in Schwaben, Aletshausen, Ursberg, Balzhausen, Markt Münsterhausen, Markt Neuburg an der Kammel, Markt Burtenbach, Markt Jettingen-Scheppach, Rettenbach, Dürrlauingen, Markt Offingen, Gundremmingen
- Tributaries
  - left: Kammel
  - right: Flossach

The Mindel (German: [ˈmɪndl]) is a river in Bavaria, southern Germany. The Mindel originates west of Kaufbeuren, in the Allgäu region, and flows generally north. It flows into the Danube (right tributary) in Gundremmingen, east of Günzburg. The towns Mindelheim, Burgau and Thannhausen lie along the Mindel.

The Mindel gave its name to the Mindel glaciation in the Alps.

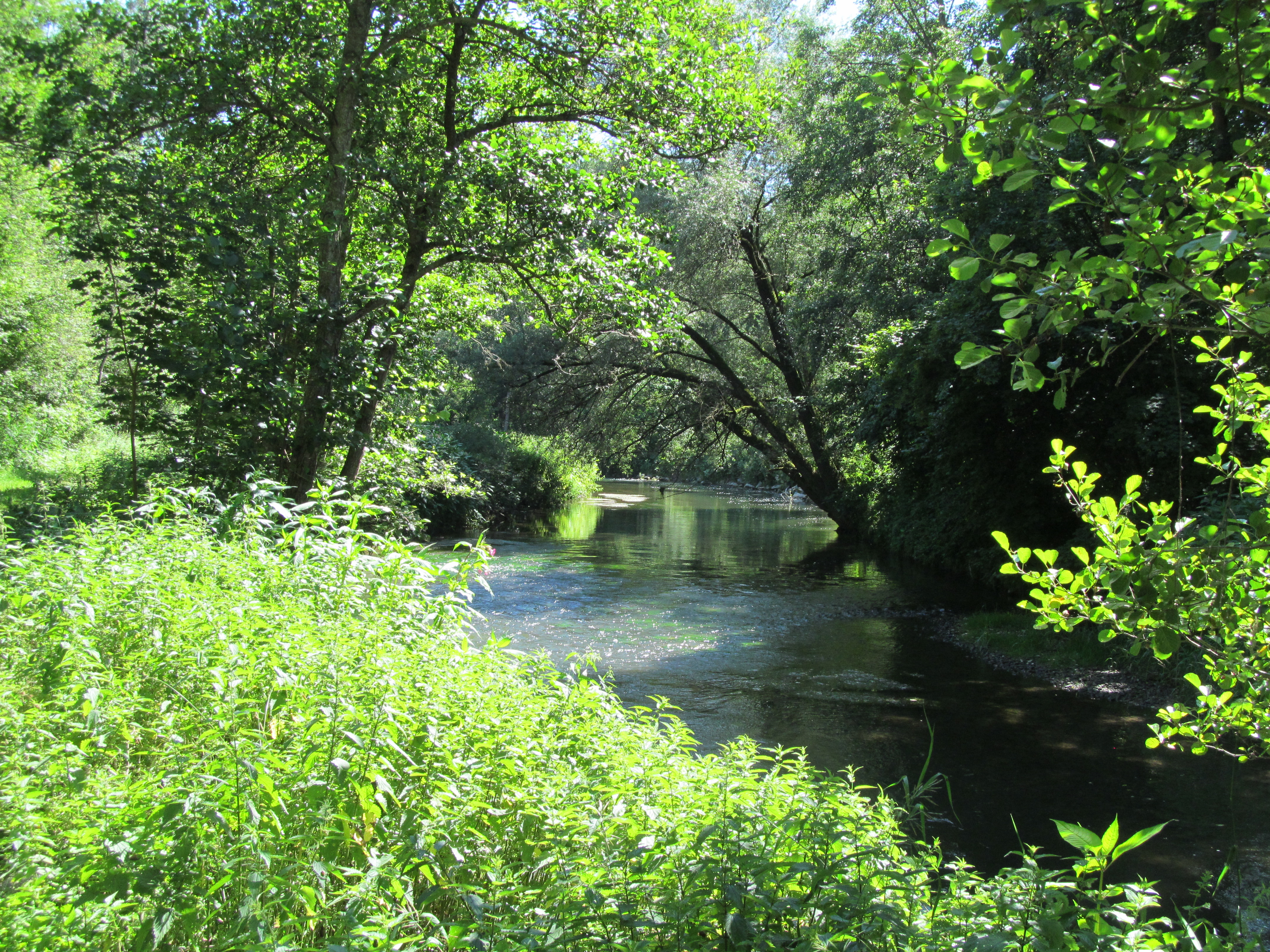
The Mindel near Balzhausen

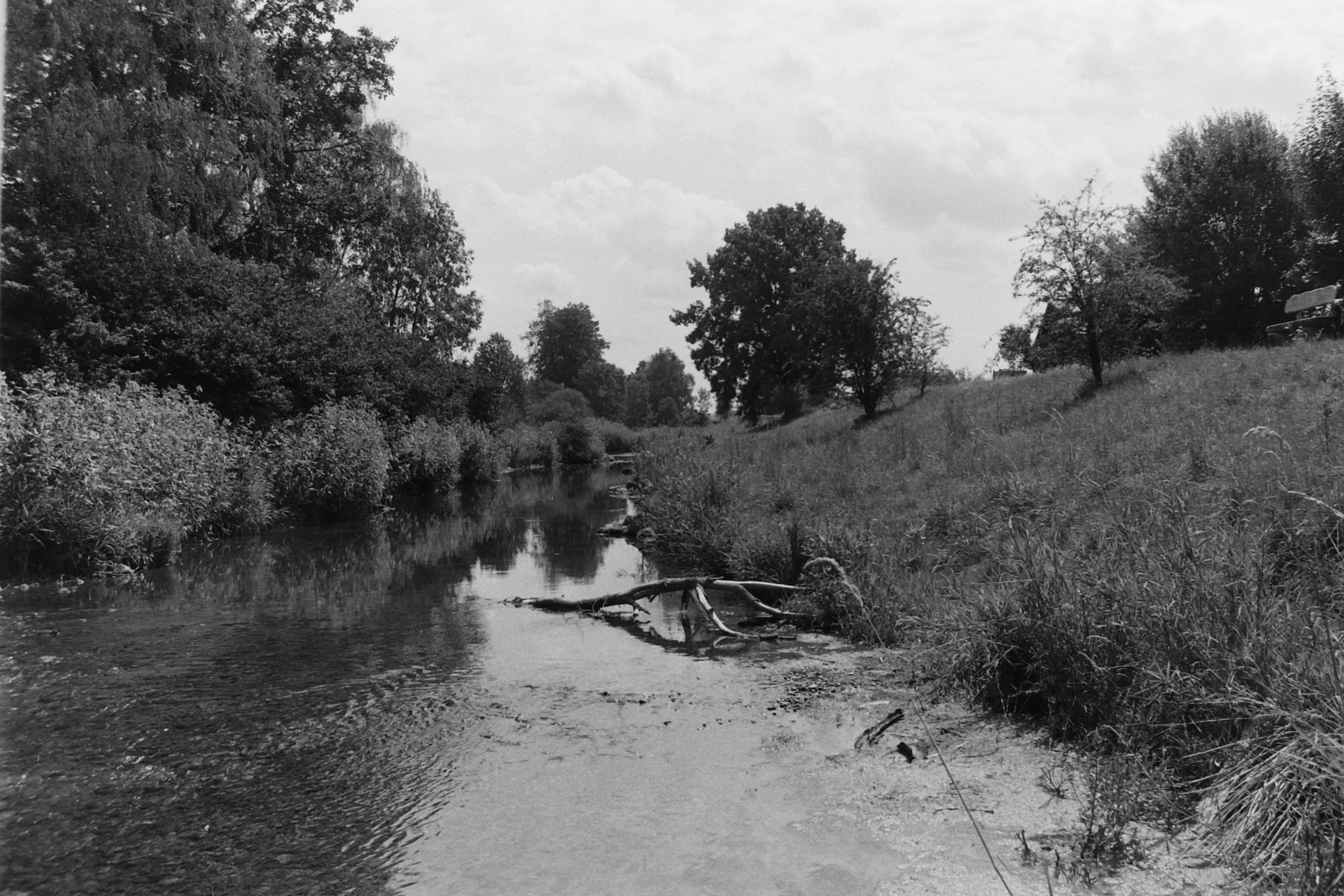
The Mindel near Pfaffenhausen

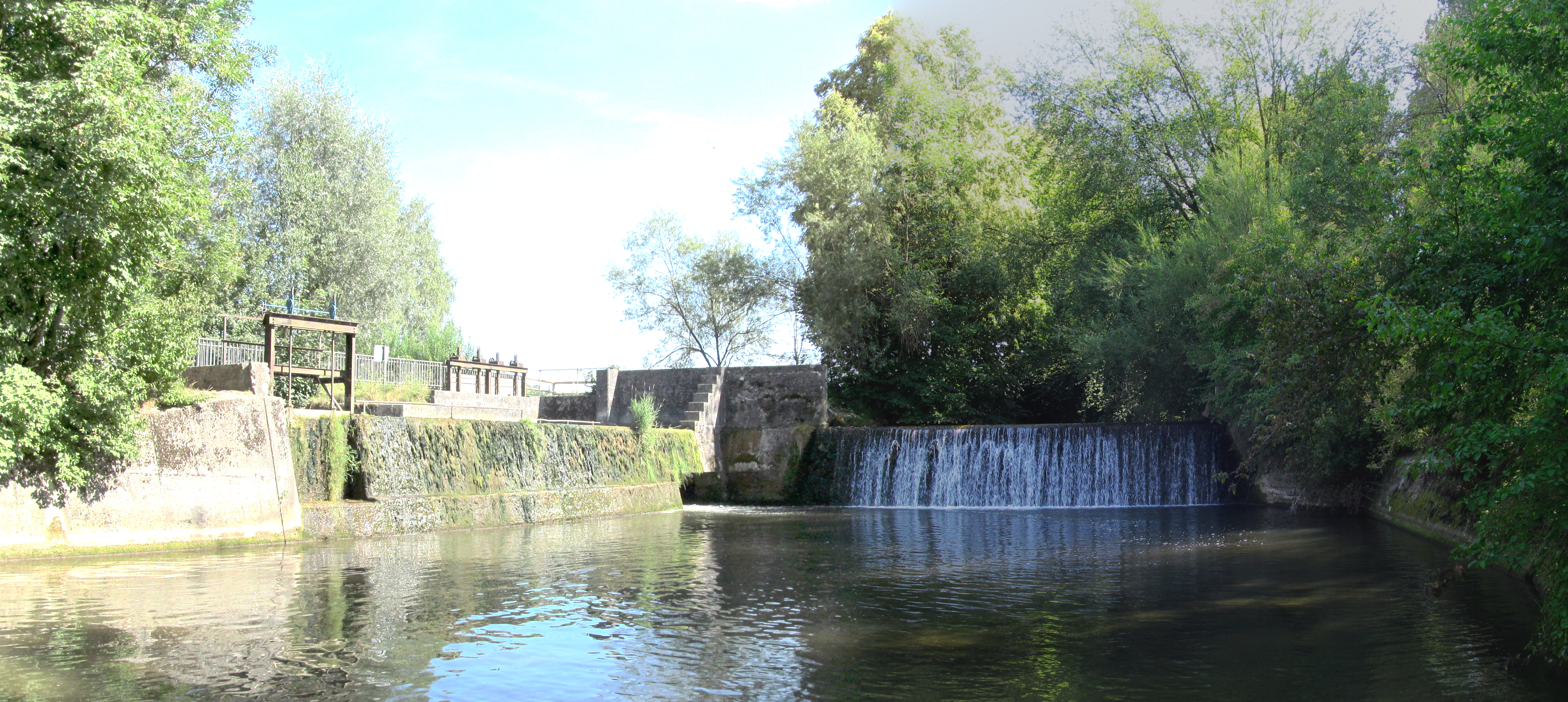
The weir near Thannhausen
