= Ebershausen =

- Municipality
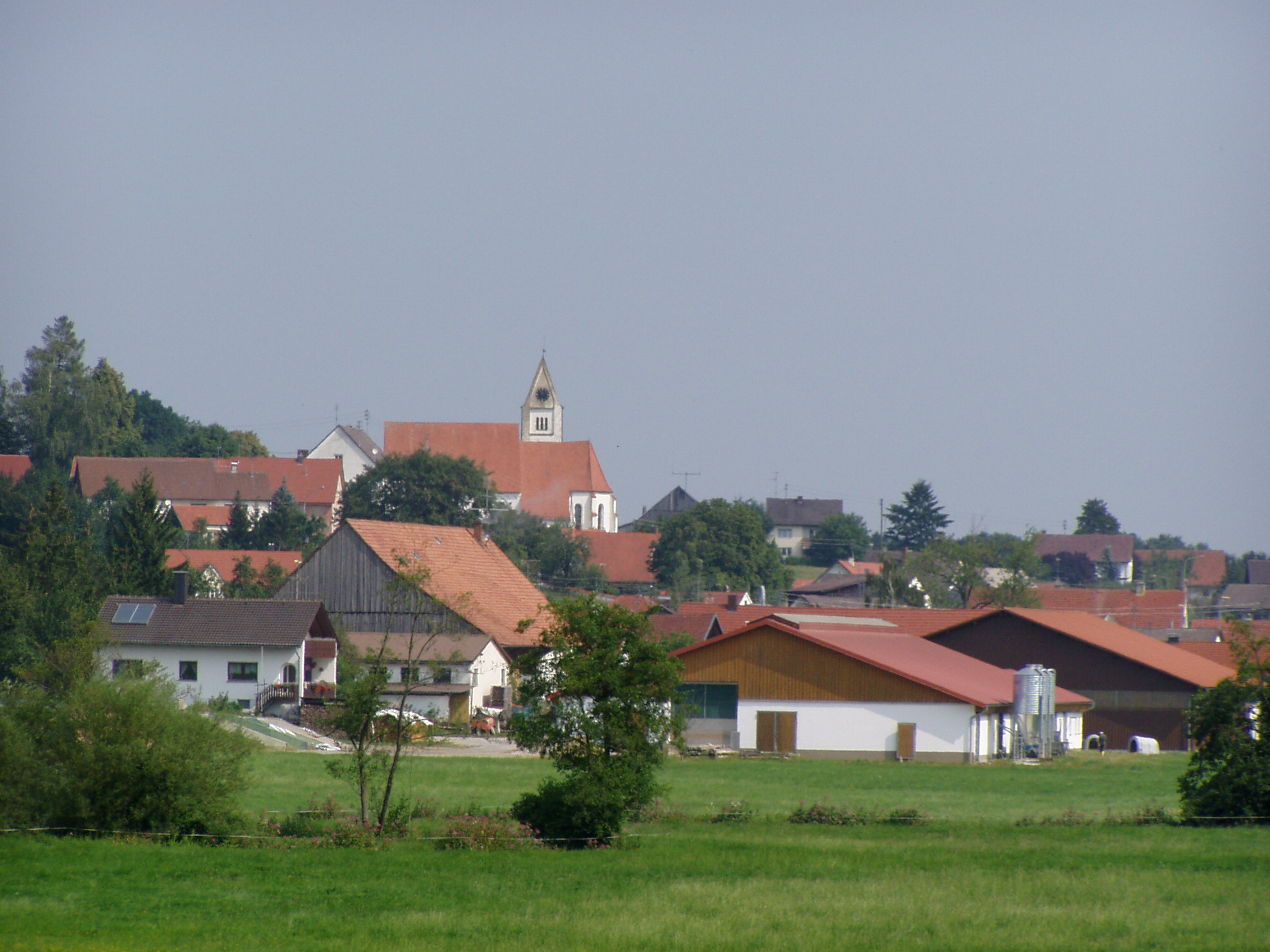
- Ebershausen seen from the south

- Coat of arms

- Location of Ebershausen within Günzburg district
- Interactive map of Ebershausen
- Location within Germany Location within Bavaria
- Coordinates: 48°12′N 10°19′E
- Country: Germany
- State: Bavaria
- Admin. region: Schwaben
- District: Günzburg
- Municipal assoc.: Krumbach

Government
  - Mayor (2020–26): Harald Lenz

Area
  - Total: 9.09 km^{2} (3.51 sq mi)
- Elevation: 541 m (1,775 ft)

Population (2025-12-31)
  - Total: 620
  - Density: 68/km^{2} (180/sq mi)
- Time zone: UTC+01:00 (CET)
  - Summer (DST): UTC+02:00 (CEST)
- Postal codes: 86491
- Dialling codes: 08282
- Vehicle registration: GZ

Ebershausen (German pronunciation: [eːbɐsˈhaʊzn̩]) is a municipality in the district of Günzburg in Bavaria in Germany.
