= Breitenthal =

- Municipality
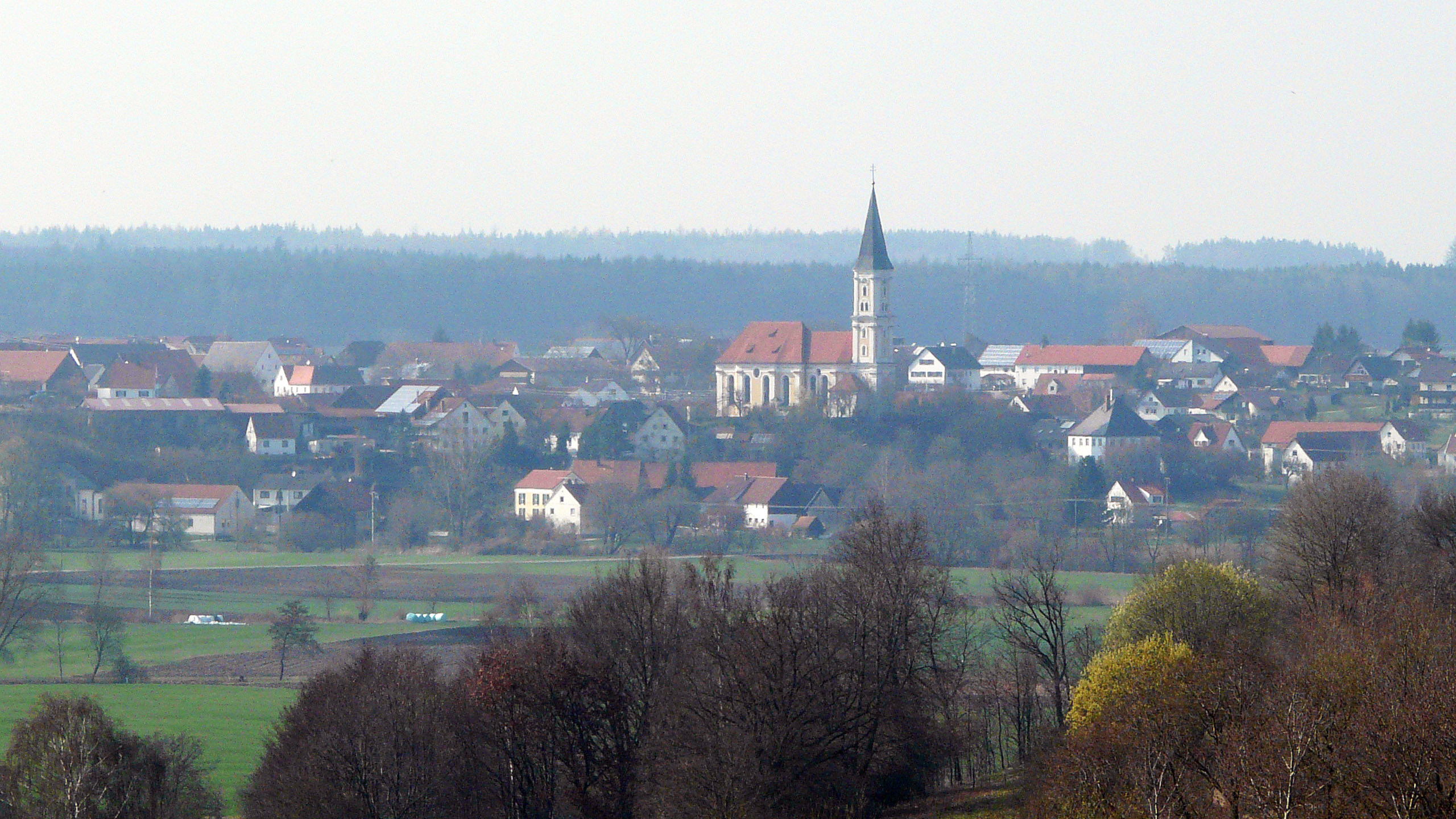

- Coat of arms

- Location of Breitenthal within Günzburg district
- Interactive map of Breitenthal
- Location within Germany Location within Bavaria
- Coordinates: 48°14′N 10°18′E
- Country: Germany
- State: Bavaria
- Admin. region: Schwaben
- District: Günzburg
- Municipal assoc.: Krumbach

Government
  - Mayor (2020–26): Gabriele Wohlhöfler

Area
  - Total: 13.27 km^{2} (5.12 sq mi)
- Elevation: 528 m (1,732 ft)

Population (2025-12-31)
  - Total: 1,258
  - Density: 94.80/km^{2} (245.5/sq mi)
- Time zone: UTC+01:00 (CET)
  - Summer (DST): UTC+02:00 (CEST)
- Postal codes: 86488
- Dialling codes: 08282
- Vehicle registration: GZ

Breitenthal (German pronunciation: [ˈbʁaɪtn̩taːl]) is a municipality in the district of Günzburg in Bavaria in Germany. The Oberrieder Weiher, a in the region Mittelschwaben popular greenbelt recreation area, is in the municipal area of Breitenthal.
