= Münsterhausen =

- Municipality
- Coat of arms

- Location of Münsterhausen within Günzburg district
- Interactive map of Münsterhausen
- Location within Germany Location within Bavaria
- Coordinates: 48°19′N 10°27′E
- Country: Germany
- State: Bavaria
- Admin. region: Schwaben
- District: Günzburg
- Municipal assoc.: Thannhausen

Government
  - Mayor (2020–26): Erwin Haider

Area
  - Total: 18.47 km^{2} (7.13 sq mi)
- Elevation: 492 m (1,614 ft)

Population (2025-12-31)
  - Total: 1,986
  - Density: 107.5/km^{2} (278.5/sq mi)
- Time zone: UTC+01:00 (CET)
  - Summer (DST): UTC+02:00 (CEST)
- Postal codes: 86505
- Dialling codes: 08281
- Vehicle registration: GZ

Münsterhausen (German pronunciation: [mʏnstɐˈhaʊzn̩]) is a municipality in the district of Günzburg in Bavaria in Germany.
