= Günzburg (district) =

Coordinates: 48°20′N 10°20′E

- District
- Flag Coat of arms
- Country: Germany
- State: Bavaria
- Adm. region: Swabia
- Capital: Günzburg

Government
  - District admin.: Hans Reichhart (CSU)

Area
  - Total: 763 km^{2} (295 sq mi)

Population (31 December 2025)
  - Total: 129,580
  - Density: 170/km^{2} (440/sq mi)
- Time zone: UTC+01:00 (CET)
  - Summer (DST): UTC+02:00 (CEST)
- Vehicle registration: GZ, KRU
- Website: landkreis-guenzburg.de

Günzburg is a Landkreis (district) in Swabia, Bavaria, Germany. Its capital is the town Günzburg. It is bounded by (from the north and clockwise) the districts of Dillingen, Augsburg, Unterallgäu and Neu-Ulm, and by the state of Baden-Württemberg (districts Alb-Donau and Heidenheim).

== History ==
In the early Middle Ages the tiny county of Burgau ruled the region. In 1213 the county was acquired by the lords of Berg; it was then known as Berg-Burgau, but the last ruler of this collateral line died in 1301, and Burgau (now raised to the level of a margraviate) became an exclave of Austria. In the early 17th century the administrative seat was moved from the town of Burgau to Günzburg, but the margraviate retained its name. When the Holy Roman Empire ceased to exist in 1806, the margraviate was dissolved and the region was annexed by Bavaria.

The district was established in 1972 by merging the former districts of Günzburg and Krumbach. Günzburg lost its status as an urban district and became the administrative seat of the new district.

== Geography ==
The Danube river and its tributaries characterise this district. The Danube runs through the northernmost parts of the district, passing the cities of Günzburg and Leipheim. There are several affluents coming from the south, for example Biber, Günz and Mindel. Most of the district's area is covered with forests; the eastern third of the territory is part of the Augsburg Western Forests Nature Park.

== Coat of arms ==
On the right there are the old arms of the margravate of Burgau: red and white with a yellow beam. The eagle is from the arms of the Schwabegg-Ursberg family, which founded two monasteries in the district.

== Towns and municipalities ==
Clickable map of towns and municipalities in the district

Towns
1. Burgau
2. Günzburg
3. Krumbach
4. Leipheim
Märkte
1. Burtenbach
2. Jettingen-Scheppach
3. Neuburg an der Kammel
Municipalities
1. Bibertal
2. Kammeltal
3. Ursberg

Verwaltungsgemeinschaften
1. Haldenwang; 1. Dürrlauingen; 2. Haldenwang^{1}; 3. Landensberg; 4. Röfingen; 5. Winterbach	2. Ichenhausen; 1. Ellzee; 2. Ichenhausen^{1,2}; 3. Waldstetten^{3}; 3. Kötz; 1. Bubesheim; 2. Kötz^{1}	4. Krumbach; 1. Aletshausen; 2. Breitenthal; 3. Deisenhausen; 4. Ebershausen; 5. Waltenhausen; 6. Wiesenbach	5. Offingen; 1. Gundremmingen; 2. Offingen^{1,3}; 3. Rettenbach	6. Thannhausen; 1. Balzhausen; 2. Münsterhausen^{3}; 3. Thannhausen^{1,2}; 7. Ziemetshausen; 1. Aichen; 2. Ziemetshausen^{1,3}
^{1}seat of the Verwaltungsgemeinschaft; ^{2}town; ^{3}Markt
