= Günz =

River in Germany

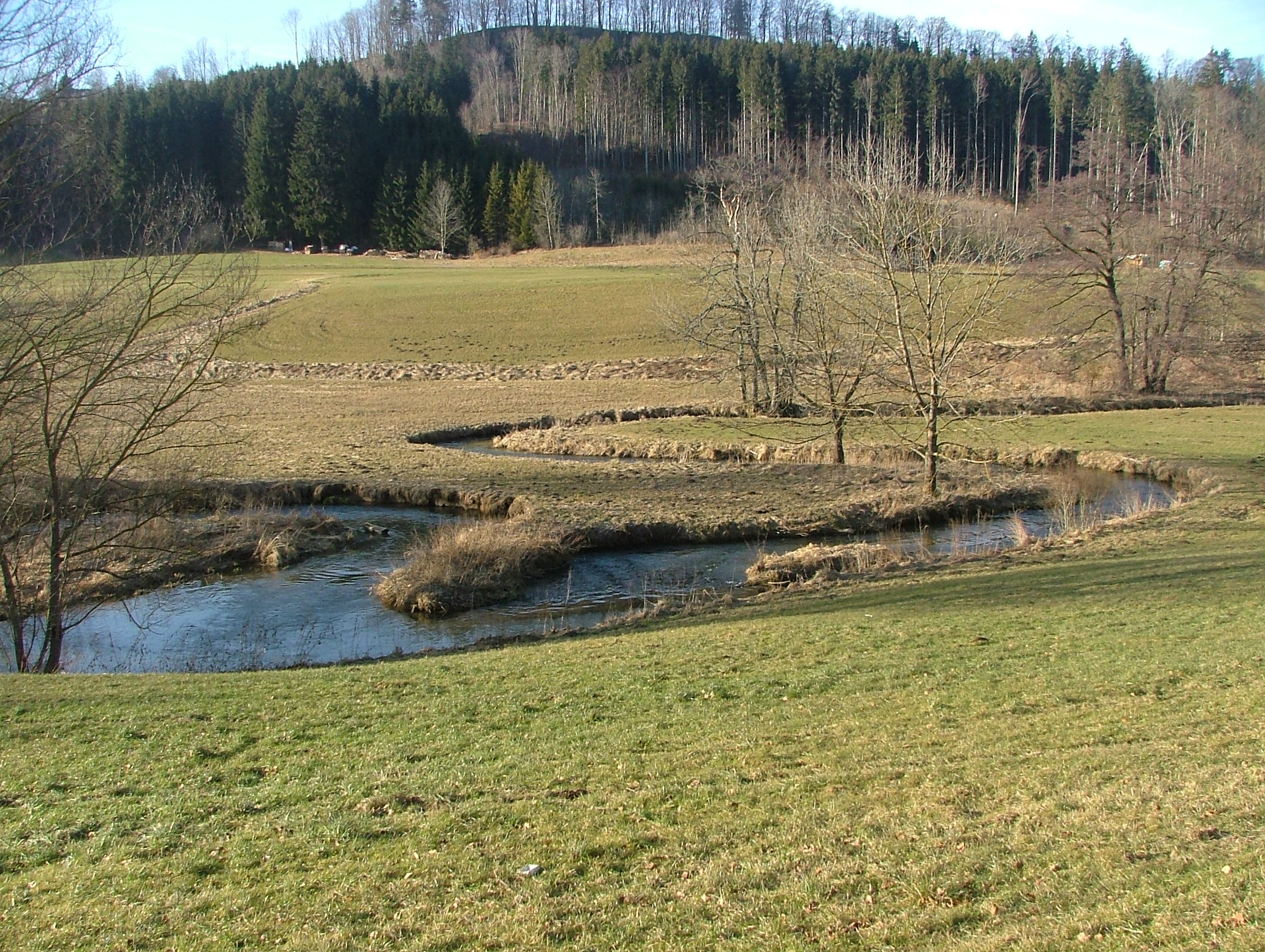
- Meander of the Eastern Günz south of Ronsberg

Location
- Country: Germany

Physical characteristics
- Source
  - location: Swabia
- Mouth
  - location: Danube
  - coordinates: 48°27′44″N 10°16′31″E
- Length: 86.8 km (53.9 mi)
- Basin size: 713 km^{2} (275 sq mi)

Basin features
- Progression: Danube→ Black Sea

The Günz (German pronunciation: [ɡʏnts]) is a river in Bavaria, Germany.

It is formed near Lauben by the confluence of its two source rivers: the Östliche Günz (eastern Günz) and the Westliche Günz (western Günz). It is approx. 87 km (54 mi) long (including its western source river). It flows generally north through the small towns Babenhausen, Deisenhausen, Ichenhausen and Kötz. It is a right tributary of the Danube in Günzburg.

== See also ==
- List of rivers of Bavaria
