= Jettingen station =

Railway station in Germany

Jettingen
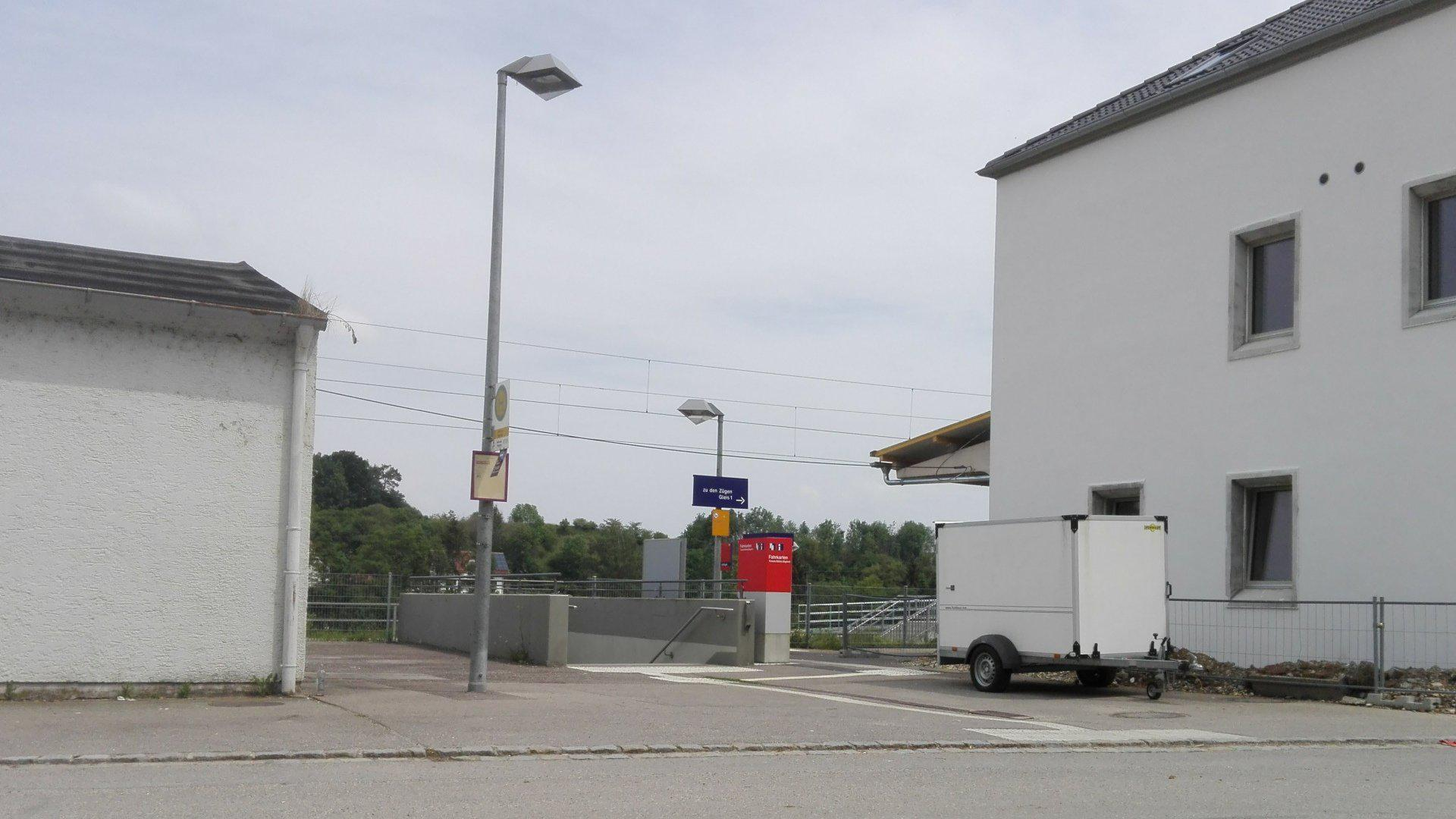
- View of the station building from the forecourt

General information
- Location: Jettingen-Scheppach, Bavaria; Germany
- Coordinates: 48°23′57″N 10°26′44″E
- Owner: DB Netz
- Operator: DB Station&Service
- Lines: Ulm–Augsburg line (KBS 980)
- Platforms: 2 side platforms
- Tracks: 2
- Train operators: Go-Ahead Bayern
- Connections: RE 9

Other information
- Station code: 3053
- DS100 code: MJET
- IBNR: 8003123
- Category: 6
- Fare zone: 233 (VVM)
- Website: stationsdatenbank.de; www.bahnhof.de

Services
Preceding station		Following station
Burgau (Schwab) towards Ulm Hbf	RE 9	Freihalden towards München Hbf
Location
- Location within Bavaria Location within Germany Location within Europe

Jettingen station (German: Haltepunkt Jettingen) is a railway stop in the market municipality of Jettingen-Scheppach, in Bavaria, Germany. The train station is located in the district of Jettingen and on the standard gauge railroad line Ulm-Augsburg of Deutsche Bahn.

== Services ==
As of the December 2020 timetable change, the following services stop at Jettingen:

- RE 9: Hourly service between Ulm Hauptbahnhof and München Hauptbahnhof
