= Mindelaltheim station =

Railway station in Germany

Mindelaltheim
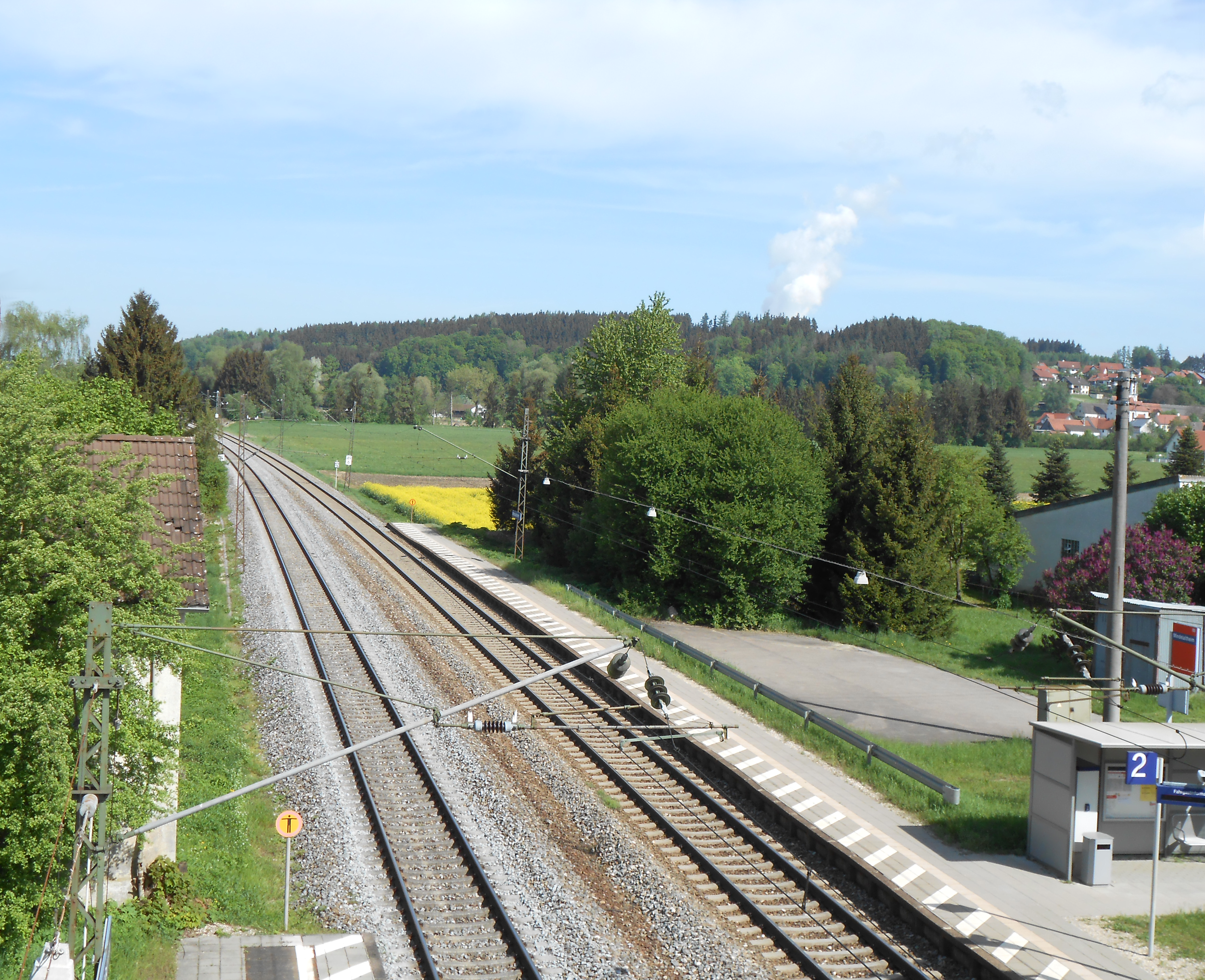
- The station platforms in 2015

General information
- Location: Dürrlauingen, Bavaria; Germany
- Coordinates: 48°27′22″N 10°24′28″E
- Owner: DB Netz
- Lines: Ulm–Augsburg line (KBS 980)
- Distance: 49.4 km (30.7 mi) from Augsburg Hauptbahnhof
- Platforms: 2 side platforms
- Tracks: 2
- Train operators: Go-Ahead Bayern
- Connections: Bus lines

Other information
- Station code: 4118
- DS100 code: MMAH
- IBNR: 8004030
- Category: 6
- Fare zone: 221 (VVM)

Services
Preceding station		Following station
Offingen towards Ulm Hbf	RE 9	Burgau (Schwab) towards München Hbf
Location

Mindelaltheim station (German: Bahnhof Mindelaltheim), is a railway station in the municipality of Dürrlauingen, in Bavaria, Germany. It is located on the standard gauge Ulm–Augsburg line of Deutsche Bahn.

== Services ==
As of the December 2020 timetable change, the following services stop at Mindelaltheim:

- RE: hourly service between Ulm Hauptbahnhof and München Hauptbahnhof.
