= Dürrlauingen =

- Municipality
- Coat of arms

- Location of Dürrlauingen within Günzburg district
- Interactive map of Dürrlauingen
- Location within Germany Location within Bavaria
- Coordinates: 48°28′N 10°26′E
- Country: Germany
- State: Bavaria
- Admin. region: Schwaben
- District: Günzburg
- Municipal assoc.: Haldenwang

Government
  - Mayor (2020–26): Friedrich Bobinger (FW)

Area
  - Total: 12.34 km^{2} (4.76 sq mi)
- Elevation: 503 m (1,650 ft)

Population (2025-12-31)
  - Total: 1,491
  - Density: 120.8/km^{2} (312.9/sq mi)
- Time zone: UTC+01:00 (CET)
  - Summer (DST): UTC+02:00 (CEST)
- Postal codes: 89350
- Dialling codes: 08222
- Vehicle registration: GZ
- Website: www.duerrlauingen.de

Dürrlauingen is a municipality in the district of Günzburg in Bavaria in Germany.

== Transport ==
The municipality has a railway station, Mindelaltheim, on the Ulm–Augsburg line.
