= Philippine Welser =

Morganatic wife of the Archduke of Austria

- Baroness of Zinnenburg, Margravine of Burgau, Landgravine of Mellenburg, Countess of Oberhohenberg and Niederhohenberg
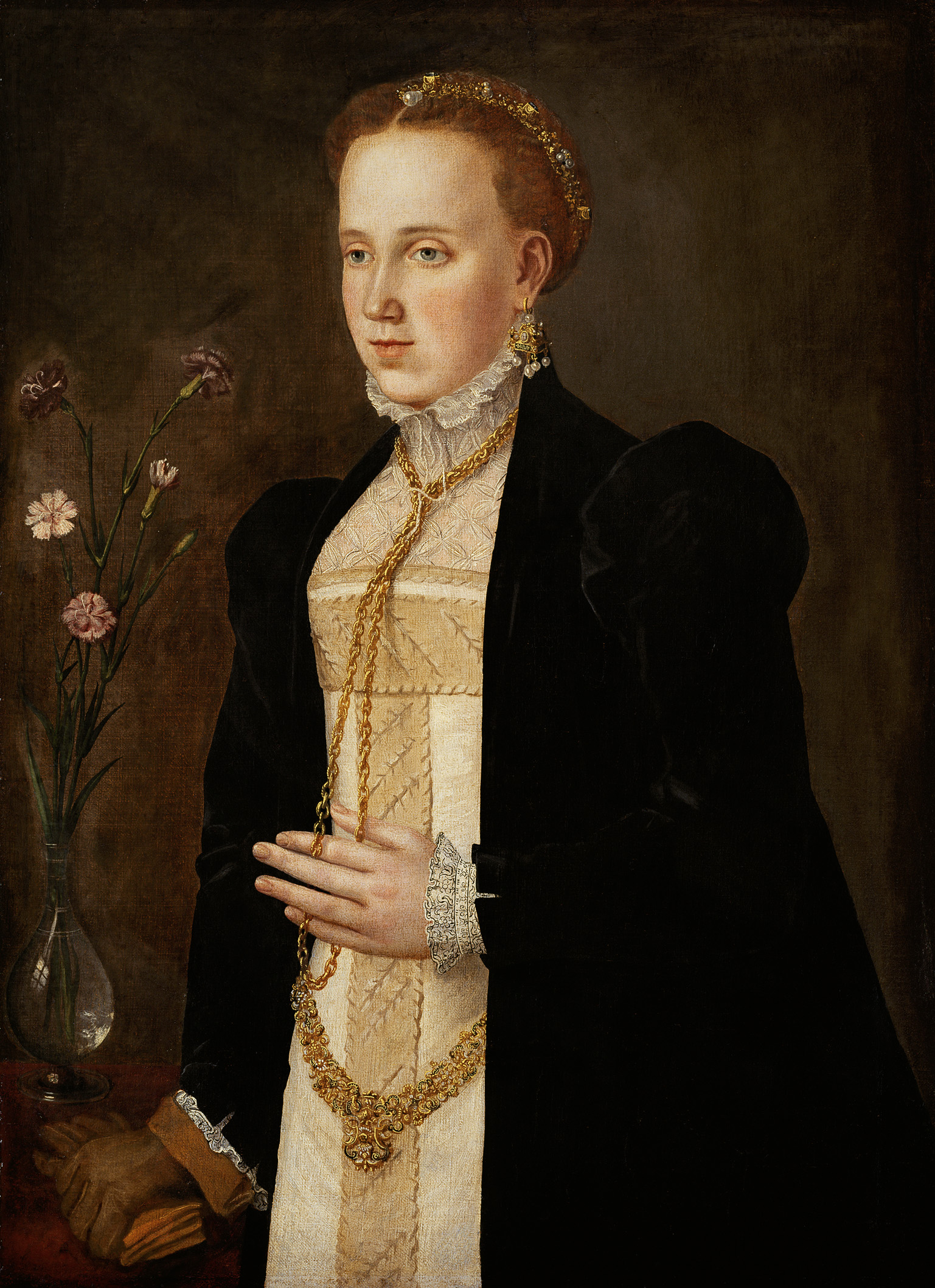
- Philippine Welser, Portrait on Castle Ambras
- Born: 1527; Augsburg
- Died: 24 April 1580 (aged 52–53)
- Noble family: Welser (by birth); Habsburg (by marriage)
- Spouse: Ferdinand II, Archduke of Austria (m. 1557)
- Issue More...: Margrave Andrew of Burgau; Charles, Margrave of Burgau
- Father: Franz (Friedrich) Welser
- Mother: Anna Adler von Zinnenburg

Philippine Welser (1527 – 24 April 1580) was the morganatic wife of Ferdinand II, Archduke of Austria. She was granted the titles Baroness of Zinnenburg, Margravine of Burgau, Landgravine of Mellenburg and Countess of Oberhohenberg and Niederhohenberg.

== Life ==
Philippine Welser's father was Franz (Friedrich) Welser (1497–1572) of the Welser family, an Augsburg merchant and patrician. Her mother was Anna Adler von Zinnenburg (1507–1572), a sister of Czech aristocrat Catherine Lokšanská de Lokšany. She was the niece of the world merchant and banker Bartholomeus V. Welser, although their relationship to one another remains open because of the inadequate sources. The overall incomplete information about her biography (especially her youth) led to the development of many myths soon after her death, the oldest and still most persistent myth being that of her oversized beauty.

The emperor's son Archduke Ferdinand II of Habsburg, Prince of Tyrol, secretly married the bourgeois Philippine – many royal houses used marriages to merge alliances, and this was also planned for Ferdinand II, a not inconsiderable process. According to a documented assurance from Ferdinand from 1576, the marriage took place in January 1557. Their period of acquaintance is uncertain. The romantic historiography of the 19th century assumed that their first encounter was in connection with the Augsburg Diet of 1548. Since Ferdinand did not witness a single act there and he is not mentioned in other records made by people present, it is unlikely that Ferdinand was there at all.

The first documented contact between Philippine and Ferdinand is at a carnival amusement in Plzeň, when they attended a masked ball (including a spectacular "water ballet") in February 1555. A year later, on 12 May 1556, Ferdinand can be documented for the first time at Březnice Castle in Bohemia, when Catharina of Lokšany, an aunt of Philippine, received a passport letter for a drive of cattle. She became a confidante of Ferdinand, who was governor in Bohemia at the time, and was possibly involved in the meeting of the two. The very first (but then earlier) meeting between Philippine and Ferdinand could also have taken place here on Březnice. Březnice initially became the residence for Philippine, the scene of the secret wedding and the birth of her first child, which Ferdinand gave her.

In 1559 at the latest, Emperor Ferdinand I learned of his son's improper marriage, and a settlement was worked out. The marriage had to be kept secret. Any children were excluded from the Habsburg line of succession, but were to be provided for through the purchase of lordships and received the Habsburg coat of arms. In addition, they, as well as Philippine, should receive financial support. With this regulation, the emperor wanted to express his displeasure and limit the resulting legal consequences. As a father, however, he wanted to grant forgiveness and take Philippine and her children under his protection. The couple tried to meet the demands whenever possible. For example, the children of Philippine were officially accepted as foundlings in the castle. The twins Maria and Philipp, who were later born at Castle Pürglitz (Křivoklát), died as infants. When the parents moved from Bohemia to Tyrol, the bodies were secretly taken and buried in the Innsbruck court church. Their battered children's coffins were discovered by chance during restoration work in 1897 and the skeletons were then reburied in a double coffin.

From 1576 onwards, the secrecy of marriage was over. The eldest son Andrew was to be made cardinal, for which proof of legitimate origin was required. The Pope released Archduke Ferdinand from his oath, who then provided evidence as best he could.

The marriage was classified as a happy one. Philippine gave birth to two sons and then twins, who died early.

Her favourite seat in Ambras Castle has been redesigned into a splendid renaissance castle. She had a herb garden laid out and mixed medicines together with her personal physician Dr Georg Handsch and her pharmacist, Dr Gorin Guaranta. A pharmacopoeia occasionally attributed to her comes from her mother Anna Welser's hand. In addition, Philippine has long been credited with a cookbook about dishes of the time. The cookbook was most likely also commissioned by her mother Anna and written by at least three different scribes. However, she had at least made additions or had them made. Her prayer book, with many drawings, has also survived to this day.

She stood up for the common people and for help-seeking nobles, which has been handed down in writing through many petitions addressed to her. This and the fact that she tried to help the people around her with her medicine most likely saved her from defamation because of her improper origin. Her husband signed several goods over to her and gave them plenty of gifts. She received the titles of Margravine of Burgau, Landgravine of Nellenburg and Countess of Ober- and Niederhohenberg.

From 1570 onwards, there were considerable health problems. She died on 24 April 1580. Her husband ordered that she be given a white marble tomb in the silver chapel of the Innsbruck court church. Furthermore, he cared for her servants all his life and also took care of the poor who had supported Philippine.

Her sons, Andreas of Austria (1558–1600), Bishop of Constance and Brixen, and Karl of Austria (1560–1618), imperial general in Hungary, were raised to Margrave of Burgau (at that time, part of Upper Austria).

== Issue ==
- Margrave Andrew of Burgau (15 June 1558 – 12 November 1600). Became a Cardinal in 1576, Margrave of Burgau in 1578, Bishop of Constance in 1589 and Bishop of Brixen in 1591. He had two illegitimate children.
- Charles, Margrave of Burgau (22 November 1560 – 30 October 1618), Margrave of Burgau. He married his first cousin, Sibylle (1557–1627), the youngest daughter of daughter of William, Duke of Jülich-Cleves-Berg (28 July 1516 – 5 January 1592), and Maria, Archduchess of Austria, daughter of Ferdinand I, Holy Roman Emperor. They had no legitimate children. He and his mistress Chiara Elisa Isabella di Ferrero had three illegitimate children.
- Philip of Austria (7 August 1562 – 9 January 1563), twin of Maria.
- Maria of Austria (7 August 1562 – 25 January 1563), twin of Philip.

== Works ==
- De re coquinaria (cookbook), handwriting c. 1545, Castle Ambras near Innsbruck. Inv.No. PA 1473
- Cook- and medicinebook. handwriting c. 1545, Castle Ambras near Innsbruck. Inv.No. PA 1474

== Literature and music ==
- Sigrid-Maria Größing: Kaufmannstochter im Kaiserhaus. Philippine Welser und ihre Heilkunst, Vienna: Kremayr und Scheriau, 1992, 254 Pages, ISBN 3-218-00531-0
- Sigrid-Maria Größing: Die Heilkunst der Philippine Welser. Außenseiterin im Hause Habsburg. Augsburg: Sankt-Ulrich-Verlag, 1998, 160 Pages, ISBN 3-929246-28-7
- Karl Beer: Philippine Welser als Freundin der Heilkunst. In: Gesnerus 7 (1950) 80–86
- Alfred Auer: Philippine Welser & Anna Caterina Gonzaga die Gemahlinnen Erzherzog Ferdinands II.. Wien: Kunsthistorisches Museum Wien, Sammlungen Schloß Ambras, 1998, 72 pages, ISBN 3702007725
- Anna Schuppe: incidental music for Philippine Weiser (theatre production)
