= Freihalden station =

Railway station in Germany

Freihalden
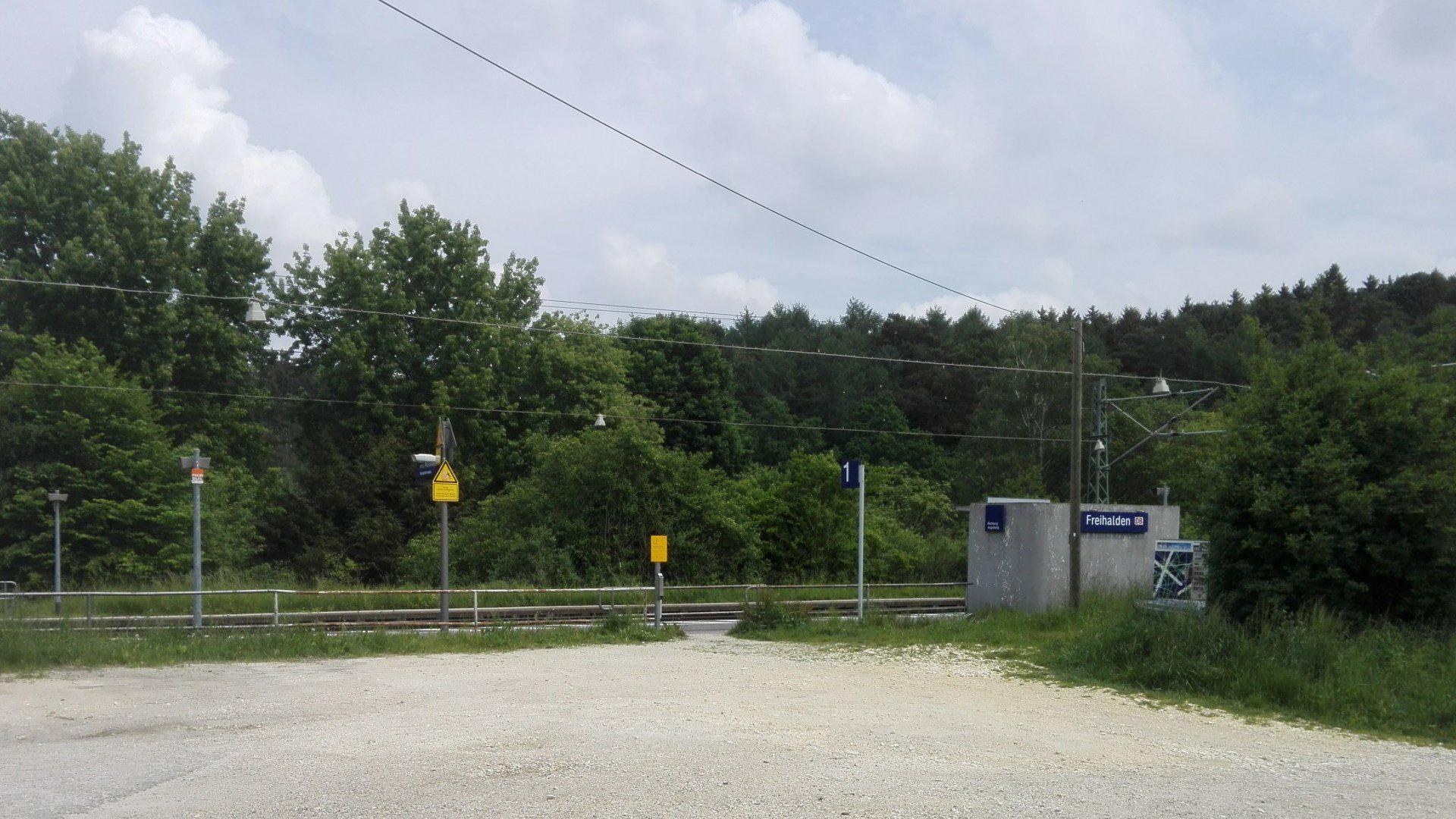

General information
- Location: Jettingen-Scheppach, Bavaria; Germany
- Coordinates: 48°23′05″N 10°30′09″E
- System: Hp
- Owner: DB Netz
- Operator: DB Station&Service
- Lines: Ulm–Augsburg line (KBS 980)
- Platforms: 2 side platforms
- Tracks: 2
- Train operators: Go-Ahead Bayern
- Connections: RE 9

Other information
- Station code: 1903
- DS100 code: MFHD
- IBNR: 8002074
- Category: 6
- Fare zone: 243 (VVM)
- Website: stationsdatenbank.de

Services
Preceding station		Following station
Jettingen towards Ulm Hbf	RE 9	Dinkelscherben towards München Hbf
Location
- Location within Bavaria Location within Germany Location within Europe

Freihalden station (German: Haltepunkt Jettingen) is a stop on the Augsburg-Ulm railroad line of Deutsche Bahn and is located in the municipality of Jettingen-Scheppach in the Freihalden district. The trains are operated by Deutsche Bahn Regio Bayern.

== Services ==
As of the December 2020 timetable change, the following services stop at Burgau (Schwab):

- RE 9: hourly service between Ulm Hauptbahnhof and München Hauptbahnhof.
