= Andrew, Margrave of Burgau =

His Eminence Andrew of Austria
- Margrave of Burgau; Prince-Bishop of Constance; Abbot of Murbach; Prince-Bishop of Brixen; Cardinal-Priest of Santa Maria Nuova
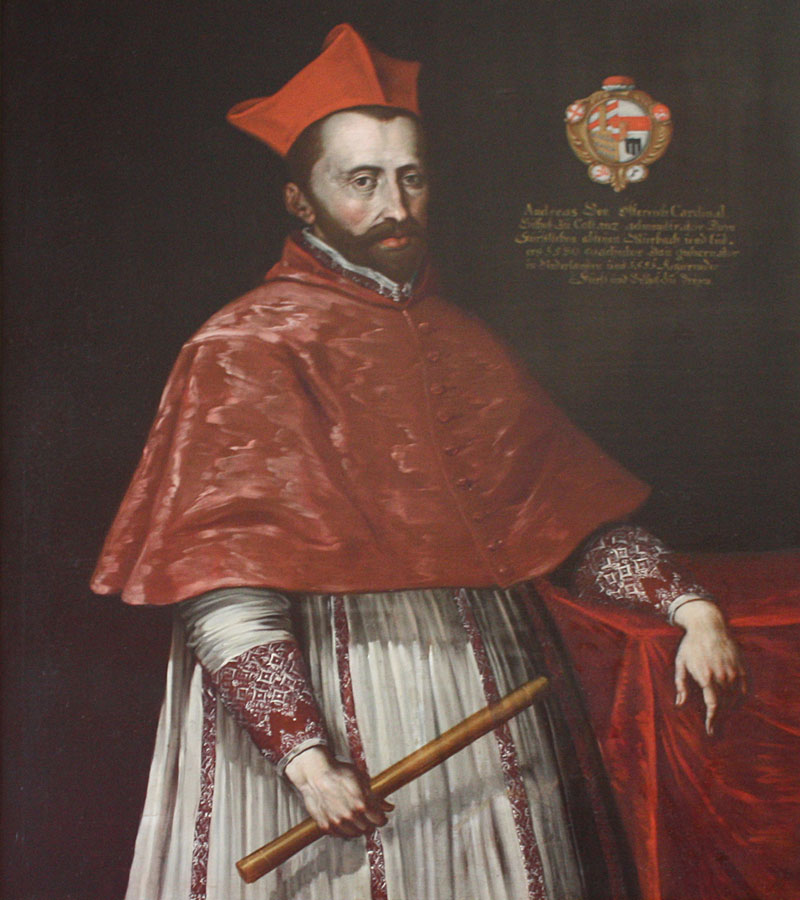
- Late 16th-century portrait
- Church: Roman Catholic Church
- Province: Mainz
- Metropolis: Mainz
- Diocese: Constance
- Installed: 1589
- Term ended: 12 November 1600
- Other posts: Abbot of Murbach, Bishop of Brixen

Orders
- Created cardinal: March 1574 by Pope Gregory XIII
- Rank: Cardinal-Priest

Personal details
- Born: 15 June 1558 Březnice Castle, Březnice, Kingdom of Bohemia
- Died: 12 November 1600 (aged 42) Rome, Papal States
- Buried: Santa Maria dell'Anima, Rome

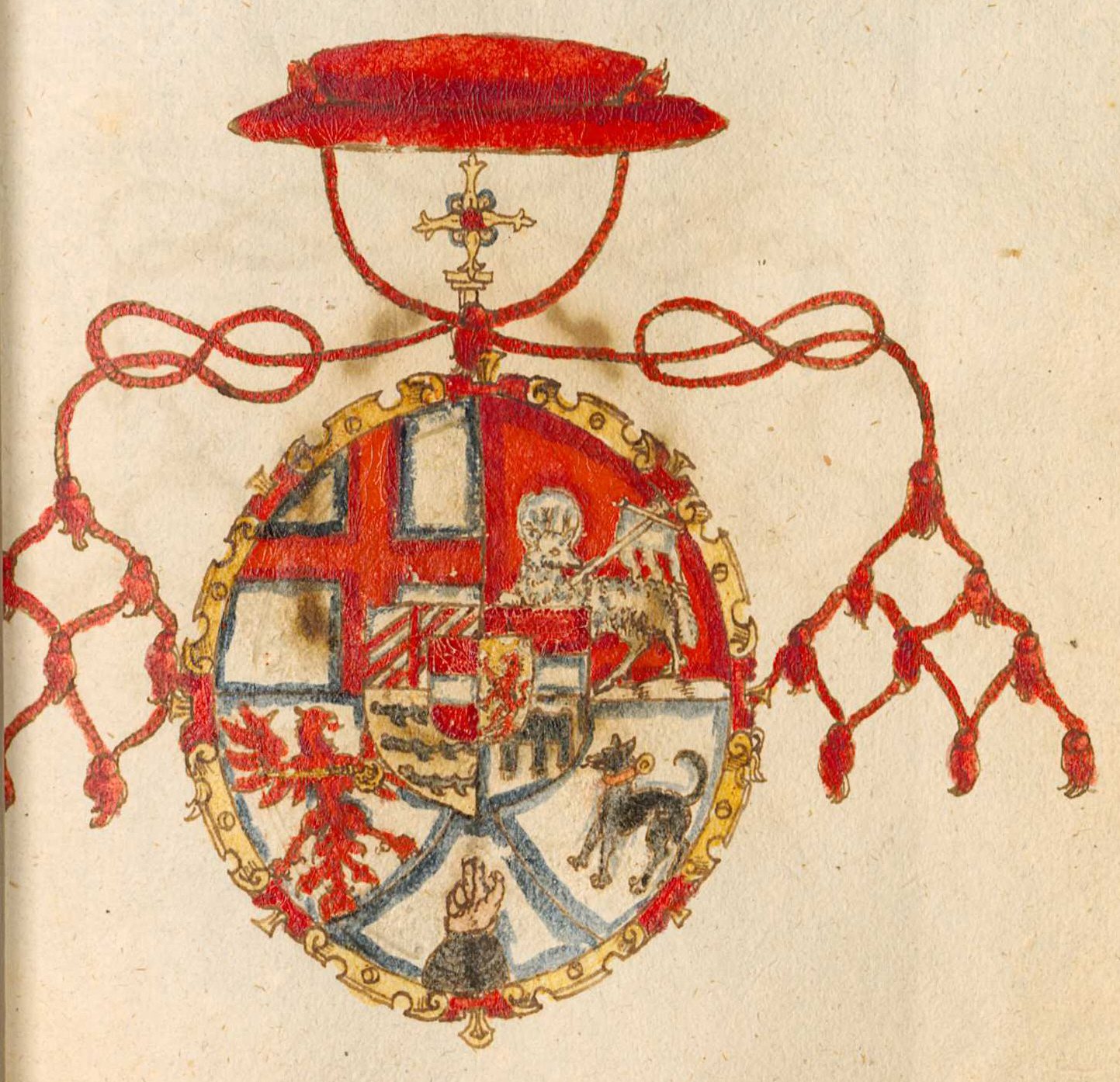
Andrew's coat of arms

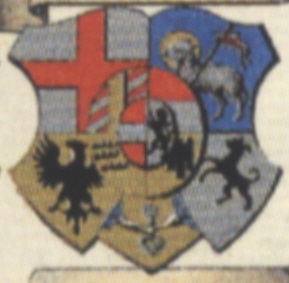
His coat of arms when he was Bishop of Constance

Andrew of Austria, Margrave of Burgau (German: Andreas von Österreich; 15 June 1558 – 12 November 1600) was a cardinal who belonged to the Austrian nobility, descending from its ruling dynasty, the House of Habsburg.

== Youth ==
Andrew and his younger brother Charles grew up at Bresnitz Castle in Březnice, Bohemia, and later at Ambras Castle in Innsbruck, Tyrol. The marriage of their parents, Ferdinand II, Archduke of Austria and Philippine Welser, was morganatic. This meant that the brothers were not considered members of the Habsburg dynasty and could not use their father's title, Archduke of Austria, bearing instead that of Margrave of Burgau.

His father decided that Andrew should have a career in the clergy. In March 1574, Andrew travelled to Rome, where Pope Gregory XIII made him a cardinal, with Santa Maria Nuova as his titular church. Andrew was only 17 years old, his father having obtained the position for him.

== Later life ==
Andrew was Abbot of Murbach from 1587, until his death. From 1589, he was also Bishop of Constance and from 1589 Bishop of Brixen. In 1598 and 1599, he briefly served as acting Governor General of the Habsburg Netherlands while Archduke Albert VII travelled to Spain to marry Infanta Isabella Clara Eugenia.

In 1600, he traveled to Rome to celebrate the Jubilee, afterwards visiting Naples. On his return journey, he fell ill and died after receiving the last rites from the Pope himself. He was buried in Santa Maria dell'Anima in Rome. His marble funeral monument in the church was completed by the sculptors Gillis van den Vliete and Nicolas Mostaert around 1600 and includes a portrait of Andrew kneeling in prayer.

== Issue ==
Andrew had two illegitimate children with Dorotea de Montfort. They were raised by his brother Charles and his wife Sibylle.

- Hans-Georg Degli Abizzi (b. 1583), married Susanna Yperhofen von Yperhofstal
- Susanna Degli Abizzi (1584–1653), married Johann Schratz with issue

== Male-line family tree ==
House of Habsburg

Original line
Albert; Count of Habsburg c. 1188–1239
Rudolf I of Germany c. 1218–1291
Albert I of Germany; 1255–1308	Hartmann; 1263–1281	Rudolf II; Duke of Austria; 1270–1290
Rudolf I of Bohemia; 1281–1307	Frederick the Fair c. 1289–1330	Leopold I Duke of Austria; 1290–1326	Albert II; Duke of Austria; 1298–1358	Henry the Friendly; 1299–1327	Otto; Duke of Austria; 1301–1339	John; Parricida c. 1290–1312/1313
Albertinian line	Leopoldian line
Rudolf IV; Duke of Austria; 1339–1365	Frederick III; 1347–1362	Albert III; Duke of Austria; 1349–1395	Leopold III; Duke of Austria; 1351–1386	Frederick II; Duke of Austria; 1327–1344	Leopold II; Duke of Austria; 1328–1344
Albert IV; Duke of Austria; 1377–1404	William; Duke of Austria c. 1370–1406	Leopold IV; Duke of Austria; 1371–1411	Ernest; Duke of Austria; 1377–1424	Frederick IV; Duke of Austria; 1382–1439
Albert II of Germany; 1397–1439	Frederick III; HRE; 1415–1493	Albert VI; Archduke of Austria; 1418–1463	Sigismund; Archduke of Austria; 1427–1496
Ladislaus the Posthumous; 1440–1457	Maximilian I HRE; 1459–1519
Philip I of Castile; 1478–1506
Spanish / Iberian line	Austrian / HRE line
Charles V HRE; 1500–1558	Ferdinand I HRE; 1503–1564
Philip II of Spain; 1527–1598	Maximilian II; HRE; 1527–1576	Ferdinand II; Archduke of Austria; 1529–1595	Charles II; Archduke of Austria; 1540–1590
Carlos; Prince of Asturias; 1545–1568	Philip III of Spain; 1578–1621	Rudolf II; HRE; 1552–1612	Ernest of Austria; 1553–1595	Matthias; HRE; 1557–1619	Maximilian III; Archduke of Austria; 1558–1618	Albert VII; Archduke of Austria; 1559–1621	Wenceslaus; Archduke of Austria; 1561–1578	Andrew; Margrave of Burgau; 1558–1600	Charles; Margrave of Burgau; 1560–1618	Ferdinand II; HRE; 1578–1637	Maximilian Ernest of Austria; 1583–1616	Leopold V Archduke of Austria; 1586–1632	Charles of Austria; 1590–1624
Philip IV of Spain; 1605–1665	Charles of Austria; 1607–1632	Ferdinand of Austria; 1609–1641	John-Charles of Austria; 1605–1619	Ferdinand III; HRE; 1608–1657	Leopold Wilhelm of Austria; 1614–1662	Ferdinand Charles; Archduke of Austria; 1628–1662	Sigismund Francis; Archduke of Austria; 1630–1665
Balthasar Charles; Prince of Asturias; 1629–1646	Charles II of Spain; 1661–1700	Ferdinand IV; King of the Romans; 1633–1654	Leopold I HRE; 1640–1705	Charles Joseph of Austria; 1649–1664
Joseph I HRE; 1678–1711	Charles VI; HRE; 1685–1740
Lorraine
Maria Theresa; HRE; 1740–1780	Francis I HRE; 1745–1765
Habsburg-Lorraine
Joseph II; HRE; 1765–1790	Leopold II; HRE; 1790–1792
Francis II; HRE; 1792–1806

== Notes ==
Andrew, Margrave of Burgau House of Habsburg Born: 15 June 1558 Died: 12 November 1600
Catholic Church titles
Preceded by Mark Sittich von Hohenems Altemps	Bishop of Constance; 1589-1600	Succeeded by John George of Hallwyl
Preceded by John Thomas of Spauer	Bishop of Brixen; 1591-1600	Succeeded by Christopher Andrew of Spauer
