= Dinkelscherben station =

Railway station in Germany

Dinkelscherben
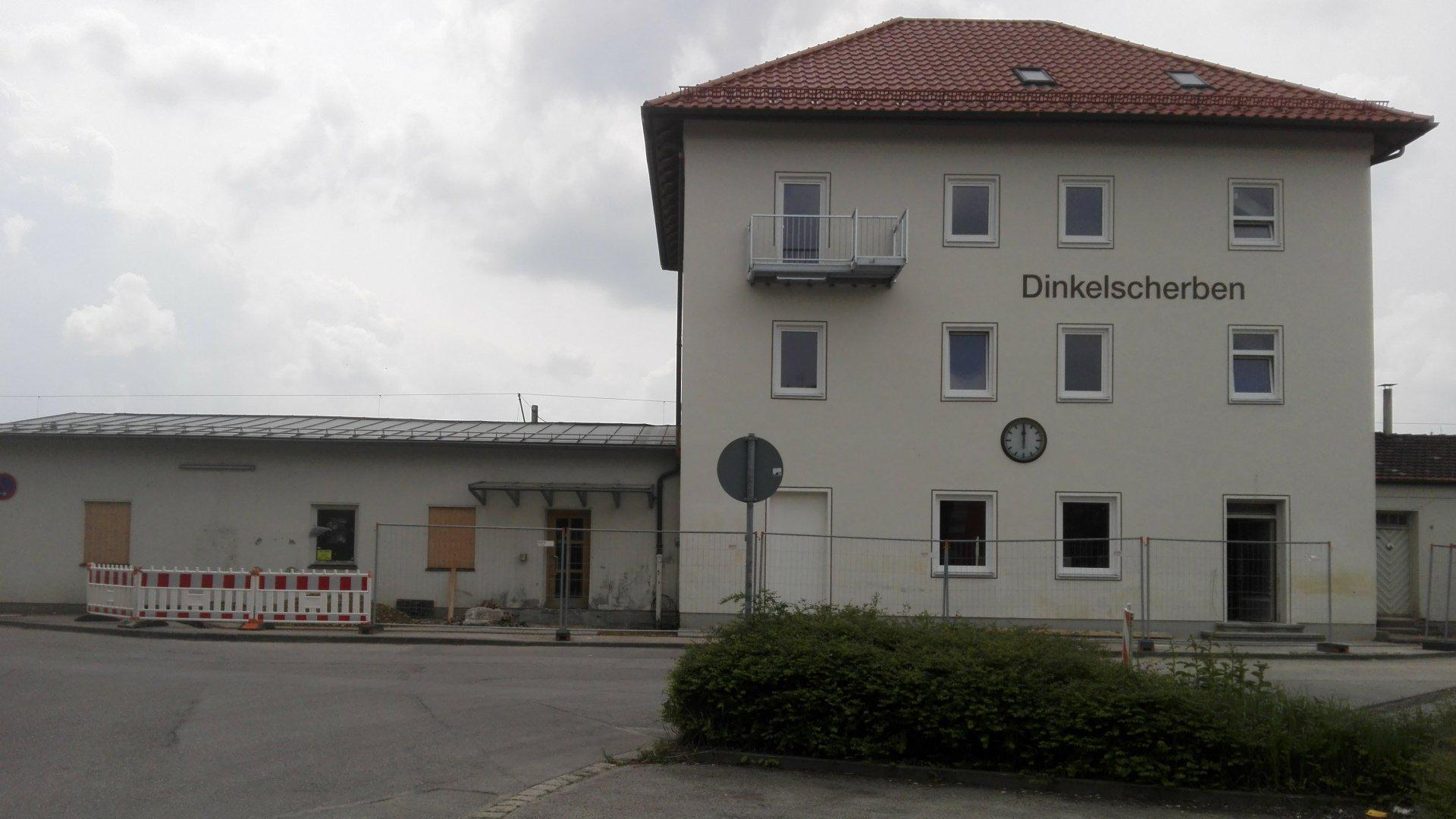

General information
- Location: Bahnhofsplatz 6; 86424 Dinkelscherben; Bavaria; Germany
- Coordinates: 48.343°N 10.587°E
- System: Bf
- Owner: Deutsche Bahn
- Operator: DB Netz; DB Station&Service
- Lines: Ulm–Augsburg railway (KBS 980); Dinkelscherben–Thannhausen railway
- Platforms: 1 island platform 1 side platform
- Tracks: 5
- Train operators: Go-Ahead Bayern
- Connections: RE 9; RB 86; 596 610 611 612

Construction
- Parking: yes
- Cycle facilities: yes
- Accessible: partly

Other information
- Station code: 1222
- DS100 code: MDKS
- IBNR: 8001468
- Category: 5
- Fare zone: : 50 and 60; 243 (VVM)
- Website: www.bahnhof.de

Services
Preceding station		Following station
Freihalden towards Ulm Hbf	RE 9	Kutzenhausen towards München Hbf
Terminus	RB 86	Kutzenhausen towards München Hbf
Location
- Location within Bavaria Location within Germany Location within Europe

Dinkelscherben station (German: Bahnhof Dinkelscherben) is a railway station in the municipality of Dinkelscherben, located in the Augsburg district in Bavaria, Germany. It is located on the Ulm-Augsburg railroad line and on the disused Dinkelscherben-Thannhausen line. The trains are operated by DB Regio Bayern.

== Services ==
As of the December 2020 timetable change, the following services stop at Burgau (Schwab):

- RE 9: hourly service between Ulm Hauptbahnhof and München Hauptbahnhof.
- RB 86 : hourly service between Dinkelscherben and München Hauptbahnhof.
