= Offingen station =

Railway station in Germany

Offingen
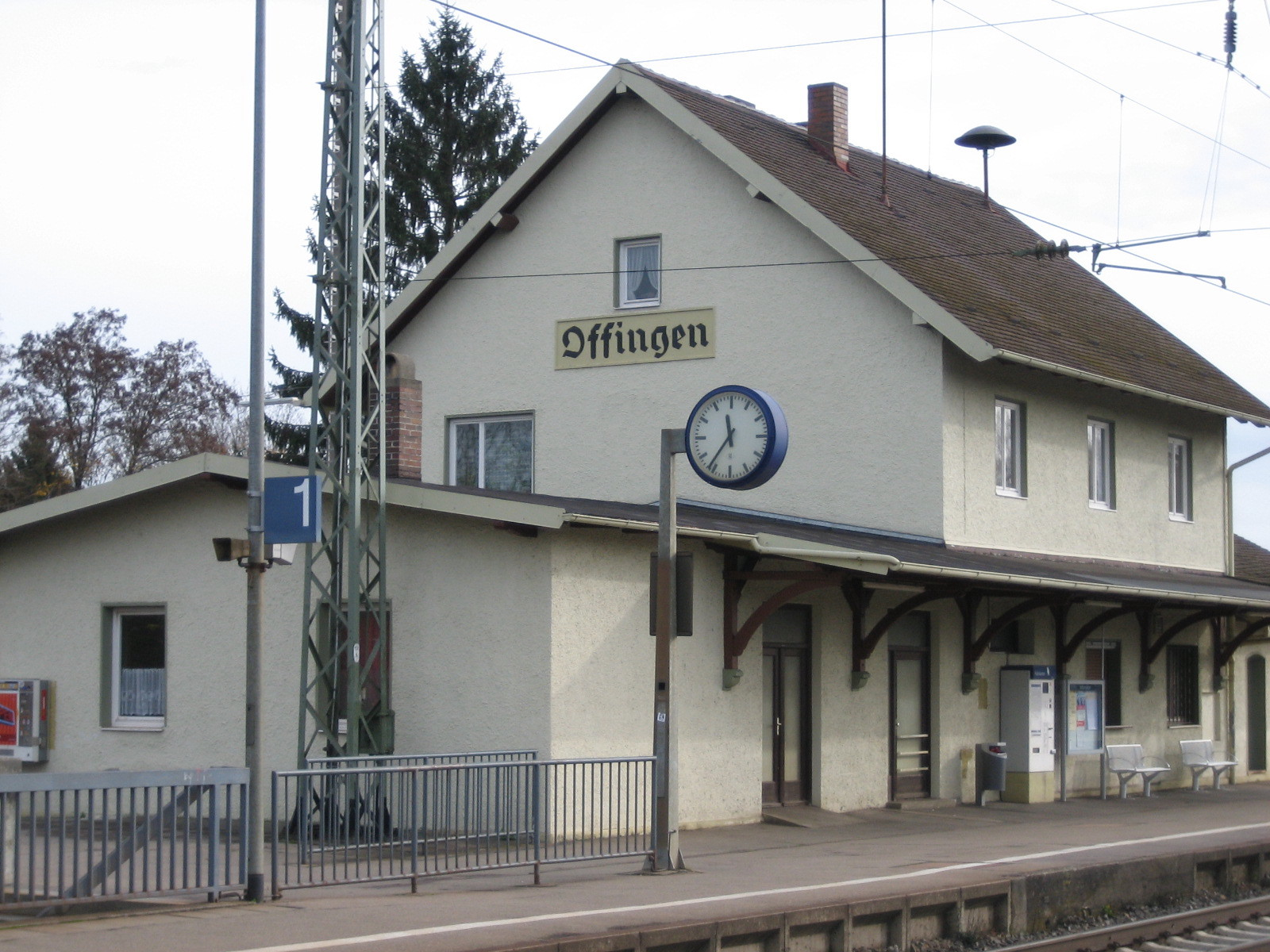
- The station in 2008

General information
- Location: Offingen, Bavaria; Germany
- Coordinates: 48°28′54″N 10°22′34″E
- Owner: DB Netz
- Lines: Ulm–Augsburg line (KBS 980)
- Distance: 53.2 km (33.1 mi) from Augsburg Hauptbahnhof
- Platforms: 2 side platforms
- Tracks: 2
- Train operators: Arverio Bayern
- Connections: Regionalbus: 851, 853, 889, 892; Flexibus

Other information
- Station code: 4748
- DS100 code: MOFF
- IBNR: 8004654
- Category: 6
- Fare zone: 142 (VVM)

Services
Preceding station		Following station
Günzburg towards Ulm Hbf	RE 9	Mindelaltheim towards München Hbf
Location

Offingen station (German: Bahnhof Offingen), is a railway station in the municipality of Offingen, in Bavaria, Germany. It is located on the standard gauge Ulm–Augsburg line of Deutsche Bahn.

== Services ==
As of the December 2020 timetable change, the following services stop at Offingen:

- RE: hourly service between Ulm Hauptbahnhof and München Hauptbahnhof.
