= Burgau (Schwab) station =

Railway station in Germany

Burgau (Schwab)
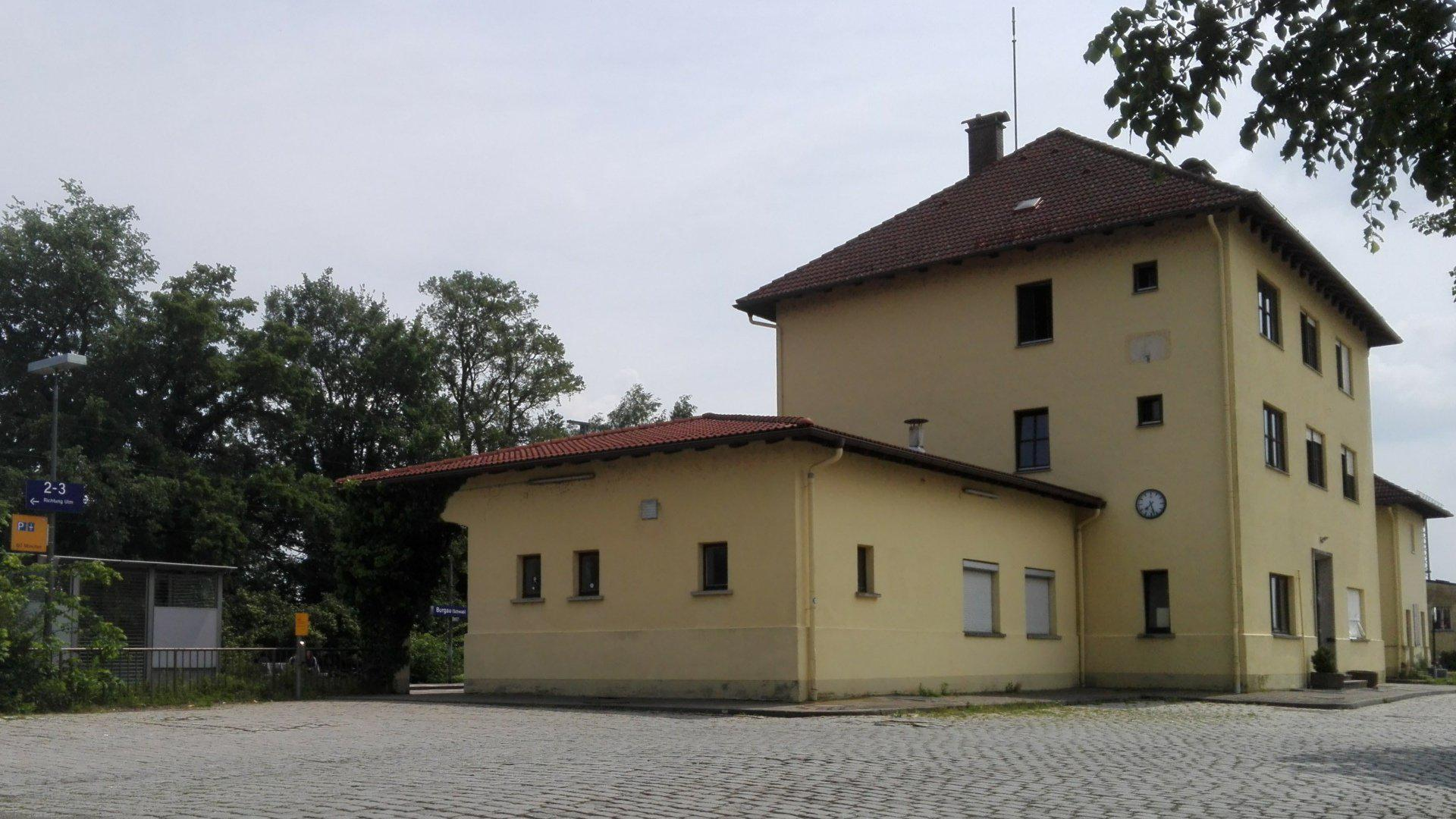
- The station building in 2018

General information
- Location: Burgau, Bavaria; Germany
- Coordinates: 48°25′29″N 10°25′37″E
- Owner: DB Netz
- Lines: Ulm–Augsburg line (KBS 980)
- Distance: 45.7 km (28.4 mi) from Augsburg Hauptbahnhof
- Platforms: 1 island platform; 1 side platform
- Tracks: 3
- Train operators: Go-Ahead Bayern
- Connections: Bus lines

Other information
- Station code: 979
- DS100 code: MBGU
- IBNR: 8001276
- Category: 5
- Fare zone: 200 (VVM)

Services
Preceding station		Following station
Mindelaltheim towards Ulm Hbf	RE 9	Jettingen towards München Hbf
Location

Burgau (Schwab) station (German: Bahnhof Burgau (Schwab)), is a railway station in the town of Burgau, in Bavaria, Germany. It is located on the standard gauge Ulm–Augsburg line of Deutsche Bahn.

== Services ==
As of the December 2020 timetable change, the following services stop at Burgau (Schwab):

- RE: hourly service between Ulm Hauptbahnhof and München Hauptbahnhof.
