= Sibylle of Jülich-Cleves-Berg =

German duchess (1557–1628)

Sibylle
- Margravine of Burgau
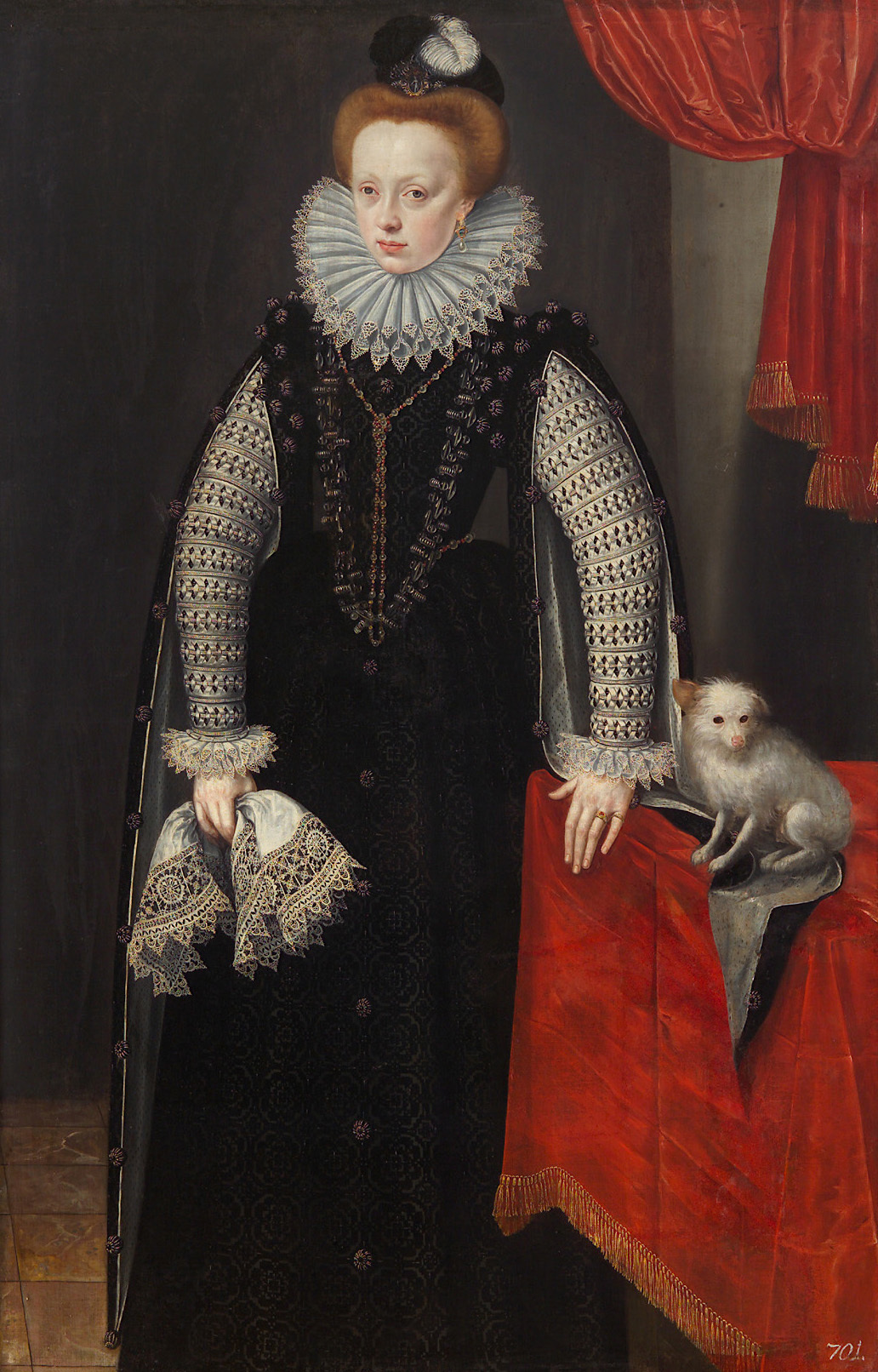
- Portrait by Lucas van Valckenborch, c. 1579–1580
- Born: 26 August 1557
- Died: 1628 (aged 70–71)
- Burial: Capuchin Church in Günzburg
- Spouse: Charles, Margrave of Burgau
- House: La Marck
- Father: William, Duke of Jülich-Cleves-Berg
- Mother: Archduchess Maria of Austria

Sibylle of Jülich-Cleves-Berg, Margravine of Burgau (26 August 1557 in Cleves – 1628 in Günzburg) was the daughter of Duke William the Rich and his second wife, Archduchess Maria of Austria.

== Life ==
Born as the fifth daughter of William and Maria, her maternal grandparents were Ferdinand I, Holy Roman Emperor and Anne of Bohemia and Hungary. Her paternal grandparents were John III, Duke of Cleves and Maria of Jülich-Berg.

Sibylle and her siblings grew up in Düsseldorf Castle. Of Sibylle's mother and their relationship not much is known, apart from that she was generally considered a pious woman who may have grown mentally disturbed towards the end of her life because of religious scruples. She is little mentioned in letters between the sisters. In 1581 Sibylle was the only daughter present at the deathbed of her mother at Hambach Castle.

Their paternal aunt Amalia played a great part in raising her nieces, though William resented the fact that she was a Lutheran and tried to influence his daughters to abandon the Catholic faith. Another aunt of Sibylle's, Anne, was for a short time the wife of the Protestant king Henry VIII of England. The influence of Lutheran sentiment at the Düsseldorf court worried the papal ambassadors present, and they suggested that Sibylle and her sisters be either sent to their aunt Anna of Austria in Munich, or that they be sent to a convent where they would receive proper guidance in the Catholic faith. Their father, however, refused.

While all of Sibylle's sisters embraced Lutheranism and rejected efforts to marry them off to Catholic princes, she herself would later revert to Catholicism.

=== Marriage plans ===
In 1582, marriage between Sibylle and Charles of Arenberg was promoted by Arenberg's mother Marguerite de La Marck, who was an intimate of Sibylle and her sisters. Sibylle's cousins, Rudolf II and Philip II of Spain, however, held off on making a decision in the matter. In the end, the marriage never occurred, because of the class differences between the two houses and the difficult political situation.

Sibylle's brother Johann Wilhelm married Jakobea of Baden in 1585. In 1586, Sibylle was betrothed to Jakobea's brother, Philip II, Margrave of Baden-Baden. Philip had grown up at the court of Albert V of Bavaria, who was married to Sibylle's maternal aunt, Anna. Negotiations for the dowry were finished in 1588, but shortly before the wedding the groom became ill and died at the age of twenty-nine.

Two years later, in 1590, Edward Fortunatus of Baden-Rodemachern, a cousin of Sibylle's fiancée visited the Düsseldorf court, was quite taken with Sibylle, and requested permission from the emperor to court her. However, this request was not even met with a reply. Edward Fortunatus, though of sufficient high birth, had little in fortune and had a reputation for living "an evil life", though he was the nephew of the Lutheran John III, King of Sweden. Edward Fortunatus himself had converted to Catholicism in 1584, which would have theoretically strengthened the Catholic presence in the region.

This was something which concerned papal ambassadors, who saw a marriage between Sibylle and a Catholic prince as the only way to prevent the principalities from passing to Protestant rulers, and therefore pushed for Sibylle's marriage to one of the emperor's brothers (and Sibylle's cousins). First, Archduke Ernst was suggested, but there was not much support for such a marriage. Ernst was currently in marriage negotiations for the hand of Anna Vasa, but suggested his brother Maximilian III, Archduke of Austria, in an effort to be able to claim the Polish crown by giving his brother the opportunity to become ruler of another territory.

Since the legal situation regarding succession in the conglomerate of principalities on the Lower Rhine was quite unclear, due to a law passed by Sibylle's father, William declared that in the case of the extinction of the male line the duchies would pass through a daughter. However, the nature of this female succession was not clear, in that it was not obvious whether or not the duchies should pass through the eldest daughter, the eldest living daughter, or the eldest male descendant of a daughter. The extinction of the male line looked more and more likely, since Sibylle's brother had fathered no children with his first wife. In that case, her husband would have the might of the Habsburgs behind him and be able to secure the succession.

Sibylle's father requested in 1591 that Ferdinand would betroth his son Charles of Burgau to Sibylle, but his father at the time was holding out for a marriage with the infanta Isabella Clara Eugenia for his son.

Later, in 1593, Archduke Matthias was asked by Rudolf if he wanted to marry Sybille, but the answer was indecisive. In 1597 the councillors in Julich approved of marriage between Sibylle and Mathias.

=== Conflict with Jakobea of Baden ===
Since their older brother Karl Frederick had died in 1575, her brother John William inherited the United Duchies of Jülich-Cleves-Berg in 1592. After he developed a mental illness, a power struggle broke out at court between Sibylle and her sister-in-law, Jakobea of Baden. Sibylle won, and imprisoned Jakobea. Sibylle may also have been partially responsible for Jakobea's violent death in 1597.

=== Marriage ===
In 1601, Sibylle married her cousin Margrave Charles of Burgau. In 1610, the couple moved into the residence at Günzburg. Here, she entertained a feudal court, even after her husband died in 1618. She acted in particular as patron of music. The marriage was childless but the couple raised Andrew (Sibylle's brother-in-law's) illegitimate children, Hans-Georg Degli Abizzi (b. 1583) and Susanna Degli Abizzi (1584–1653)

== Death ==
Sibylle was buried next to her husband in the Capuchin Church in Günzburg. When the church was demolished, her remains were transferred to the St. Martin's Church, also in Günzburg.
