= Charles, Margrave of Burgau =

German nobleman

Charles
- Margrave of Burgau
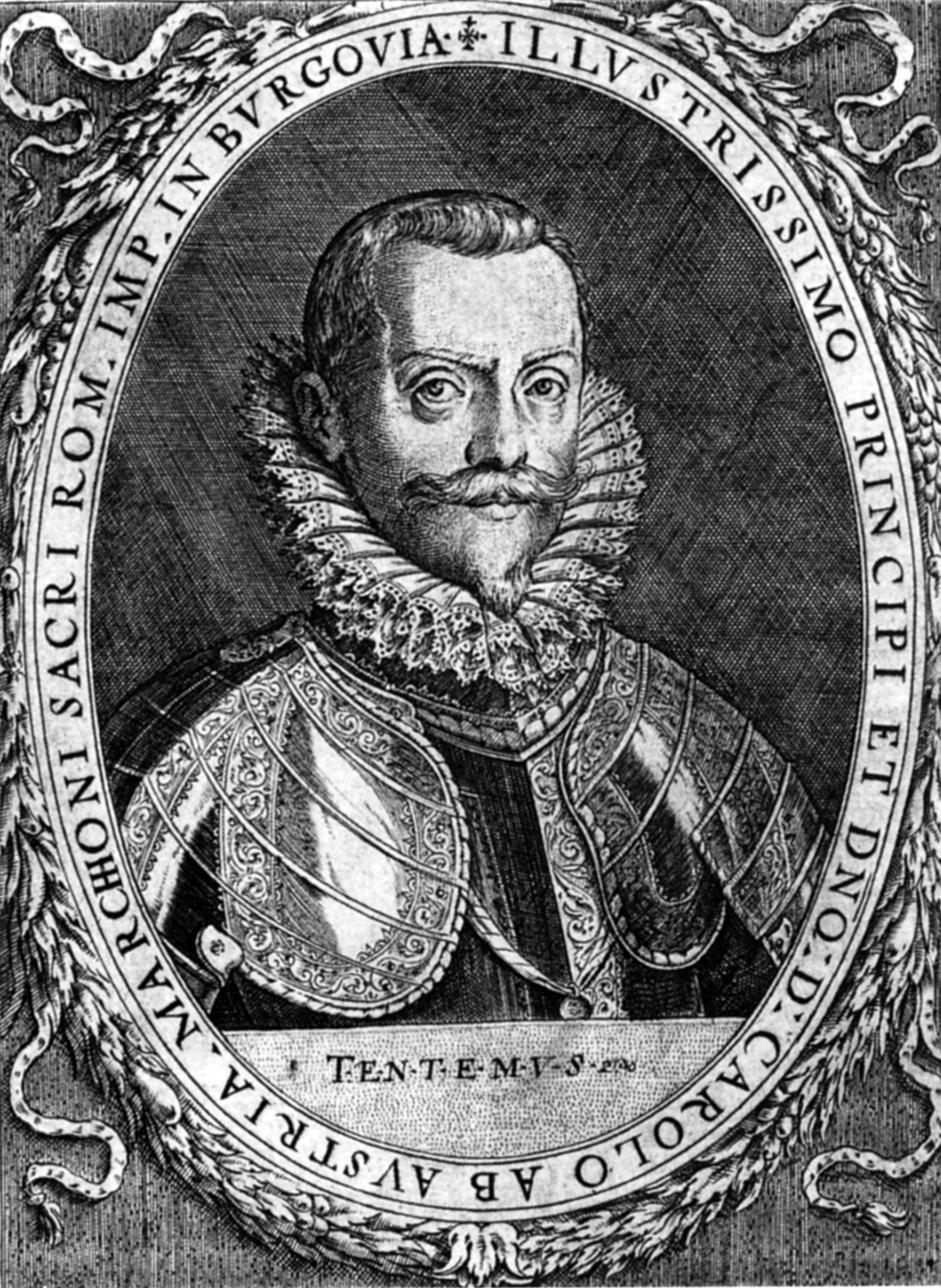
- Charles, Margrave of Burgau, copper engraving by Dominicus Custos, after 1606
- Born: 22 November 1560; Křivoklát Castle in Bohemia
- Died: 30 October 1618 (aged 57); Überlingen
- Buried: Capuchin monastery in Günzburg
- Noble family: Habsburg
- Spouse: Sibylle of Jülich-Cleves-Berg
- Father: Ferdinand II, Archduke of Austria
- Mother: Philippine Welser

Charles, Margrave of Burgau, also known as Charles of Austria, (22 November 1560 at Křivoklát Castle in Bohemia – 30 October 1618 in Überlingen), was the son of Archduke Ferdinand II of Austria and his first morganatic marriage to Philippine Welser. He was the brother of Andrew of Austria.

== Biography ==
Charles of Burgau pursued a military career. He unsuccessfully led a Spanish regiment in the war against the Netherlands and was then deployed in the Long War against the Ottoman Empire. Here, he recorded some successes — at the expense of his soldiers, who were hungry and unpaid; some of them deserted — and was promoted to Field Marshal.

His father died in 1595. Since Charles was born from a morganatic marriage, he was not entitled to inherit the archduchy. He was, however, amply compensated financially and given some territories. His most important possession was the Margraviate of Burgau. He also held the Landgraviate of Nellenburg and the County of Hohenberg. Contemporary sources describe his magnificent court at his residence, Günzburg Castle.

Charles was not popular among his subjects, whom he forbade to drink wheat beer. Nor was he popular among the noble residents of his margraviate, who included the Bishop of Augsburg, the Counts of Fugger and the free imperial cities of Ulm and Augsburg, and with whom he had conflict about tax increases and about their sovereign rights.

In 1615 or 1616, he founded a Capuchin monastery in Günzburg. In 1617, he expelled the Jews from Günzburg; they were ordered to leave the city within a year.

Charles died on 30 October 1618. In 1619, his body was transferred to the church of the Capuchin monastery in Günzburg. His widow as also buried there, in 1627. When the monastery was demolished in 1806, both bodies were transferred to St. Martin's church in Günzburg.

== Marriage and issue ==
In 1601, Charles married Sibylle (26 August 1557 – 1627), the daughter of Duke William of Jülich-Cleves-Berg. This marriage remained childless, and after Charles's death, his possessions fell back to the main line of the House of Habsburg.

However, Charles had several children from extramarital affairs:

1. With Chiara Elisa Isabella di Ferrero:
  1. Anna Elisabeth, Baroness of Hohenberg (* 1588, † 1621 in Vienna), married in 1607 Pietro Francesco di Ferrero, Marchese della Marmora († 1611)
2. With an unknown woman:
  1. Charles, Baron of Hohenberg
  2. Ferdinand, Baron of Hohenberg

== Ancestors ==
Ancestors of Charles, Margrave of Burgau

8. Philip I, King of Castile
4. Ferdinand I, Holy Roman Emperor
9. Joanna, Queen of Castile
2. Ferdinand II, Archduke of Austria
10. Vladislas II, King of Bohemia and Hungary
5. Anne of Bohemia and Hungary
11. Anne of Foix-Candale
1. Charles, Margrave of Burgau
6. Franz (Friedrich) Welser
3. Philippine Welser
7. Anna Adler

== Male-line family tree ==
House of Habsburg

Original line
Albert; Count of Habsburg c. 1188–1239
Rudolf I of Germany c. 1218–1291
Albert I of Germany; 1255–1308 | Hartmann; 1263–1281 | Rudolf II; Duke of Austria; 1270–1290
Rudolf I of Bohemia; 1281–1307 | Frederick the Fair c. 1289–1330 | Leopold I Duke of Austria; 1290–1326 | Albert II; Duke of Austria; 1298–1358 | Henry the Friendly; 1299–1327 | Otto; Duke of Austria; 1301–1339 | John; Parricida c. 1290–1312/1313
Albertinian line | Leopoldian line
Rudolf IV; Duke of Austria; 1339–1365 | Frederick III; 1347–1362 | Albert III; Duke of Austria; 1349–1395 | Leopold III; Duke of Austria; 1351–1386 | Frederick II; Duke of Austria; 1327–1344 | Leopold II; Duke of Austria; 1328–1344
Albert IV; Duke of Austria; 1377–1404 | William; Duke of Austria c. 1370–1406 | Leopold IV; Duke of Austria; 1371–1411 | Ernest; Duke of Austria; 1377–1424 | Frederick IV; Duke of Austria; 1382–1439
Albert II of Germany; 1397–1439 | Frederick III; HRE; 1415–1493 | Albert VI; Archduke of Austria; 1418–1463 | Sigismund; Archduke of Austria; 1427–1496
Ladislaus the Posthumous; 1440–1457 | Maximilian I HRE; 1459–1519
Philip I of Castile; 1478–1506
Spanish / Iberian line | Austrian / HRE line
Charles V HRE; 1500–1558 | Ferdinand I HRE; 1503–1564
Philip II of Spain; 1527–1598 | Maximilian II; HRE; 1527–1576 | Ferdinand II; Archduke of Austria; 1529–1595 | Charles II; Archduke of Austria; 1540–1590
Carlos; Prince of Asturias; 1545–1568 | Philip III of Spain; 1578–1621 | Rudolf II; HRE; 1552–1612 | Ernest of Austria; 1553–1595 | Matthias; HRE; 1557–1619 | Maximilian III; Archduke of Austria; 1558–1618 | Albert VII; Archduke of Austria; 1559–1621 | Wenceslaus; Archduke of Austria; 1561–1578 | Andrew; Margrave of Burgau; 1558–1600 | Charles; Margrave of Burgau; 1560–1618 | Ferdinand II; HRE; 1578–1637 | Maximilian Ernest of Austria; 1583–1616 | Leopold V Archduke of Austria; 1586–1632 | Charles of Austria; 1590–1624
Philip IV of Spain; 1605–1665 | Charles of Austria; 1607–1632 | Ferdinand of Austria; 1609–1641 | John-Charles of Austria; 1605–1619 | Ferdinand III; HRE; 1608–1657 | Leopold Wilhelm of Austria; 1614–1662 | Ferdinand Charles; Archduke of Austria; 1628–1662 | Sigismund Francis; Archduke of Austria; 1630–1665
Balthasar Charles; Prince of Asturias; 1629–1646 | Charles II of Spain; 1661–1700 | Ferdinand IV; King of the Romans; 1633–1654 | Leopold I HRE; 1640–1705 | Charles Joseph of Austria; 1649–1664
Joseph I HRE; 1678–1711 | Charles VI; HRE; 1685–1740
Lorraine
Maria Theresa; HRE; 1740–1780 | Francis I HRE; 1745–1765
Habsburg-Lorraine
Joseph II; HRE; 1765–1790 | Leopold II; HRE; 1790–1792
Francis II; HRE; 1792–1806
