= Karl Friedrich of Jülich-Cleves-Berg =

Heir-apparent to the United Duchies of Jülich-Cleves-Berg

Karl Frederick of Jülich-Cleves-Berg
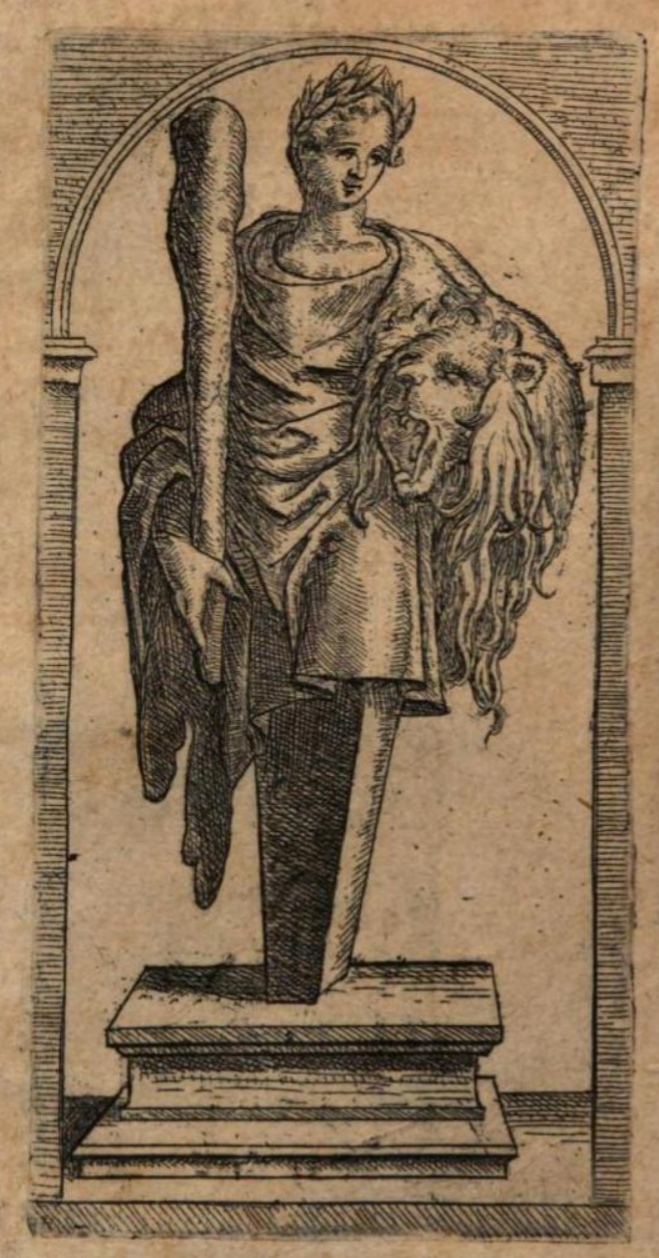
- Frontispiece of Hercules Prodicius by Stephanus Winandus Pighius
- Born: 28 April 1555; Cleves
- Died: 9 February 1575 (aged 19); Rome
- Buried: Santa Maria dell’Anima
- Noble family: La Marck
- Father: William, Duke of Jülich-Cleves-Berg
- Mother: Maria of Austria

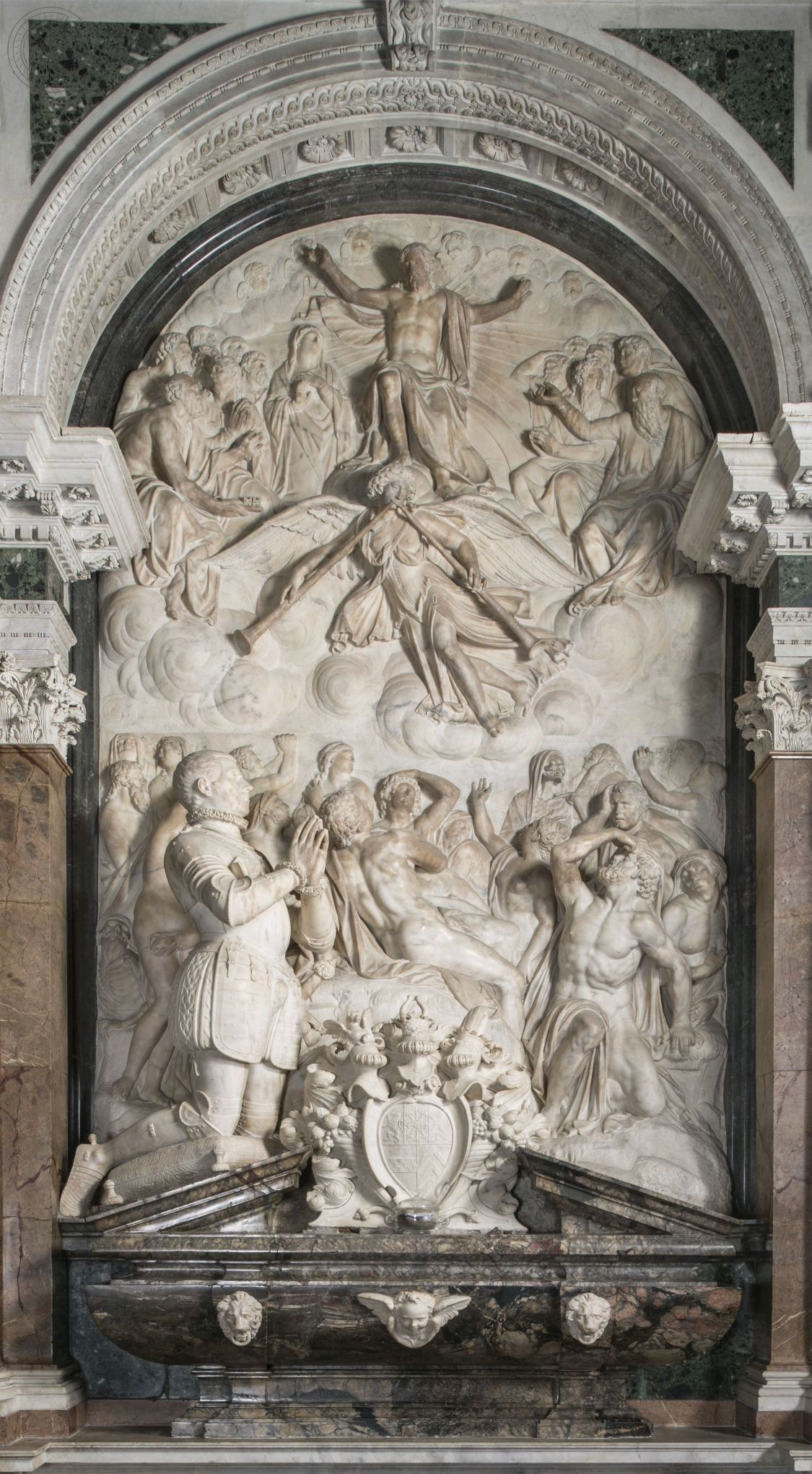
Funeral monument statue of Karl Friedrich

Karl Frederick of Jülich-Cleves-Berg (28 April 1555 in Cleves – 9 February 1575 in Rome), was Hereditary Prince of the United Duchies of Jülich-Cleves-Berg and the counties of Mark and Ravensberg.

== Life ==
Karl Frederick was the eldest son of Duke William the rich and his wife, Maria of Austria (1531-1581), a daughter of Emperor Ferdinand I. His early and unexpected death of smallpox at the age of 19 in Rome during a pilgrimage and Grand Tour left a deep mark in history. His death left his younger brother John William as heir apparent of the United Duchies.

However, John William had a weak health and mental problems and would die without an heir. This led to the War of the Jülich succession, which led to the territories being divided between Brandenburg-Prussia and Palatinate-Neuburg.

Karl Frederick's Dutch tutor Stephanus Winandus Pighius created a literary monument for his pupil in his Hercules Prodicius, published at the Plantin Press in Antwerp in 1587. This book describes the trip of Karl Frederick and Pighius through Italy. Because of its detailed descriptions it became the first tourist guide to Italy. In the book, Karl Frederick is described as a firm, fun-loving and highly intelligent young man. He was among the guests of honor at the ceremony in St. Peter's Basilica to open the Holy Year of 1575. Pope Gregory XIII was very attached to his guest, as he hoped that the young Prince would later have a favourable effect on the neighbouring Protestant countries. A week later, the Pope honoured his guest by giving him a consecrated sword and hat, an honor that was otherwise reserved for Kings. When Karl Frederick died five weeks later, Gregory XIII personally paid the cost of a royal funeral and an enormous funeral procession.

== Funeral monument ==
Karl Frederick was buried across from Pope Adrian VI, in the Santa Maria dell’Anima, the church in Rome of the Holy Roman Empire of the German nation. His magnificent grave monument was designed by his tutor Pighius, and executed by the sculptors Nicolas Mostaert and Gillis van den Vliete. It shows, among other things, a scene of the Last Judgement that cites in one of the male nudes the statue of Laocoön and His Sons discovered in 1506. It also includes a statue of the Duke praying on his knees. A second part of the monument, with the presentation of the consecrated sword and hat, now hangs in the vestibule of the church. The inscription there states that Karl Frederick had a precocious sense of piety and was brilliant despite his youth and knew many things and many languages.
