= Burgau =

- Town
- Coat of arms

- Location of Burgau within Günzburg district
- Interactive map of Burgau
- Location within Germany Location within Bavaria
- Coordinates: 48°25′56″N 10°24′25″E
- Country: Germany
- State: Bavaria
- Admin. region: Swabia
- District: Günzburg

Government
  - Mayor (2020–26): Martin Brenner (CSU)

Area
  - Total: 25.92 km^{2} (10.01 sq mi)
- Elevation: 462 m (1,516 ft)

Population (2025-12-31)
  - Total: 10,677
  - Density: 411.9/km^{2} (1,067/sq mi)
- Time zone: UTC+01:00 (CET)
  - Summer (DST): UTC+02:00 (CEST)
- Postal codes: 89331
- Dialling codes: 08222
- Vehicle registration: GZ
- Website: www.burgau.de

Burgau (German pronunciation: [ˈbʊʁɡaʊ]) is a town in the district of Günzburg in Swabia, Bavaria. Burgau lies on the river Mindel and has a population of 10,670 as of 2024.

== History ==
The territory around Burgau was originally part of the stem duchy of Swabia. The death of Conradin and the resulting extinction of the Hohenstaufen line in 1268 led to the collapse of the integrity of the duchy and its division into reichsfrei lands, after local nobles resisted the Habsburg Holy Roman Emperor Rudolph's attempts to annex the duchy. The Lords of Burgau are first found in documentary mention in 1147, as Herren von Burguo. Burgau was raised to a margraviate in 1212.

With the death of Margrave Henry III in 1301, the margravial line fell extinct and the Empire claimed the fief. Albert I of Germany transferred the feudal rights to his two sons, thereby permanently adding the territory to the Habsburg dominions, with Henry III's widow purchasing the allodial rights. Four different titles were awarded: that of allodial rights, Imperial feudal rights (German: Reichslehen), manorial rights (German: Grundherrschaft) and guardianship (German: Vogtei, usually translated as bailiwick).

The location of the castle produced latent tensions with the Bavarian Wittelsbachs, who coveted the margraviate to round off their territories. Their attempted purchase of the territory in 1418 was resisted by the Imperial Cities of Augsburg and Ulm, with the support of other Swabian cities. Burgau came to rely on the support of the Imperial Cities, along with the Bishopric of Augsburg and the Fugger lands to stem the Wittelsbachs' acquisitive desires, particularly after they won the land west of the Lech; see Swabian League.

Throughout the 14th century, the Habsburgs were compelled to mortgage the margraviate or its parts; the last such mortgage being to the Bishopric of Augsburg, ending in 1559. Further Austria fell to Emperor Ferdinand I in 1522, passing to his second son Ferdinand II, Archduke of Austria, on his death.

In the German Peasants' War in 1525, Burgau supported the Leipheimer Haufen against Ulm, but was defeated by the Swabian League. The city suffered badly during both the Thirty Years' War and the War of the Spanish Succession.

Ferdinand II's successor, his nephew Emperor Rudolph II, entrusted the margraviate to Charles von Österreich, Ferdinand II's second son by his morganatic wife Philippine Welser, daughter of a wealthy Augsburg burgher. Charles was the last holder of the margraviate, from 1609 to 1618; on his death, the land returned to the senior Austrian Habsburg line. When that archducal line expired, with the death of Sigismund Francis, the Viennese court took responsibility for the margraviate.

A significant Jewish community existed in Burgau from early medieval times to the beginning of the 17th century and reached its pinnacle in the 1500s. In 1617, after being accused of "excessive usury," the Jewish community was officially expelled.

In 1805, by the Peace of Pressburg, Napoléon forced a defeated Emperor Francis II to cede Further Austria to French allies on his abdication and the dissolution of the Holy Roman Empire, with Burgau passing to the new kingdom of Bavaria.

In September 1853, the Ulm–Augsburg railway was built as part of the Bavarian Maximilian's Railway (Bayerische Maximiliansbahn) through Burgau, with the station officially opening on 1 May 1854. Bavarian administrative reforms in 1862 established a court, a notary, and a tax office; the following year, a large fire resulted in the creation of a volunteer fire service.

Towards the end of World War II, two subcamps of Dachau concentration camp — one for men, and one for women — were established in Burgau. More than 1000 prisoners, including 500 Jewish women and girls from Poland and Hungary, were transported from Dachau, Bergen-Belsen, and Ravensbrück. They were forced to work in miserable conditions in an aircraft hangar in Scheppach Forest; 18 died and were buried in the Jewish cemetery in Ichenhausen. After the war, some 1600 Heimatvertriebene were resettled in Burgau.

Bavarian regional reforms in 1978 merged the previously independent municipalities of Oberknöringen, Unterknöringen, Großanhausen, Kleinanhausen and Limbach into Burgau.

== Politics ==
Since May 2022, the mayor has been Carlos Pinto (CSU).

The city council has 20 members, currently distributed as below.

Sitzverteilung bei der Kommunalwahl	2002	2008
United Free Voters	7	5
Christian Social Union	6	5
Christian Voters' Community	3	3
Social Democratic Party	3	3
Free Democratic Party and Free Bürger	1	2
Active Bürger of Burgau	–	2

Burgau also has two partnerships with other towns:

- Burgau, Styria, Austria — officially twinned since 1982, but informal partnerships for a decade before that.
- Knöringen, Rhineland-Palatinate, Germany — informal partnerships, particularly with the municipalities of Ober- and Unterknöringen.

== Attractions and culture ==
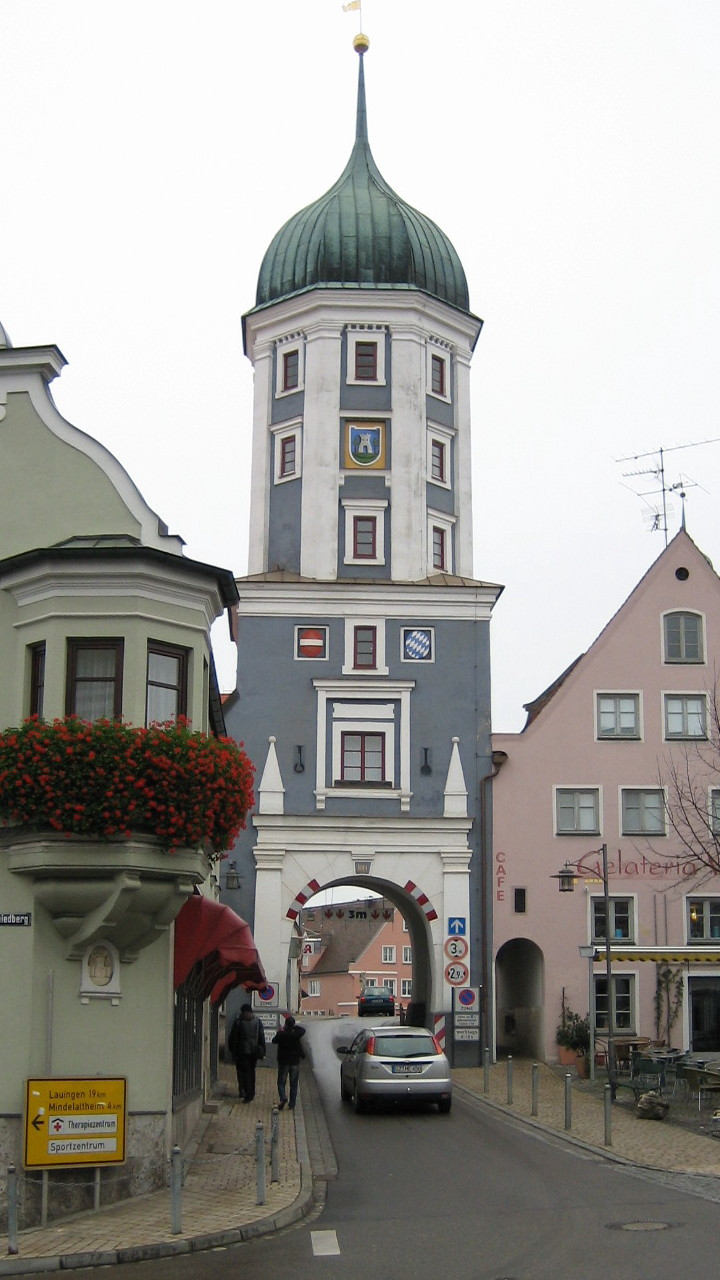
Blockhausturm

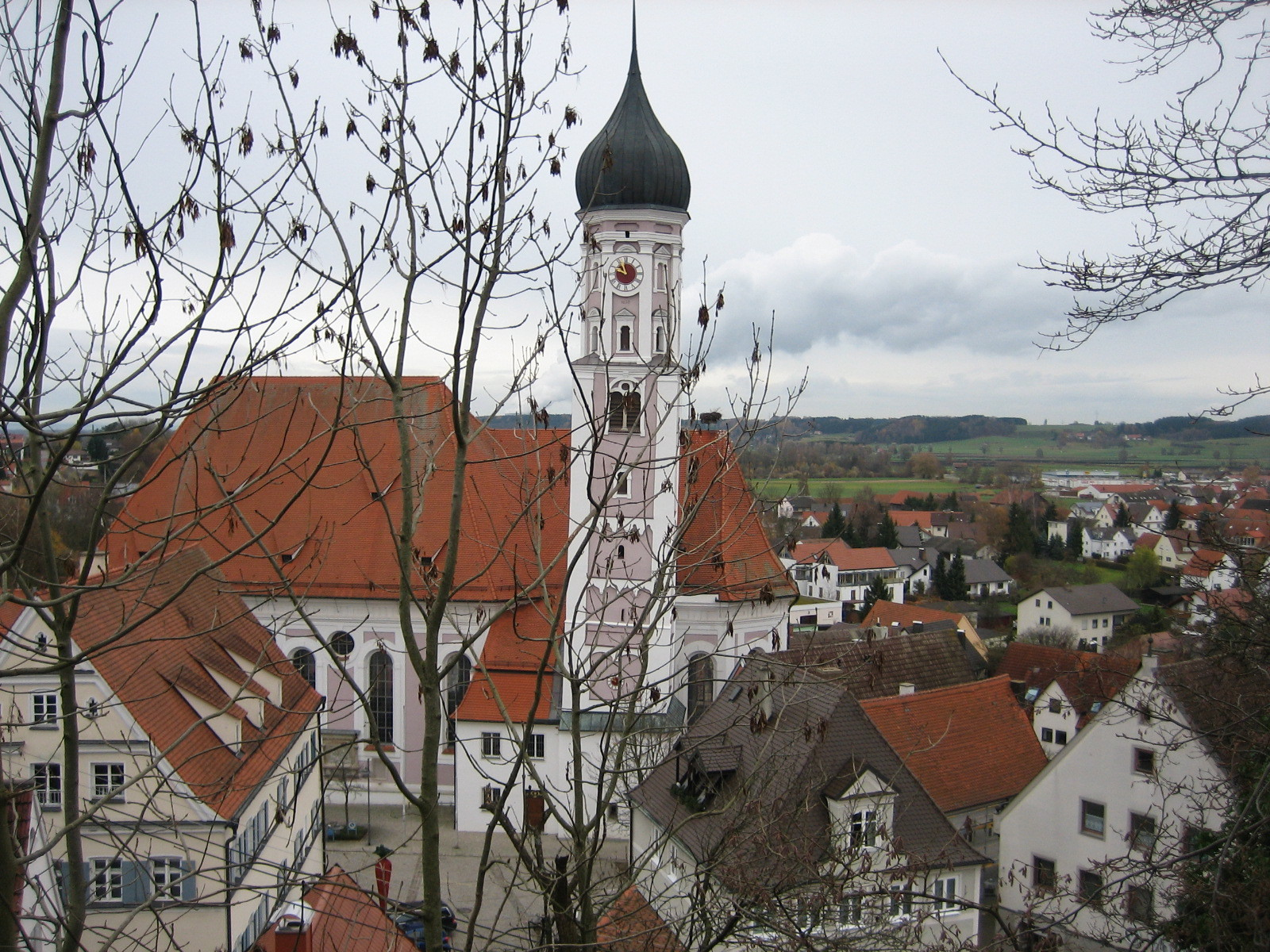
Parish church

Attractions in Burgau include:

- the only remaining town gate, the Blockhausturm, built in 1614
- a fountain in honour of the Blessed Virgin Mary with a figure designed by Franz Schäfferle in 1696 designed, 1731
- the chapel of St Leonard, built in 1667 with a Baroque façade
- the town parish church, built between 1788 and 1791
- the castle, high above the Mindeltal
- the former Capuchin monastery. In its apse there was Leonardo da Vinci's Madonna of the Carnation, now in Munich's Alte Pinakothek
- the oldest domestic house in Burgau, which dates from the Thirty Years' War

In 1997, the city celebrated the 850-year anniversary of its first documentary mention in a complex Historischen Fest. In a slightly reduced form, further festivities were celebrated in 2001 and 2005 for the 700th anniversary of joining Further Austria and the 200th anniversary of joining Bavaria, respectively. The next Historic Festival is scheduled for July 2009.

Since the Thirty Years' War, there had been an annual custom of the Kinderbrotspeisung (literally: feeding children bread); this custom was revived by Albert Vogele in the 1950s. Now on Rosenmontag, disguised as a town soldier, his son Drummer Albert leads the children out of their schools and through the streets with his drum. The children call out traditional carnival sayings in front of the shops, demanding the shopkeepers distribute presents. This is the start of a day-long street carnival, which attracts thousands of spectators annually.

== Transport ==
The town has a railway station, Burgau (Schwab), on the Ulm–Augsburg line.

== Sons and daughters of the city ==
- Anton Eggstein (1780–1819), brewer and deputy of the first Bavarian Landtag
- Andreas Mayer (footballer, born 1972), footballer (soccer)
- Otto Meyer (1926–2014), educator and politician (CSU)
- Sven Müller (born 1980), Football (soccer) player
- Hans Reichhart (born 1982), politician (CSU)

== See also ==
- Günzburg (district)
