= Gillis van den Vliete =

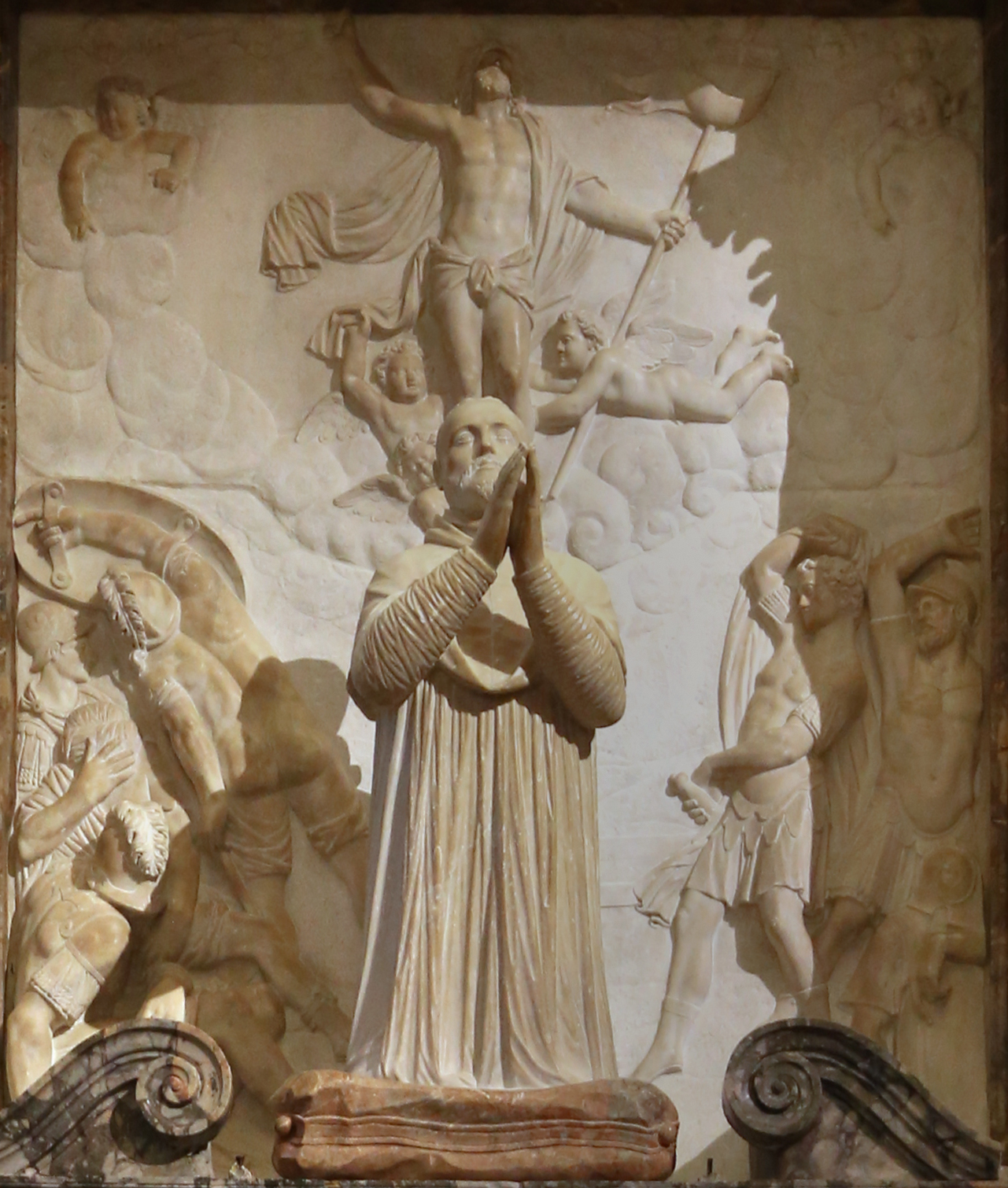
Tomb of Margrave Andrew of Burgau

Gillis van den Vliete known in Italy as Egìdio della Riviera (Mechelen, c. 1535 – buried on 4 September 1602 in Rome) was a Flemish sculptor, restorer of ancient sculptures and antique dealer. His active career was spent in Italy, mostly in Rome. He produced both religious and secular sculpture including garden ornaments and tomb monuments. On some large projects he collaborated with other sculptors such as Nicolaes Mostaert, a Flemish sculptor active in Italy at the same time. His works are executed in the Northern Renaissance style which he had been trained in, in his native Flanders, but also intimate the advent of Baroque sculpture.

== Life ==
The biographical details about van den Vliete are scarce. It is believed that he was born in Mechelen. As in a contract signed in Rome in 1597, he is referred to as 'Egidio della Riviera Mechinense'. Nothing is known about his training. He is first recorded in 1567, when he is part of a group of Flemish artists working in Rome.

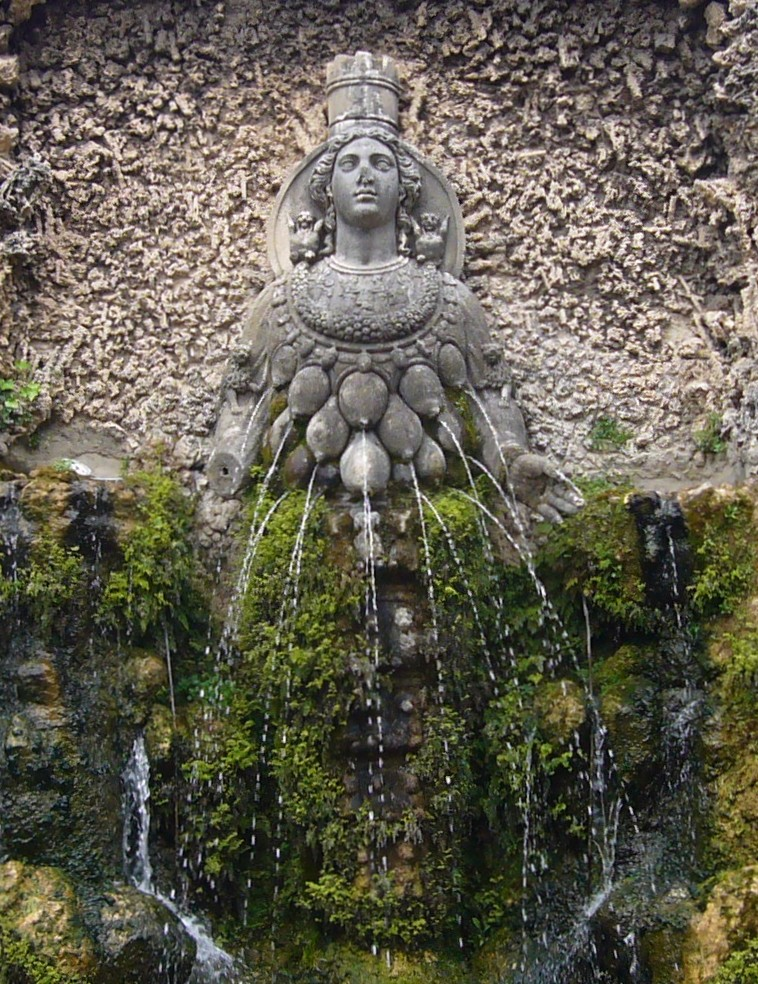
Fountain of Mother Nature

He was a restorer of antique sculptures. Like many other Flemish sculptors in Italy, he also traded in antique statues. He was highly regarded and received various commissions. He made secular commissions such as the Fontana Della Madre Natura (Fountain of Mother Nature) made in 1568 for the garden of the Villa d'Este, a 16th-century villa in Tivoli, near Rome. He also executed various large-scale commissions in Roman churches. He created most of his known works in the Santa Maria dell'Anima in Rome. This shows that he was able to establish a long-term relationship with some of the leading figures at this Roman church. Some of these works were created in collaboration with Nicolas Mostaert with whom he may have shared a workshop.

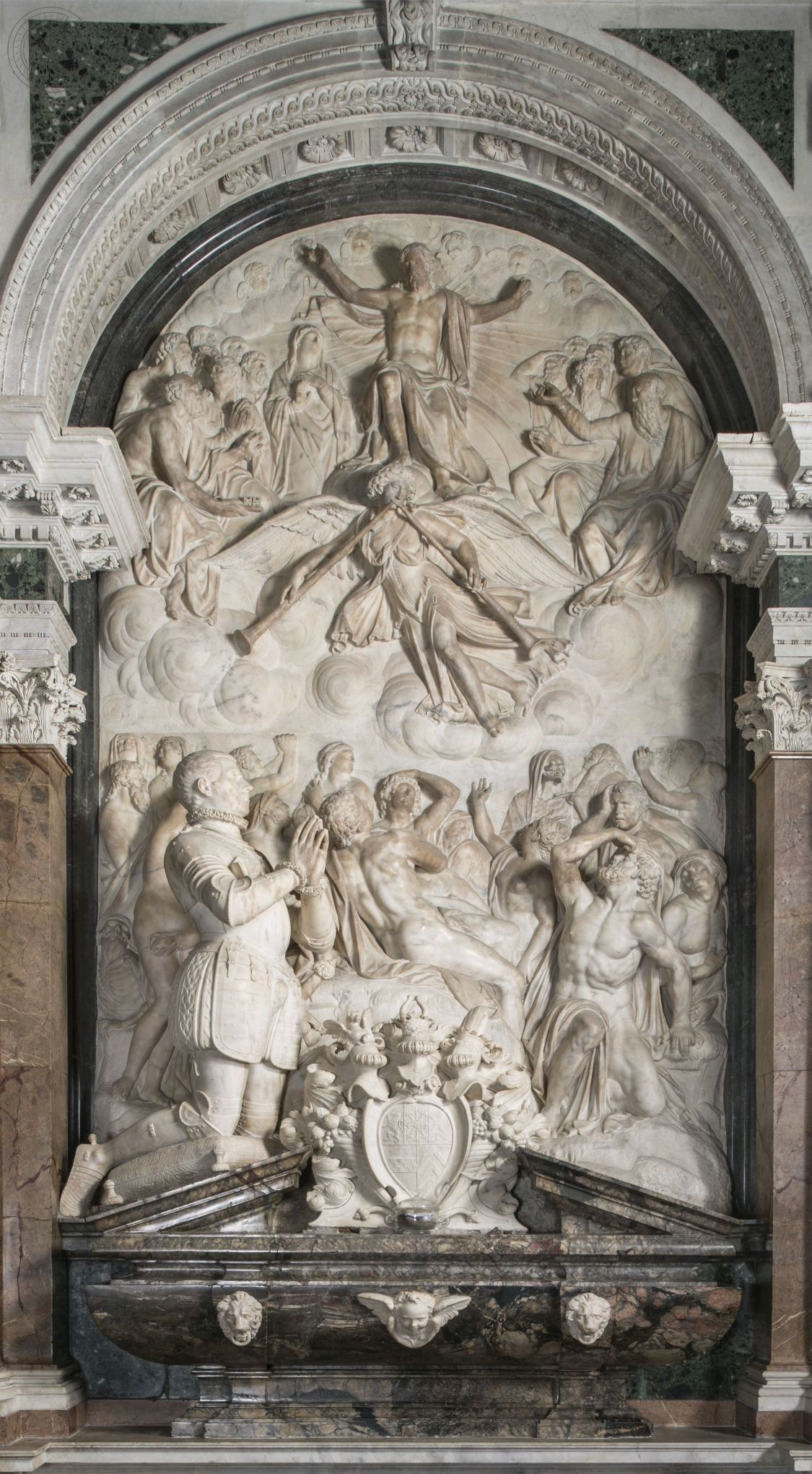
Funeral monument for Karl Friedrich of Jülich-Cleves-Berg

He married and had various children in the period from 1574 to 1597. His son Pieter van den Vliete, known as Pietro della Riviera, was born in Rome likely in 1583. Pietro was also active as a sculptor and was the heir of his father. Gillis van den Vliete was admitted on 14 June 1579 as a member of the Pontificia Insigne Accademia di Belle Arti e Letteratura dei Virtuosi al Pantheon, a pontifical academy in Rome established for the purpose of studying, cultivating and perfecting the fine arts. He owed this recognition to the creation of the funerary monument of Duke Karl Friedrich of Jülich-Cleves-Berg in the Santa Maria dell'Anima. He was also a member of the Università dei Marmorari, Rome's sculptors' guild. Van den Vliete was active as an appraiser of the sculptural works of other sculptors. An example is the case of the work on the horses at Monte Cavallo executed from 1589 to 1590 by Flaminio Vacca, Pietro Paolo Olivieri and Lodovico Sormanno. He and his colleague Giovanni Battista di Bianchi provided an estimate in the amount of 2250 scudi for the work done. The papal office did not accept the estimate and reduced the amount to 1800 scudi.

In 1597, Gillis entered into a contract with the Flemish architect and painter Wenceslas Cobergher for the decoration of a chapel dedicated to the Holy Spirit in the Santa Maria in Vallicella, where the founder of this chapel, Didacodel Campo, the Pope's physician, had recently been buried. In the contract, he is called 'Egidio della Riviera Mechinense' (of Mechelen). He was assisted in this commission by his son Pietro. Pietro was still living in 1623, according to a contract he made that year for a house in the Porta Pia.

He died in Rome, where he was buried on 4 September 1602, in San Lorenzo in Lucina.

== Work ==
Van den Vliete is mainly known for his monumental projects and bas-reliefs created for the churches in Rome. Various works have been attributed to him based on contemporary documents, such as contracts or payments for commissions. As he collaborated on some of his commissions with other sculptors, his exact contribution to such works cannot always be determined and art historians are not unanimous in their attributions. The identification of his oeuvre has remained problematic. His work shows his roots in Northern Mannerism and a development towards a more Baroque approach.

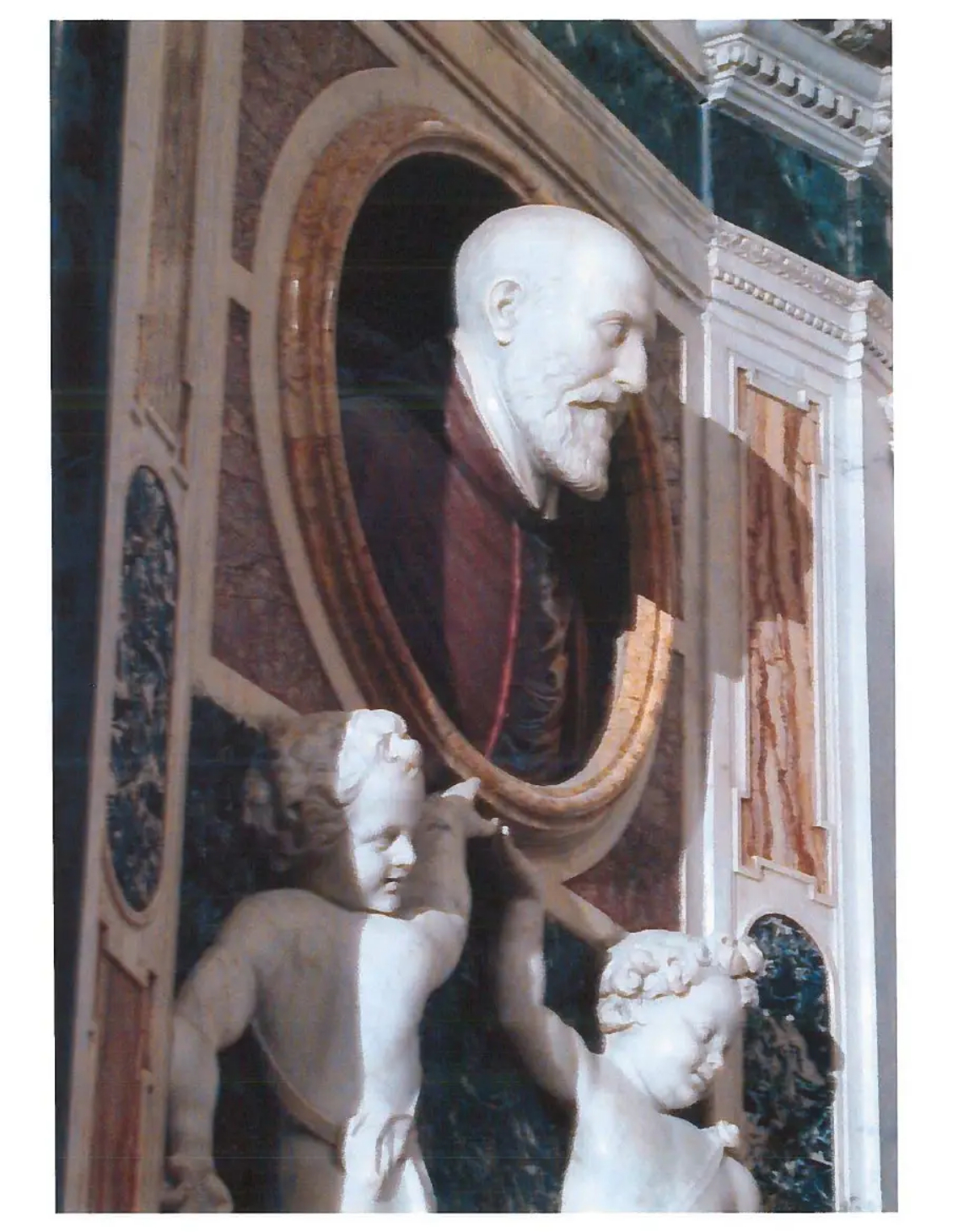
Funeral monument of Cardinal Francisco de Toledo

In the Santa Maria dell'Anima, in Rome, he and Mostaert collaborated from 1576 to 1579 on marble reliefs for the tomb of Duke Karl Friedrich of Jülich-Cleves-Berg. This monument was designed by the Duke's tutor Stephanus Winandus Pighius. The monument was dismantled in 1750 and the remaining parts of it are now located at various locations in the church. The principal section shows, among other things, a scene of the Last Judgement, with some male nudes that cite the famous Laocoön and His Sons sculpture discovered in 1506. According to Baglione, the central relief with the Last Judgment was flanked by statues of religion and faith on the right and left, all set in columns, niches, frontons; above a bas-relief with the presentation of a staff of honor to the Duke and two putti to the side. On a sarcophagus, kneeling, was a statue of the Duke. The Last Judgment and the statue of the Duke are still there. The relief of the Last Judgment was worked in two parts. The lower part and the figure of the duke are by Mostard. In niches there are Wisdom and Christian Love, coming from a tomb of Cardinal Andrew of Austria. The second part of the tomb, a relief with the scene of the consecration of the consecrated sword by Gregory XIII, hangs today in the vestibule of the church. The inscription on it states that Karl Friedrich had a precocious sense of piety, was brilliant despite his youth and knew many things and many languages.

Van den Vliete and Mostaert collaborated round 1600 on a marble funerary monument for Cardinal and Margrave Andrew of Burgau (Andreas von Österreich) in the Santa Maria dell'Anima. The funerary monument of Count Egon von Fürstenberg in the Santa Maria dell'Anima, for which he was paid 360 scudi, was his work alone.

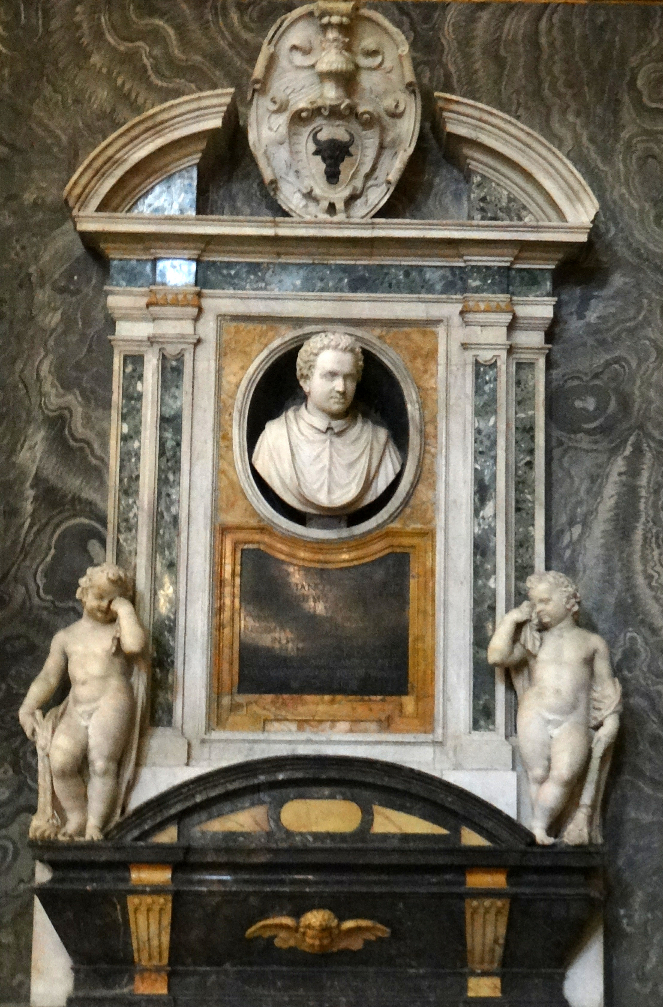
Funeral monument of Maximilian von Pernstein

He also made works in other Roman churches such as the Santa Maria Maggiore and the Santa Maria in Vallicella. In the past two bas-reliefs on the funeral monument of Pope Pius V, in the Santa Maria Maggiore were attributed to van den Vliete. although some art historians have attributed these to Mostaert: one representing the pontiff giving a standard to Admiral Marcantonio Colonna, at the time of his departure for the battle of Lepanto (1571), where he commanded twelve galleys and the other showing the same pontiff handing the baton of command to the Count of Santa Fiore before his departure for France at the head of an army of the Holy See. In the same church, he has been traditionally credited with creating for the funeral monument of Pope Sixtus V, two bas-reliefs, one having as its subject the canonisation of Saint Didacus of Alcalá and the other, the pontiff's deputy sending Cardinal Cinzio Aldobrandini to Germany as a legate. The Coronation of Pius V in this monument is also attributed to van den Vliete. A further tomb monument in the same church has been attributed to van den Vliete. It is the tomb monument for Cardinal Francisco de Toledo, which he created in 1598 after a design by Giacomo della Porta. The monument is similar to other designs by della Porta in the church. The portrait of Toledo is similar to that of Sixtus V in the same church.

It has been suggested that he was responsible for the Funeral monument for Maximilian von Pernstein in the basilica Santa Maria Maggiore. Von Pernstein was a Bohemian who served as papal chamberlain to Pope Clement VIII in Rome. His tomb was in the choir, close to the tomb of Pope Hadrian VI in the right aisle of the basilica leaning against the wall between the Patrizi chapel and the entrance to the baptistery. This was likely its original location. The tomb monument was completed in 1597.

For the garden of the Villa d'Este in Tivoli van den Vliete created the Fontana Della Madre Natura which included a statue of Diana of Ephesus, the nature goddess. Sculpted in 1568, the statue was originally part of the Fountain of the Organ (Fontana dell’Organo). It was moved in the 17th century to another location as it was regarded as too overly pagan. The main element of the small fountain, surrounded by a luxuriant espalier of roses, is a statue of Artemis of Ephesus, which van den Vliete executed probably after a design by Pirro Ligorio or after an ancient statue formerly in the Farnese collection. The statue is surmounted by an arch with limestone concretions and from Diana Efesia's multiple breasts water gushes back into the basin below.

A few other sculptures have been attributed to the artist, including a Lying warrior (Museo Bardini ) and a Andromeda (Sotheby's 8 July 2005 London lot 75). The latter is clearly inspired by classical sculpture which is tempered by a naturalism in the form and composition. Van den Vliete also created the Tritons in the Fontana del Moro in the Piazza Navona. The marble basin of the Fontana del Moro was made in 1575 by Giacomo della Porta and was decorated with groups of tritons, dragons and masks by 16th-century artists including van den Vliete, Taddeo Landini, Simone Moschini and Giacobbe Silla Longhi to designs by della Porta himself, which were replaced in 1874 with copies by Luigi Amici.
