= Hambach Castle =

Medieval castle in Germany

Coordinates: 49°19′29″N 8°7′6″E

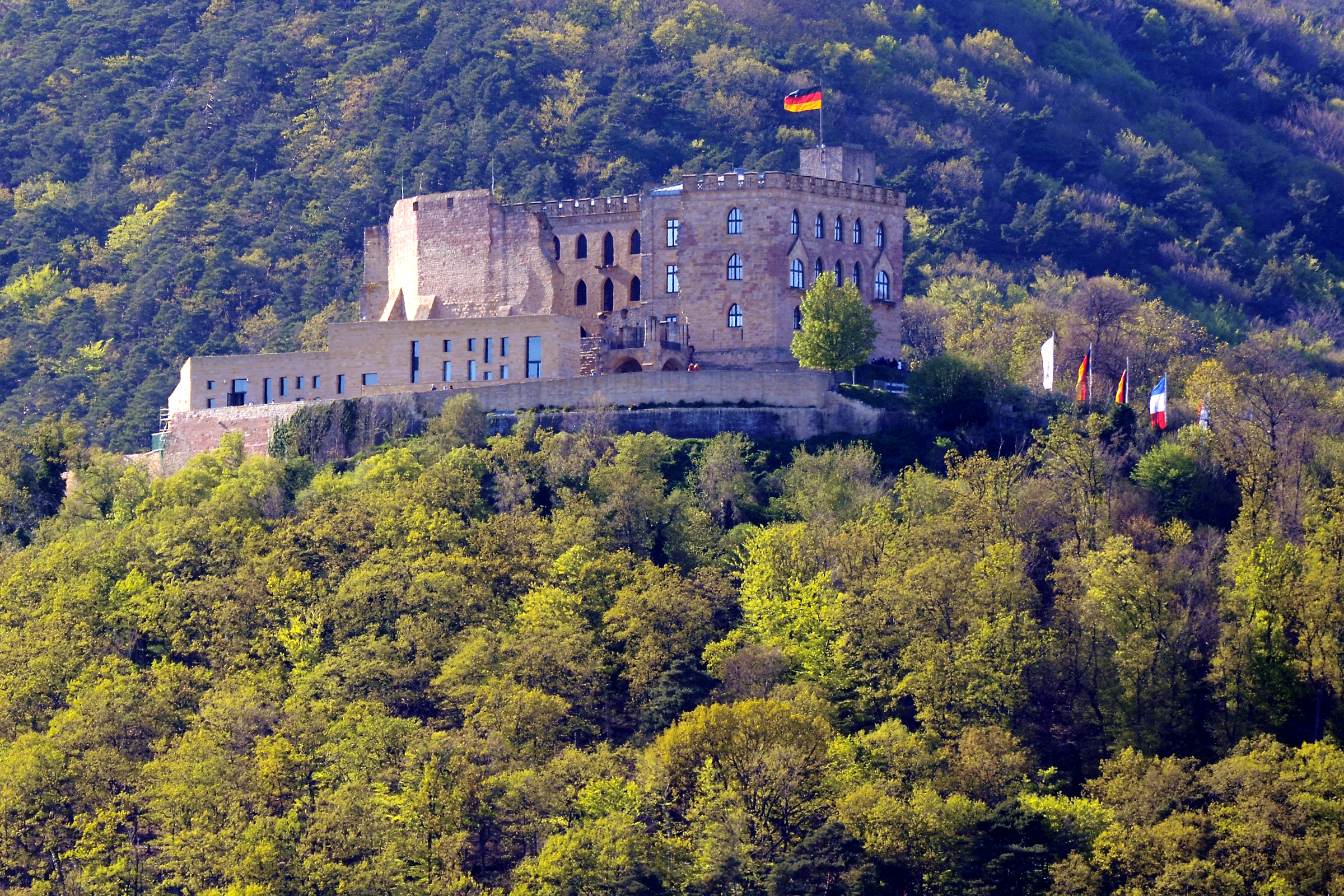
Hambach Castle

Hambach Castle (German: Hambacher Schloss) is a castle near the urban district Hambach of Neustadt an der Weinstraße in Rhineland-Palatinate, Germany. It is considered a symbol of the German democracy movement because of the Hambacher Fest which was held there in 1832.

== Location ==
Hambach Castle is located on the mountain Schlossberg (literally translated "Castle mountain"; elevation: 325m) in the eastern outskirts of the Palatine Forest. The estate ruled both as a protection castle and as a robber baron castle over the trade roads and the northern route of the Anterior Palatinate section of the Way of St. James.

== History ==
=== Before 1832 ===
Archaeological finds prove that the area of Hambach Castle was used in late Roman times. In late Carolingian dynasty times and Ottonian dynasty times a castle of refuge was built there. Portions remain in front of and under the outer ring wall.

Probably in the first half of the 11th century, a new castle named Kästenburg (translated in the Palatinate dialect as the "chestnut castle") was built inside the former estate. It got its name because of the surrounding magnificent sweet chestnut forests. There is little known about its early history; there are speculations without any proof that it was founded as an Imperial Castle (Reichsburg) or that Emperor Henry IV had started his Walk to Canossa there in 1076. The only thing certain is that between 1090 and 1104 bishop Johann I of Speyer signed over the estate together with Castle Meistersel to the Bishopric of Speyer, which stayed the owner to the end of the 18th century.

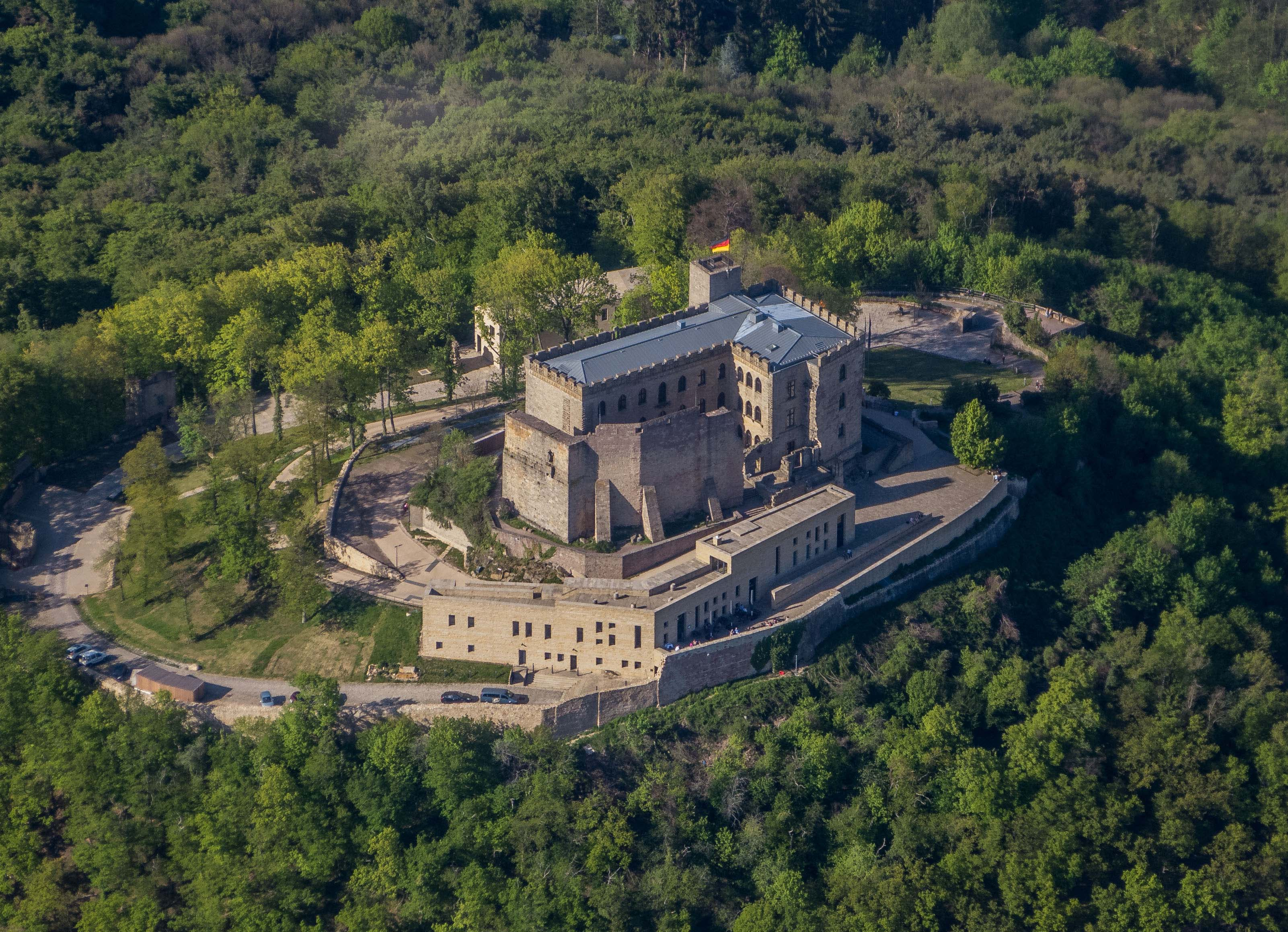
Aerial view of the castle

The big estate was said to be one of the most important facilities of the Bishopric of Speyer in the late Middle Ages. This is indicated by the many residencies of the bishops since 1180. Despite this the first "Burgmannen" primary were known as Imperial Ministeriales and not as commissionaires of the church, especially the first one, Burkhard of Kästenburg, who is provably in the imperial service from 1154 to 1186. His brother Trushard of Kästenburg, proven 1178–1201, had a brilliant career at the court of Henry VI.

The descendants of Trushard had no connection to the Kästenburg. Other houses of "Burgmannen" took place here, among them since 1256 the ministerial family Schnittlauch of Kästenburg, the Earls of Zweibrücken (1284) and the Earls of Veldenz (1311).

Especially during the 13th century, larger building projects took place. Nikolaus I was consecrated as Bishop of Speyer in the castle chapel on July 12, 1388. More construction was done at the end of the 14th century and in the second half of the 15th century by the bishops Nikolaus I and Matthias I. The castle was the home for the Episcopalian document archive at the end of the 14th century.

Later the importance of the Kästenburg declined, one reason being the erection of the new estate Hanhofen after 1414/20 (later Marientraut). In 1466 the Kästenburg was the property of the Bishopric of Speyer, which Prince-elector Friedrich I protected for Bishop Matthias. An inventory taken one or two years before shows the castle still decently equipped.

During the German Peasants' War in 1525 the Kästenburg was occupied and looted, but not destroyed, by the "Nußdorfer Bauernhaufen" (literally translated: Nußdorf peasant bunch). In 1552 it was conquered and burned down by troops of Margrave and mercenary-leader Albrecht Alcibiades of Brandenburg-Kulmbach to whom a tribute of 150,000 gulden was denied. Bishop Marquard of Speyer, who was in office from 1560 to 1581, only arranged a very provisional rebuilding of the residential buildings and made the ruin the seat of a forester.

The former fortress was undamaged during the Thirty Years' War, but during War of the Palatinian Succession in September 1688, the abandoned castle was destroyed by French soldiers. It was once more provisionally restored from 1701 to 1703.

In 1797 the castle was declared to be French government property. In 1816 after the Congress of Vienna the ruin became the property of the Kingdom of Bavaria together with the complete "linksrheinische Pfalz" (literally translated: left-Rhine Palatinate). A short time later citizens of Neustadt gave the worthless estate to the Bavarian King Maximilian II as a "wedding present". Because of this, the castle is also called "Maxburg" in colloquial language. In 1844 Bavaria began to rebuild the castle in neo-gothic style, August von Voit had provided the plans.

=== Hambacher Fest ===
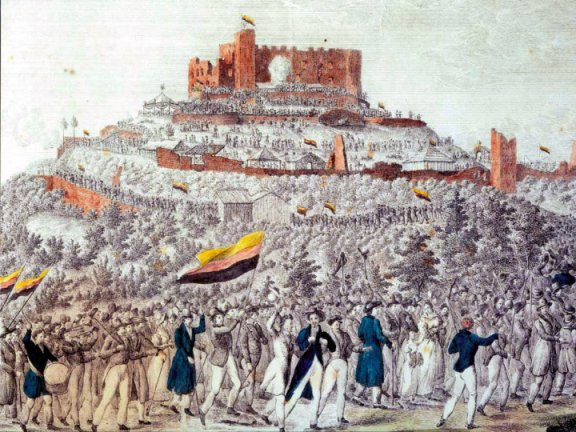
The rally to Hambach Castle 1832 with flags in gold-red-black (inverse color order of the present German flag)

In the context of the Hambacher Fest of 1832 the then-ruined castle was the focal point of the discontent of the Palatinate people over the repressive measures of the Bavarian administration which had been in office since 1816. The administration had retracted important rights which had been given to the people by French Revolution troops (governing 1797/98-1815). Since the Hambacher Fest, Hambach Castle has been considered a symbol of democracy.

=== Modern history ===
Before the 150th anniversary of the Hambacher Fest in 1982, the castle was completely restored for about 12 million DM (about 6 million €). During a further renovation period 2006-07 before the 175th anniversary in 2007, the castle was closed to visitors for one year. Today the national memorial is a museum and convention centre with about 200,000 visitors per year. During the whole year events and receptions of the federal state Rhineland-Palatinate, the District Bad Dürkheim and the city Neustadt an der Weinstraße take place here. A VIP guest in May 1985 was US President Ronald Reagan with his speech "an die Jugend der Welt" (to the youth of the world). Also Presidents of Germany mostly connect their inaugural visit in Rhineland-Palatinate with a visit to this historic site.

A mention of the "Maxburg" evokes a sense of affinity among students and academics: it is considered a stone symbol of freedom and fraternity especially among members of students' fraternities.

Since 1969 the castle has been the property of the - then newly created - District Bad Dürkheim. In 2002 it became part of a new charity: its owners are now the federal state of Rhineland-Palatinate, the Bezirksverband Pfalz, the District Bad Dürkheim and the city of Neustadt an der Weinstraße. The charity is supported financially by the Federal Republic of Germany.
