= Jettingen-Scheppach =

- Municipality
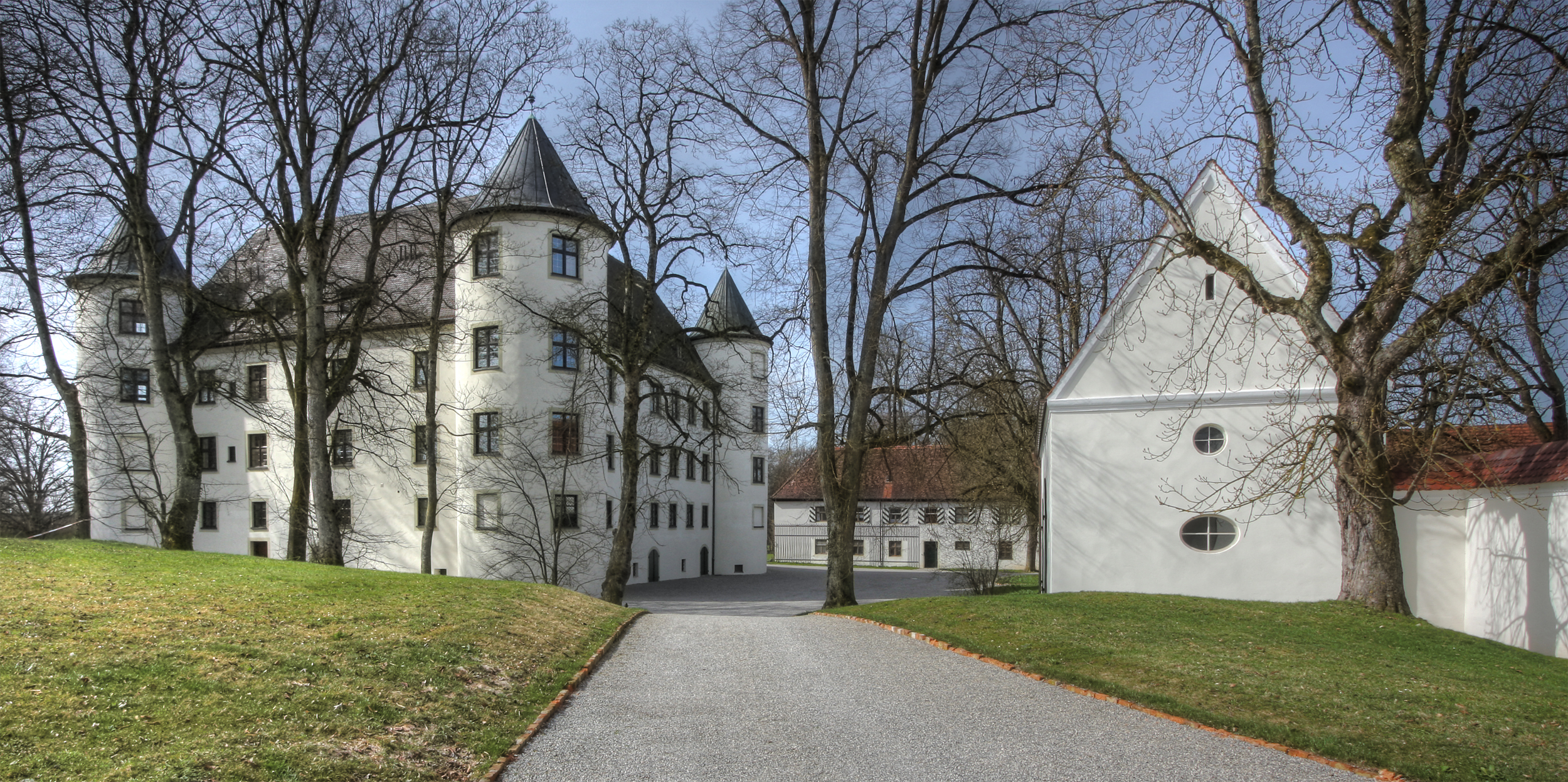
- Jettingen-Scheppach, former Stauffenberg-Castle

- Coat of arms

- Location of Jettingen-Scheppach within Günzburg district
- Interactive map of Jettingen-Scheppach
- Location within Germany Location within Bavaria
- Coordinates: 48°23′N 10°26′E
- Country: Germany
- State: Bavaria
- Admin. region: Schwaben
- District: Günzburg

Government
  - Mayor (2020–26): Christoph Böhm

Area
  - Total: 54.12 km^{2} (20.90 sq mi)
- Elevation: 470 m (1,540 ft)

Population (2025-12-31)
  - Total: 6,976
  - Density: 128.9/km^{2} (333.8/sq mi)
- Time zone: UTC+01:00 (CET)
  - Summer (DST): UTC+02:00 (CEST)
- Postal codes: 89343
- Dialling codes: 0 82 25
- Vehicle registration: GZ
- Website: www.jettingen-scheppach.de

Jettingen-Scheppach (German pronunciation: [ˈjɛtɪŋən ˈʃɛpax]) is a market town in the Günzburg Landkreis in the Schwaben (Swabia) Regierungsbezirk in Bavaria. It lies between Ulm and Augsburg. Its population as of 1 December 2005 was 7,044.

== Politics ==
Jettingen-Scheppach's first mayor is Christoph Böhm, elected in March 2020.

=== Municipality council ===
All together, the municipality council (Gemeinderat) has 21 seats, which as of the last communal election on 16 March 2014 are distributed thus:

- CSU: 8 seats
- Free Independent Voter Municipality (FUW): 6 seats
- Young Citizens: 6 seats

== Economy and infrastructure ==
=== Transport ===
Jettingen-Scheppach is conveniently located at the Burgau junction on Autobahn A 8 (Stuttgart-Munich section). The borough of Jettingen has a railway station on the line between Ulm and Augsburg. There are hourly regional trains to Ulm (travel time 38 minutes) and Augsburg (28 to 37 minutes), as well as trains every other hour to Munich (78 minutes).

=== Twinnings ===
The borough of Freihalden in Jettingen-Scheppach has been twinned with the French pilgrimage town of Ars-sur-Formans since 1976. Jettingen-Scheppach has also been twinned with the Hungarian municipality of Csolnok since 1992.

== Personalities ==
=== People born in the town ===
- Johann Ernst Eberlin (1702–1762), composer and organist
- Oberst Claus Schenk Graf von Stauffenberg (1907–1944), Wehrmacht officer in the Second World War and member of the 20 July Plot
- Dominikus Böhm (1880–1955), architect
