= Ulm–Augsburg railway =

Railway line in Bavaria and Baden-Württemberg, Germany

Augsburg–Ulm railway
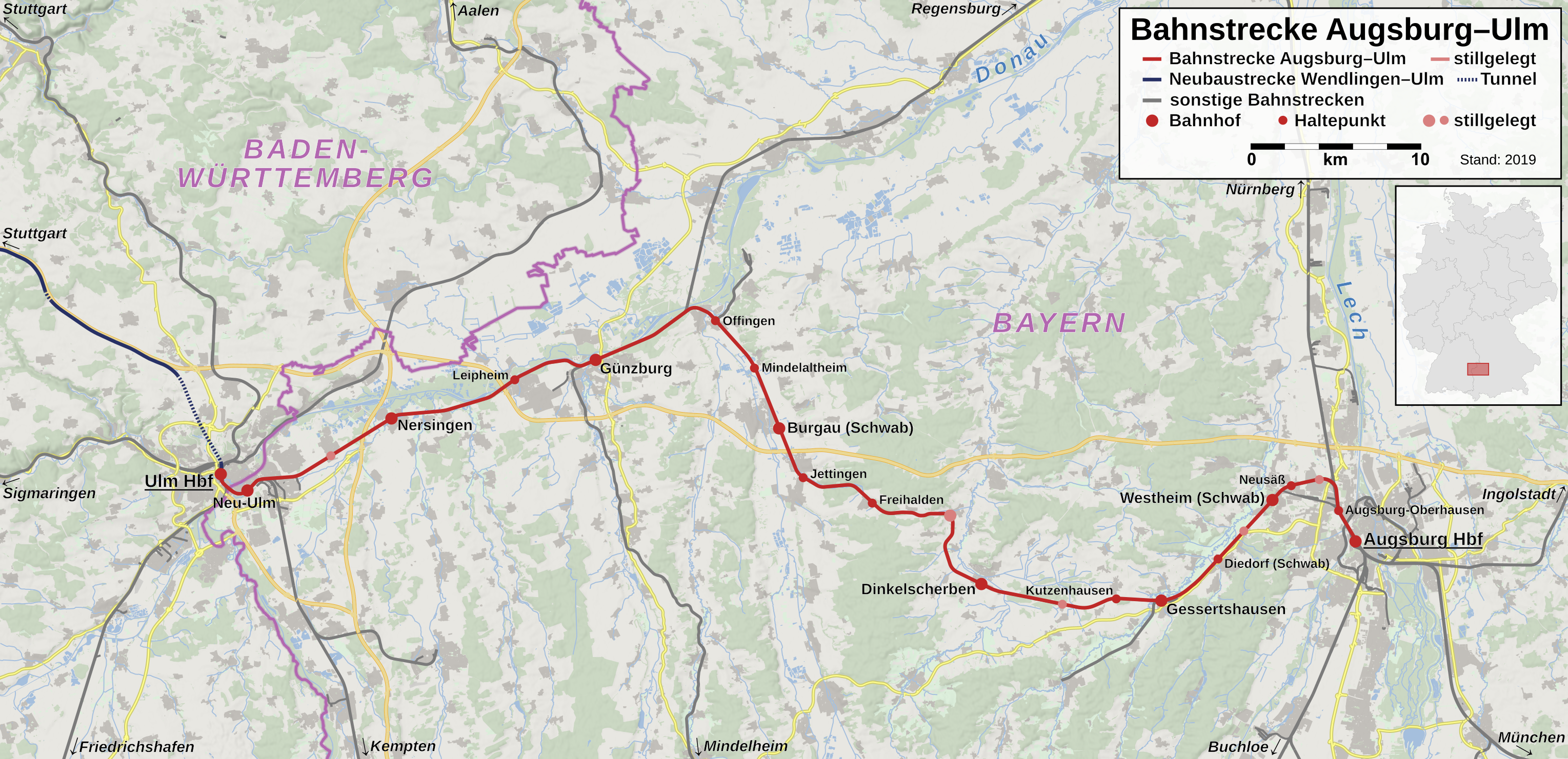

Overview
- Owner: DB Netz
- Line number: 5302

Service
- Route number: 980

Technical
- Line length: 85.0 km (52.8 mi)
- Number of tracks: 2
- Track gauge: 1,435 mm (4 ft 8 1/2 in) standard gauge
- Electrification: 15 kV/16.7 Hz AC catenary
- Operating speed: 200 km/h (125 mph)

The Ulm–Augsburg line is a German railway line. It was constructed as part of the Bavarian Maximilian's Railway. It was built for the Royal Bavarian State Railways as part of the east-west connection between Neu-Ulm in the west via Augsburg, Munich and Rosenheim to the Austrian border at Kufstein and Salzburg in the east.

== History ==
The line was constructed as part of the Bavarian Maximilian Railway (German:Bayerische Maximiliansbahn), named after Maximilian II, king of Bavaria from 1848 to 1864. In 1851, it was decided to build a line connecting the German states and Italy via the Brenner Pass and via Salzburg towards Vienna and the Semmering Pass. It promised good traffic flows to and from the Austrian Adriatic port at Trieste. Appropriate conventions were agreed with the Kingdom of Württemberg and with the Austrian government in 1851. The Munich–Augsburg line, which had been opened by the Munich–Augsburg Railway Company (München-Augsburger Eisenbahn-Gesellschaft) in 1839 and 1840 and nationalised in 1846 was included in the new line.

The line connected to the Württemberg Southern Railway in Ulm and ran for 84 kilometers to Augsburg.

=== Construction ===
The 83.7 km line from Augsburg to Ulm was opened in four sections:

- 1 May 1854 – Mitte Donaubrücke Ulm–Neu-Ulm, 1.3 km.
- 26 September 1853 – Neu-Ulm–Burgau, 38.1 km.
- 1 May 1854 – Burgau–Dinkelscherben, 17.9 km.
- 26 September 1853 – Dinkelscherben–Augsburg, 26.4 km.

== The line today ==
The line is a major traffic axis. Every hour or two Intercity-Express and InterCity trains run from Munich via Augsburg and Ulm to Stuttgart and from there to various other destinations.

=== Ulm–Augsburg upgraded line ===
The line between Ulm and Augsburg is part of the Stuttgart–Augsburg new and upgraded line project. Eventually this line should be part of the Magistrale for Europe from Paris via Strasbourg, Stuttgart and Ulm to Munich, Salzburg and Vienna.
