= Offingen =

- Municipality
- Coat of arms

- Location of Offingen within Günzburg district
- Interactive map of Offingen
- Location within Germany Location within Bavaria
- Coordinates: 48°28′N 10°22′E
- Country: Germany
- State: Bavaria
- Admin. region: Schwaben
- District: Günzburg
- Municipal assoc.: Offingen

Government
  - Mayor (2020–26): Thomas Wörz (SPD)

Area
  - Total: 14.91 km^{2} (5.76 sq mi)
- Elevation: 440 m (1,440 ft)

Population (2025-12-31)
  - Total: 4,365
  - Density: 292.8/km^{2} (758.2/sq mi)
- Time zone: UTC+01:00 (CET)
  - Summer (DST): UTC+02:00 (CEST)
- Postal codes: 89362
- Dialling codes: 08224
- Vehicle registration: GZ
- Website: www.offingen.de

Offingen (German pronunciation: [ˈɔfɪŋən]) is a municipality in the Swabian administrative district Günzburg in Bavaria in Germany. As of 2023, Offingen a population of 4,429.

Offingen lies in the Donauried between Ulm and Donauwörth on the Danube and Mindel. The Ulm–Augsburg railway line crosses the town. Neuoffingen station was an important interchange for decades.

== History ==
=== Offingen and Landstrost ===
"Offingen is, as can be derived from the name ending -ingen, the foundation of an Alemannic clan. The place name is derived from a clan leader Offo. The village developed as a street village at the intersection of the Roman road from Günzburg to Augsburg with the valley path leading along the Kammeltal. The village was first mentioned in a document dated 4 September 1186, in which Pope Urban III confirmed, among other things, that it was owned by the Augsburg bishop Udalschalk." At that time, the local government was exercised by Augsburg ministers. One of these ministerials was Konrad Schoberlin, whose gift of goods from the year 1209 has given an early mention of the town.

At the beginning of the 14th century, Offingen became part of the margraviate of Burgau together with the neighbouring castle Landstrost by an area exchange. The town and its citizens were then pledged several times to secure monetary claims against creditors. From 1380, the lords of Westernach appeared in Offingen over such pledged possessions and partly also fief possessions. In 1518, Eustachius von Westernach sold his fief and pledged property to the lords of the Stain zu Rechtenstein at Reisensburg. Around 1550, they found themselves in an economic emergency and sold the Offingen estate to the lords of Schellenberg zu Hüfingen in 1599. However, they also became indebted with the property and transferred the fiefdoms back to the barons of Freyberg-Eisenberg in Haldenwang in 1659, who held the local sovereignty until the redemption of the feudal rights in the 19th century.

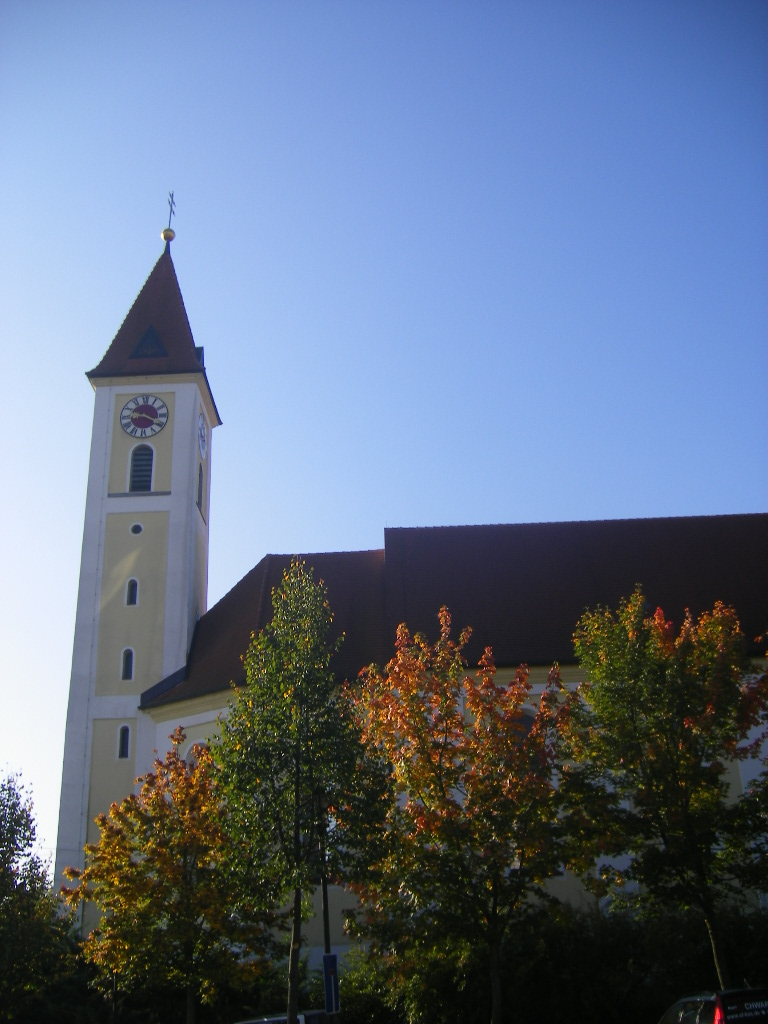
Saint George's church, Offingen

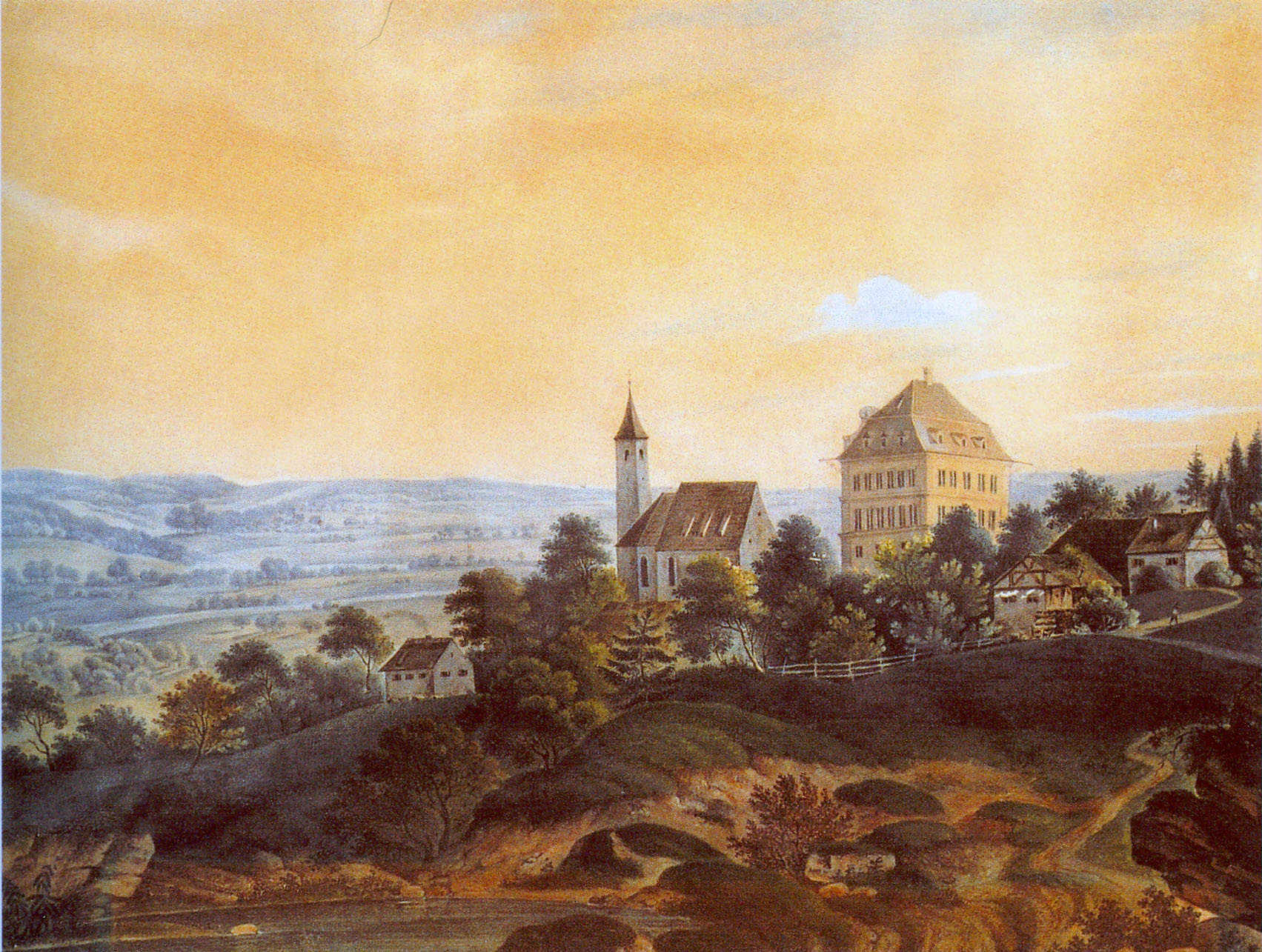
Offingen around 1840 with church and castle

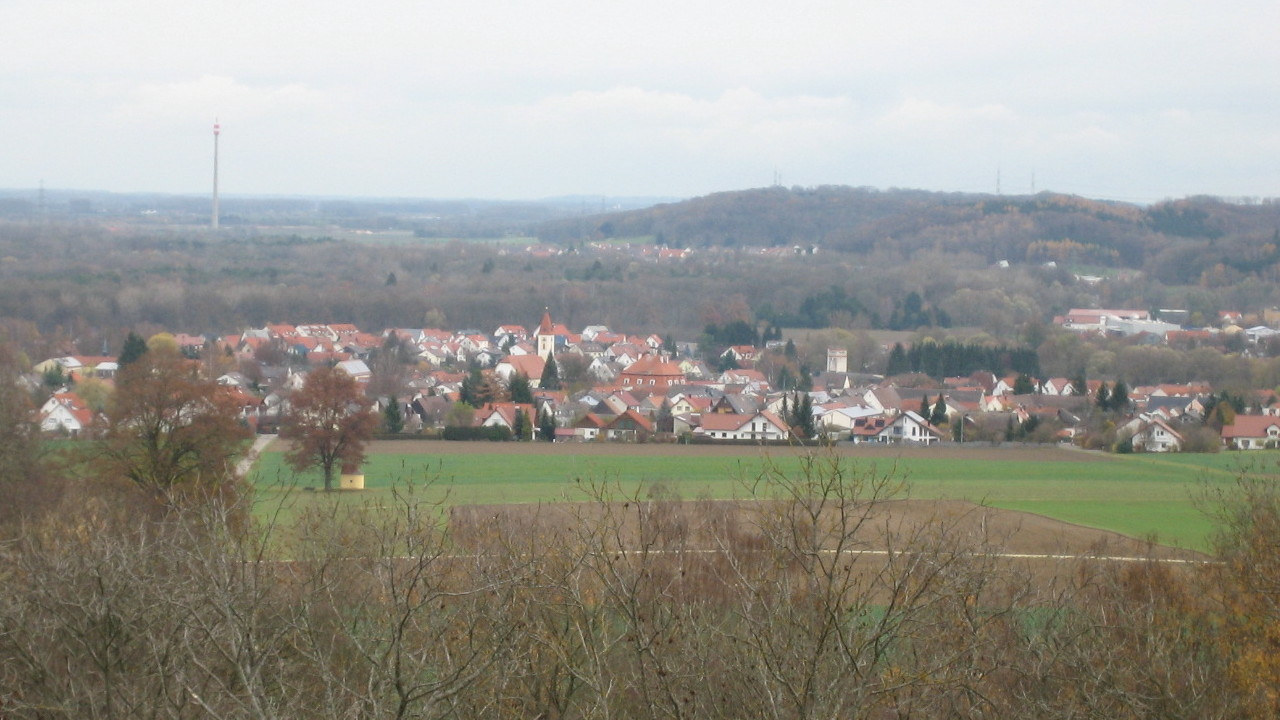
View on Offingen

No major incidents occurred in Offingen during the German Peasants' War of 1525. Rather, the Offingen peasants seemed to have held back, since in March 1525, the Leipheimer Haufen moved to Offingen in order to force Offingen peasants into its alliance. After the defeat of the peasant uprising only two Offingen ringleaders were punished; the village got off lightly with a fine. From the Thirty Years' War from 1618 to 1648 little is known about Offingen. A tax register from 1627 still mentions numerous wealthy people in the town. Until 1680 any records about the general development of the village are missing.

From 1696 to 1700, a new castle was built in Landstrost by the barons of Freyberg. Around 1748 a castle (today's parsonage) was also built in Offingen.

Around 1800, Offingen had the status of an Obervogtamt. Since 1806, the place belongs to Bavaria. The trigger was the Rheinbundakte, an alliance of southern German states with France's Emperor Napoléon Bonaparte. This agreement determined, among other things, that the noble principalities as well as the knightly possessions, which up to then had been directly linked to the empire, were subordinated to the respective sovereign (mediatisation).

The castle in Offingen was inhabited by the barons of Freyberg until 1858 and then sold for lack of further use. After the farmer Johann Haupeltshofer became the new lord of the castle in 1862, the community and the church foundation acquired the property in 1878 and used it as a school and parsonage. The castle in Landstrost was severely damaged in 1871 by several landslides and finally demolished in 1872.

After the Second World War, the community took in about 1,000 expellees. In neighbouring Schnuttenbach, today a district of Offingen, around 75 Hungarian-Germans and around 250 displaced persons from the Sudetenland were accommodated in a barracks camp.

=== Incorporations ===
The municipality of Schnuttenbach was incorporated into Offingen on 1 May 1978. At the same time, the newly founded administrative community of the towns of Offingen, Gundremmingen and Rettenbach began its work, which is based in the new Offingen town hall.

=== District Schnuttenbach ===
The village was first mentioned in a document in 1298. Its special jewel is the chapel of Saint Ursula. It is decorated with frescoes from the 12th century. The attached Church of St. Ursula has artistically remarkable stained glass windows by Munich professor Josef Oberberger.

Schnuttenbach was the site of a labour camp during the National Socialist era. The documentary film Verborgen in Schnuttenbach by Thomas Gerhard Majewski is dedicated to this camp.

== Politics ==
Mayor Thomas Wörz (SPD) has been in office since the 2008 local elections. He was re-elected in March 2014 with 57.3% of the votes.

The Market Community Council has 16 members. Since the local elections in 2014, they have distributed their seats on the following lists:

- CSU: 5 seats
- SPD: 5 seats
- Free voters Offingen: 4 seats
- Free voters association Schnuttenbach: 1 seat
- Young citizens: 1 seat

There are faction communities between the CSU and the Free Voters' Association Schnuttenbach as well as the Free Voters Offingen and the Young Citizens.

== Education ==
- Kindergarten St. Georg Offingen (1 crèche group, 4 kindergarten groups)
- Kinderhaus St. Ursula Schnuttenbach (1 crèche group, 2 kindergarten groups)
- Primary school Offingen
- Secondary school Offingen
- Branch Office Adult Education Centre Günzburg

== Sights and Sights ==
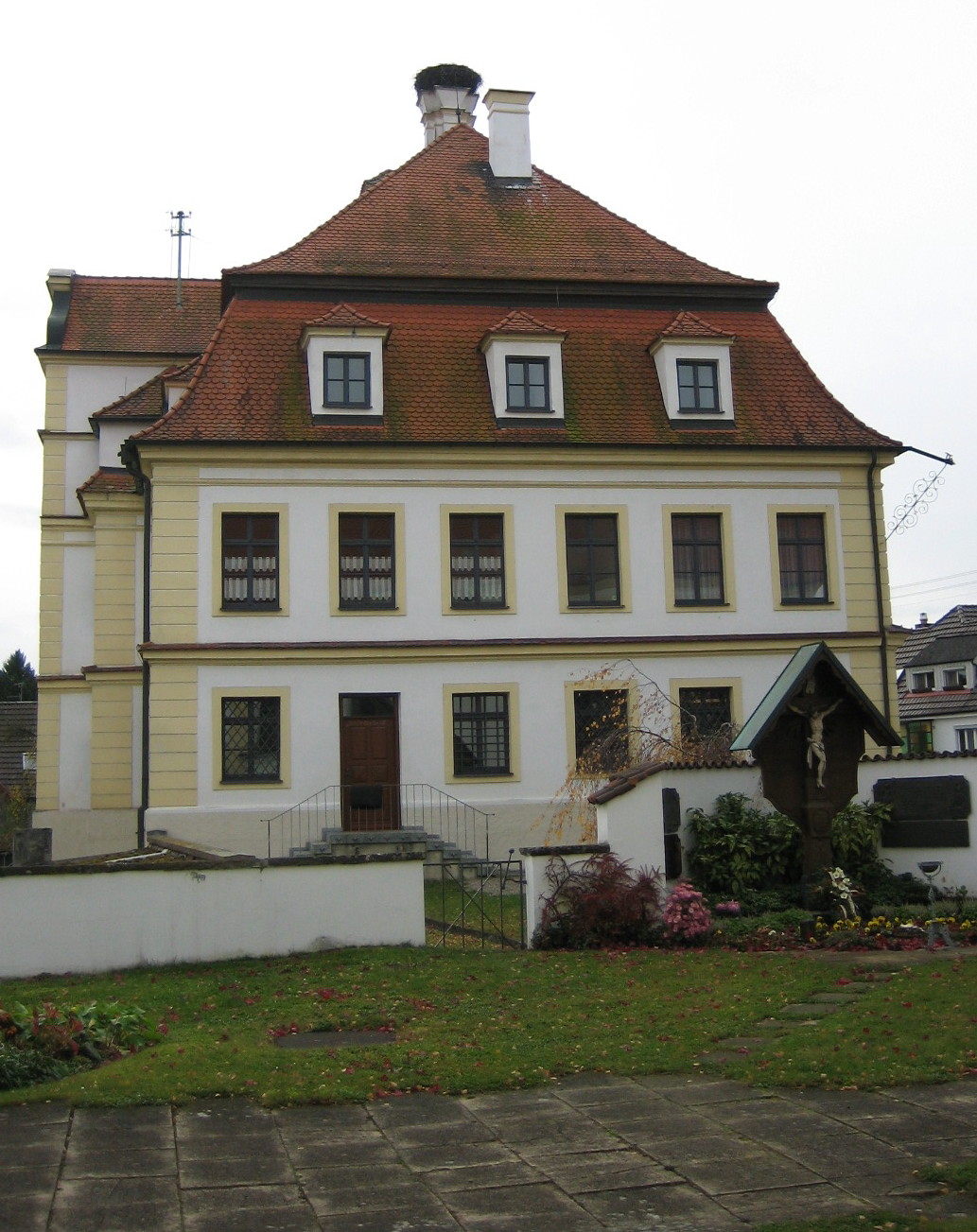
Parsonage (former castle)

- The Castle in Offingen was built around 1748 as the manor house of the barons of Freyberg. The building originally housed the Patrimonial Court. After the mediatization of the principalities and the abolition of feudal jurisdiction in 1848, the building changed hands several times before it became the property of the parish and the church foundation in 1879 and served as a school and parsonage. The stork's nest on the building now known as the Parsonage is inhabited by storks, which have been hibernating in the nest for several years.
- The Catholic Parish church of Saint George was built between 1615 and 1618 by Hans Christoph von Schellenberg and his wife Dorothea on the site of an older predecessor building on the basis of a foundation. The coat of arms of the founder is preserved in the choir vault. The pulpit in the style of the late Renaissance probably still comes from the original equipment of the church. The main altar in the choir dates from the rococo period, the side altars were put together in their present form during a renovation in 1958.
- The Leonhard Chapel was built in 1747 at the instigation of the Lords of Freyberg in place of an older chapel dedicated to Leonhard.
- The Krieger Memorial Chapel was built in 1954 according to plans by Eduard Haertinger.
- The Protestant Church of Reconciliation was built in 1965. A Protestant congregation in Offingen did not form until industrialisation in the second half of the 19th century and only reached a significant size after the arrival of Protestant expellees after the Second World War.
- At Landstrost there is the Barbara Chapel, at the Chapel Trail to Landstrost there is also a Trinity Chapel from the 18th century.
- Since May 2006, the 25-metre-high observation tower on the edge of the Danube valley slope has offered a panoramic view of the Danube valley and the Swabian Alb. The tower has been closed for safety reasons since 2017. In Aug 2024 the date for reopening is unknown.
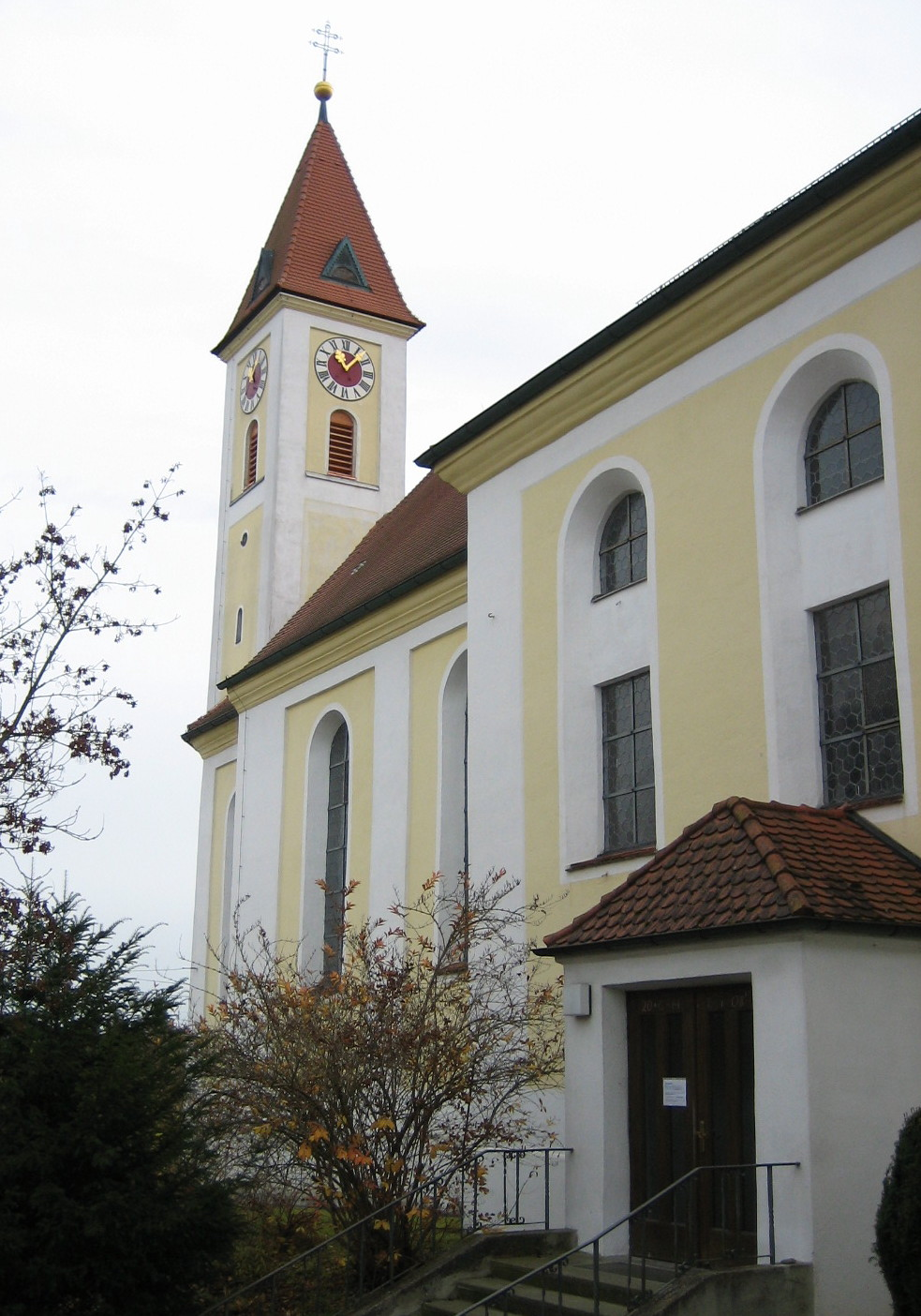
Kirche St. Georg

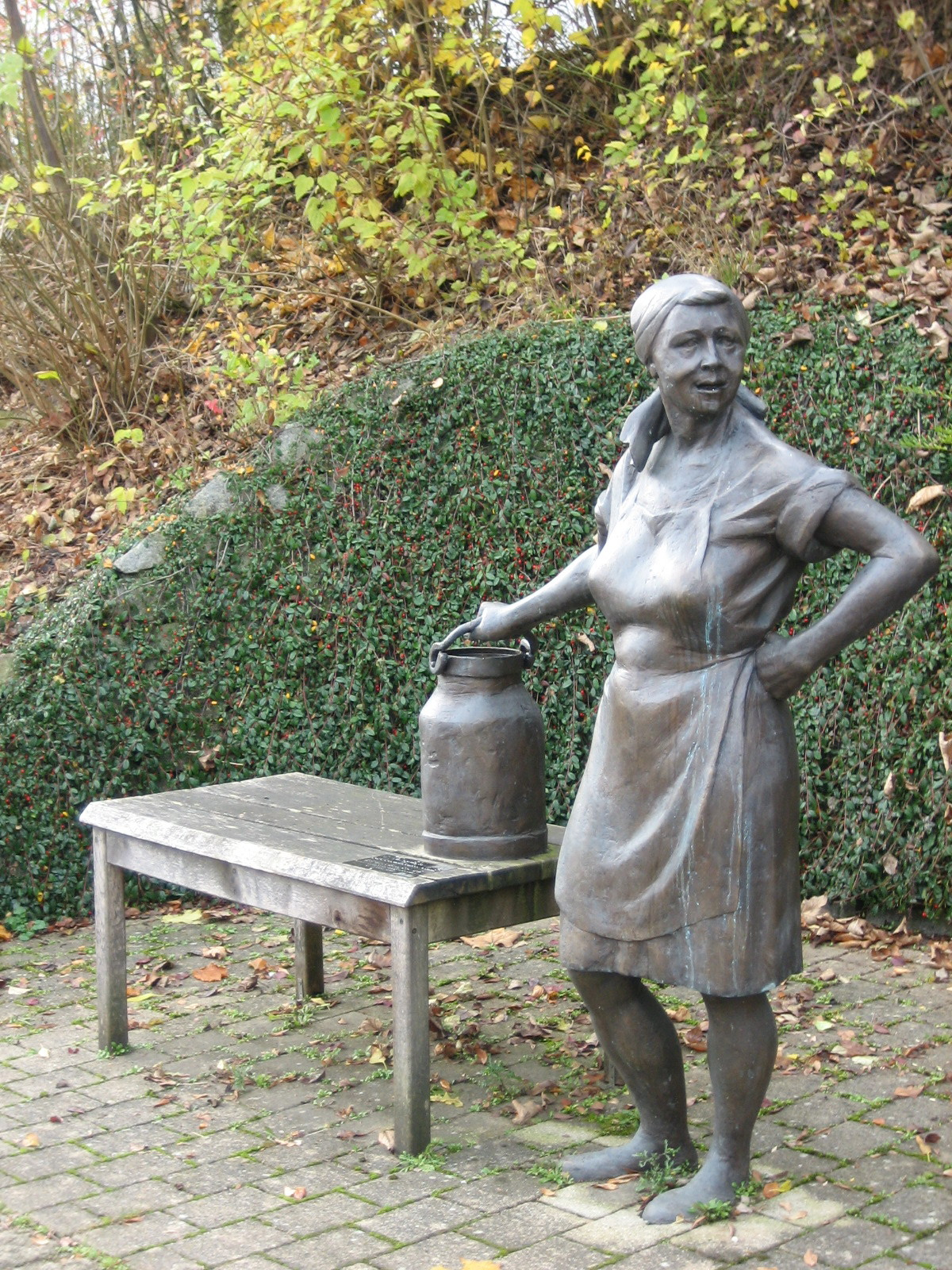
Denkmal für die Milchbäuerin

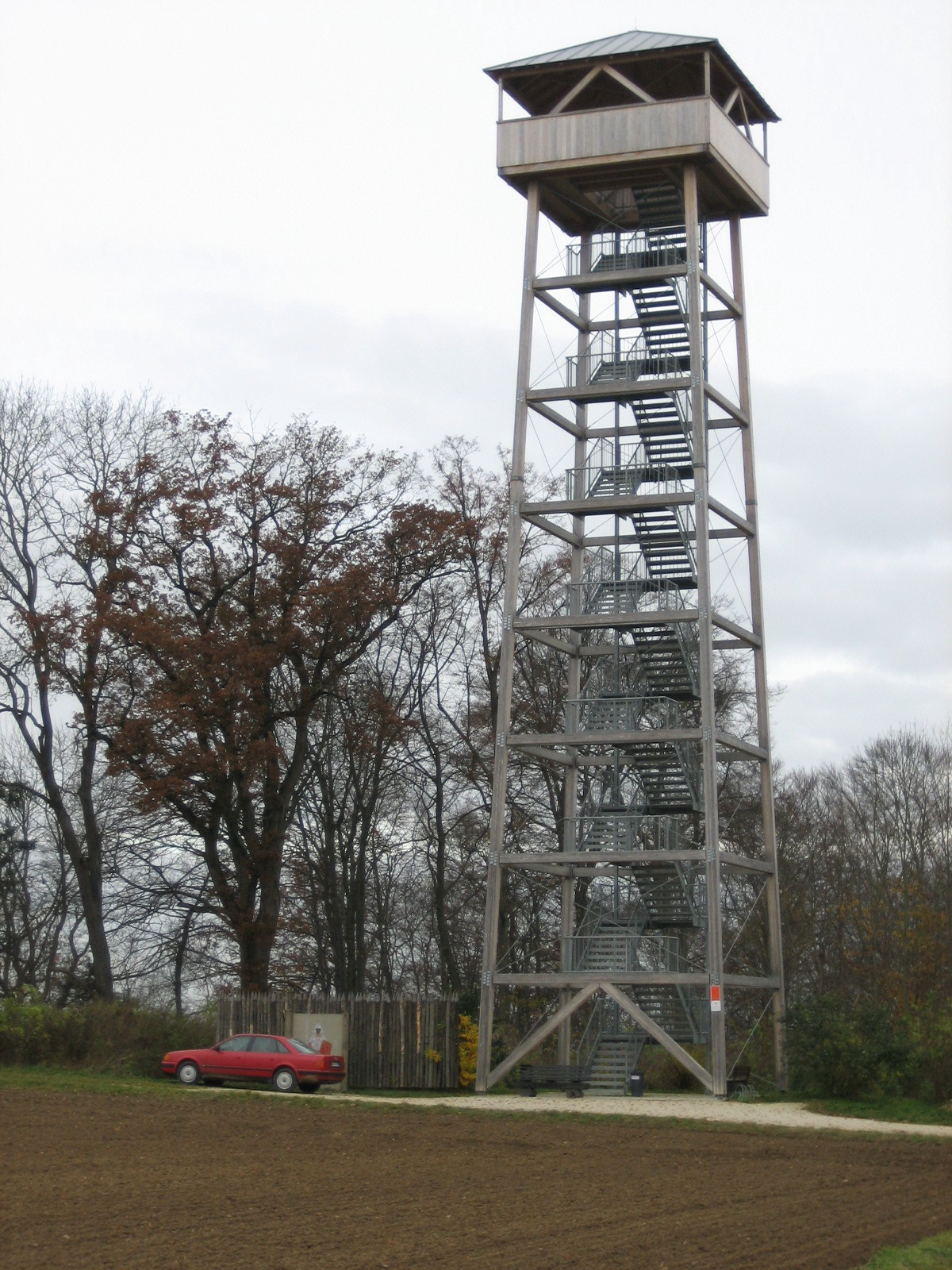
Aussichtsturm Donautal

== Economy ==
Until the middle of the 20th century, Offingen was a strongly rural community. The bronze memorial to the dairy farmer reminds us that the village enabled more than 100 dairy farmers to make a living.

The Augsburg entrepreneurs Johannes and Wilhelm Lembert as well as Franz Baptist Silbermann built the felt factory in 1896. It developed into the economically strongest company in the town. In the 21st century, the BWF Group, which emerged from it, had worldwide business contacts and subsidiaries in several countries. Industrial settlements such as the paper factory, the fertilizer factory or a furniture factory lost importance after a temporary heyday.

Since 1950, two markets have been held annually in Offingen. On July 14, 1971, the Bavarian State Government awarded the town the official designation Markt (market). The market Offingen is not to be confused with Marktoffingen, which lies about 50 km further north.

== Transport ==
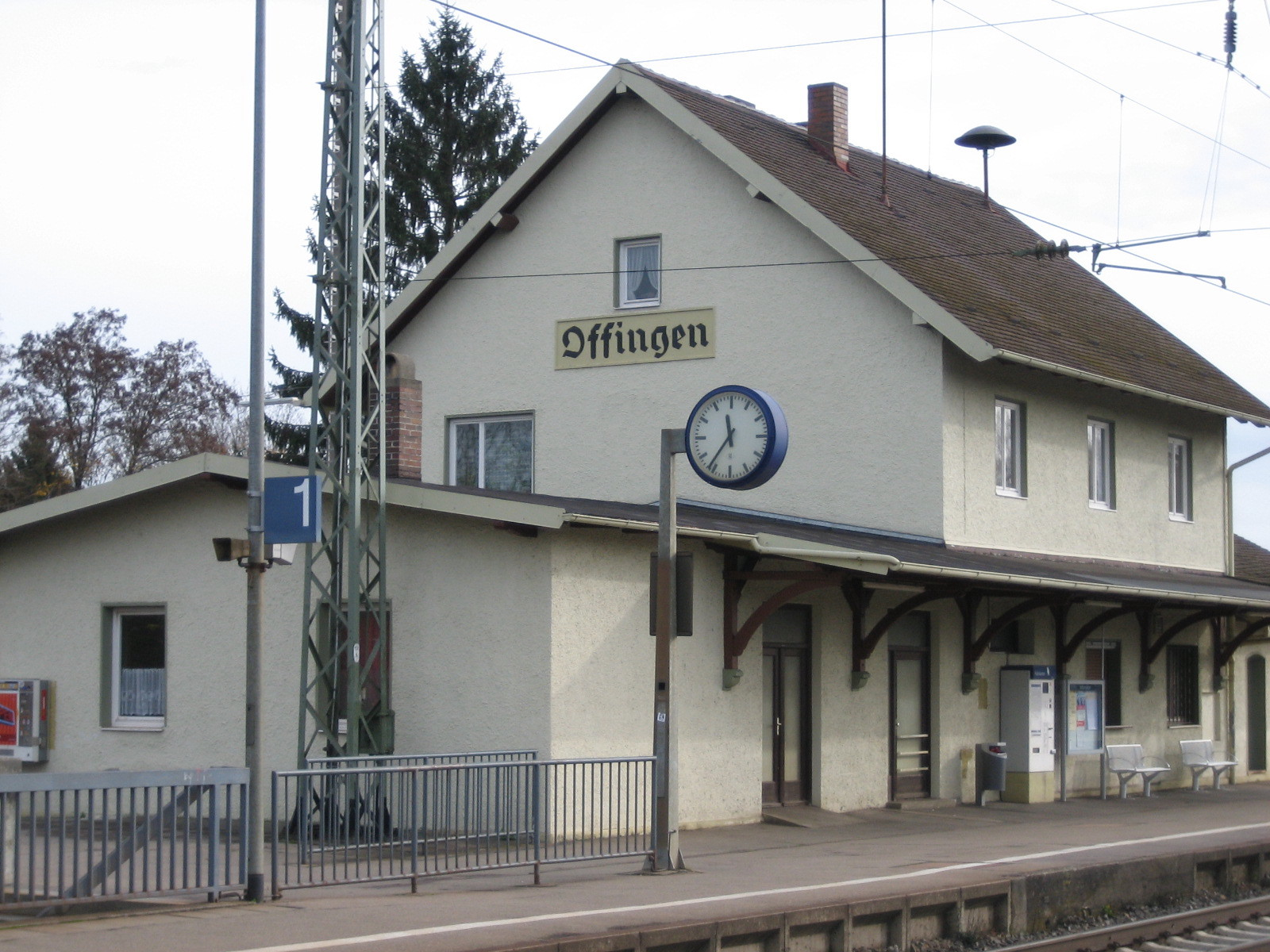
The Offingen station

The Offingen station is on the Ulm–Augsburg line. The official opening of this railway line on 1 May 1854 promoted passenger and freight traffic. The express mail wagon connection from Dillingen an der Donau to Günzburg was shortly thereafter routed via Lauingen and Gundremmingen to Offinger Bahnhof.

A Bavarian law of 29 April 1869 commissioned the construction of a railway link between Günzburg an der Donau and Donauwörth, now part of the Ingolstadt–Neuoffingen railway. The Neuoffingen railway station was built between Günzburg and Offingen. On 15 August 1876, rail traffic was officially launched on the new route. Passenger trains stopped there until 1988. Neuoffingen is one of the last brick stations in Bavaria to be listed.

Offingen is connected to several long-distance cycle routes, including the Danube cycle route (runs from the source to the mouth of the Danube) and, within the European EuroVelo network, the EV 6 long-distance cycle route (runs from the Atlantic to the Black Sea over more than 6000 km along six European rivers).

== Persönlichkeiten ==
- Hans Müller-Schnuttenbach (* 1889 in München; † 1973 in Rosenheim), Painter and draughtsman of Upper Bavarian landscapes
- Ferdinand Rohrhirsch (* 1957 in Offingen; † 2018 in Esslingen am Neckar), Philosopher, theologian and executive coach
