= Haselbach (Kammel) =

River in Bavaria, Germany

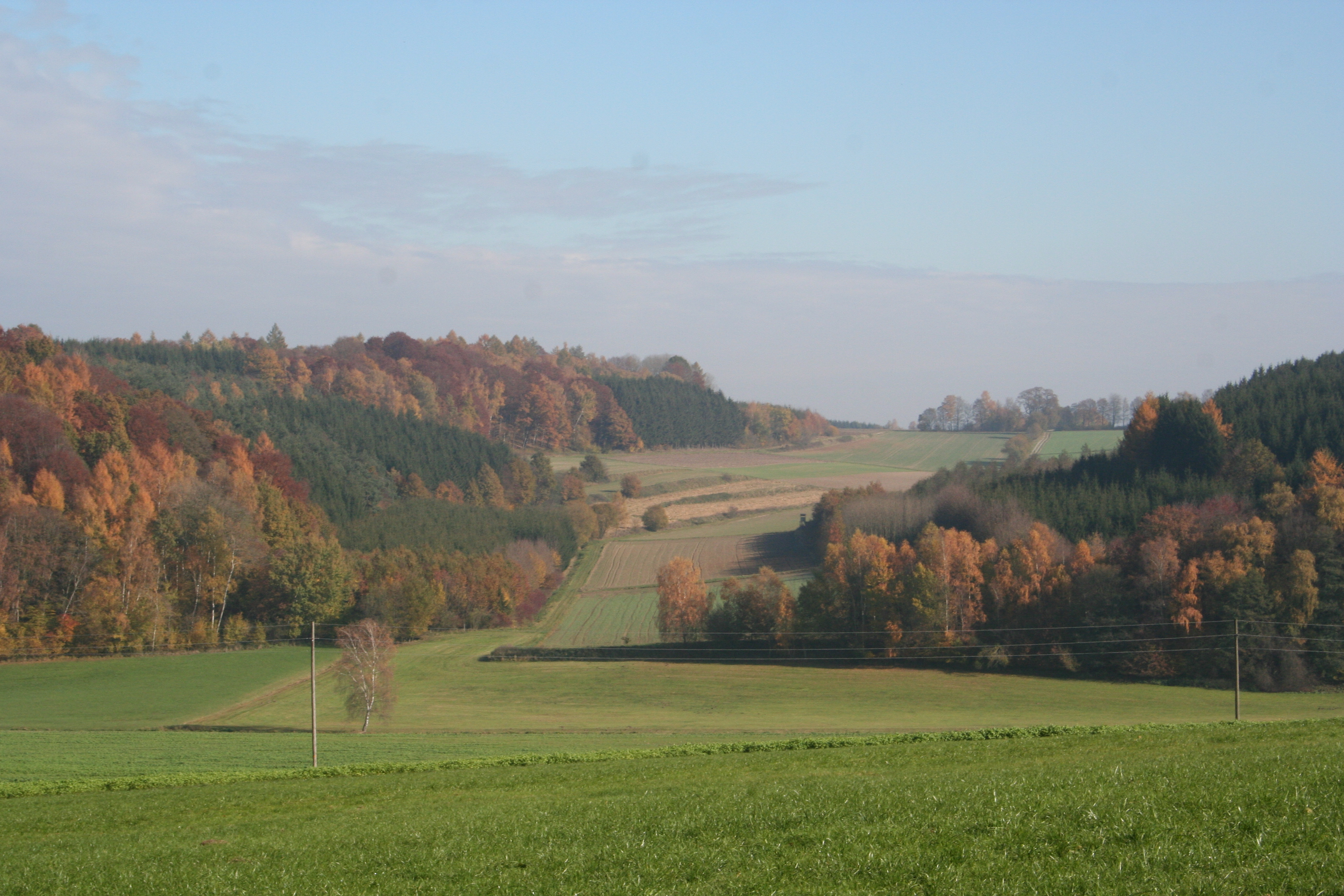
- The valley of the Haselbach

Location
- Country: Germany
- State: Bavaria

Physical characteristics
- Mouth
  - location: Kammel
  - coordinates: 48.3275°N 10.3700°E
- Length: 19.0 km (11.8 mi)

Basin features
- Progression: Kammel→ Mindel→ Danube→ Black Sea

Haselbach (German pronunciation: [ˈhaːzl̩bax]) is a river of Bavaria, Germany. It is a right tributary of the Kammel near Neuburg an der Kammel.

== See also ==
- List of rivers of Bavaria
