= Edelstetten Abbey =

Former convent in the Roman Catholic Diocese of Augsburg, Germany

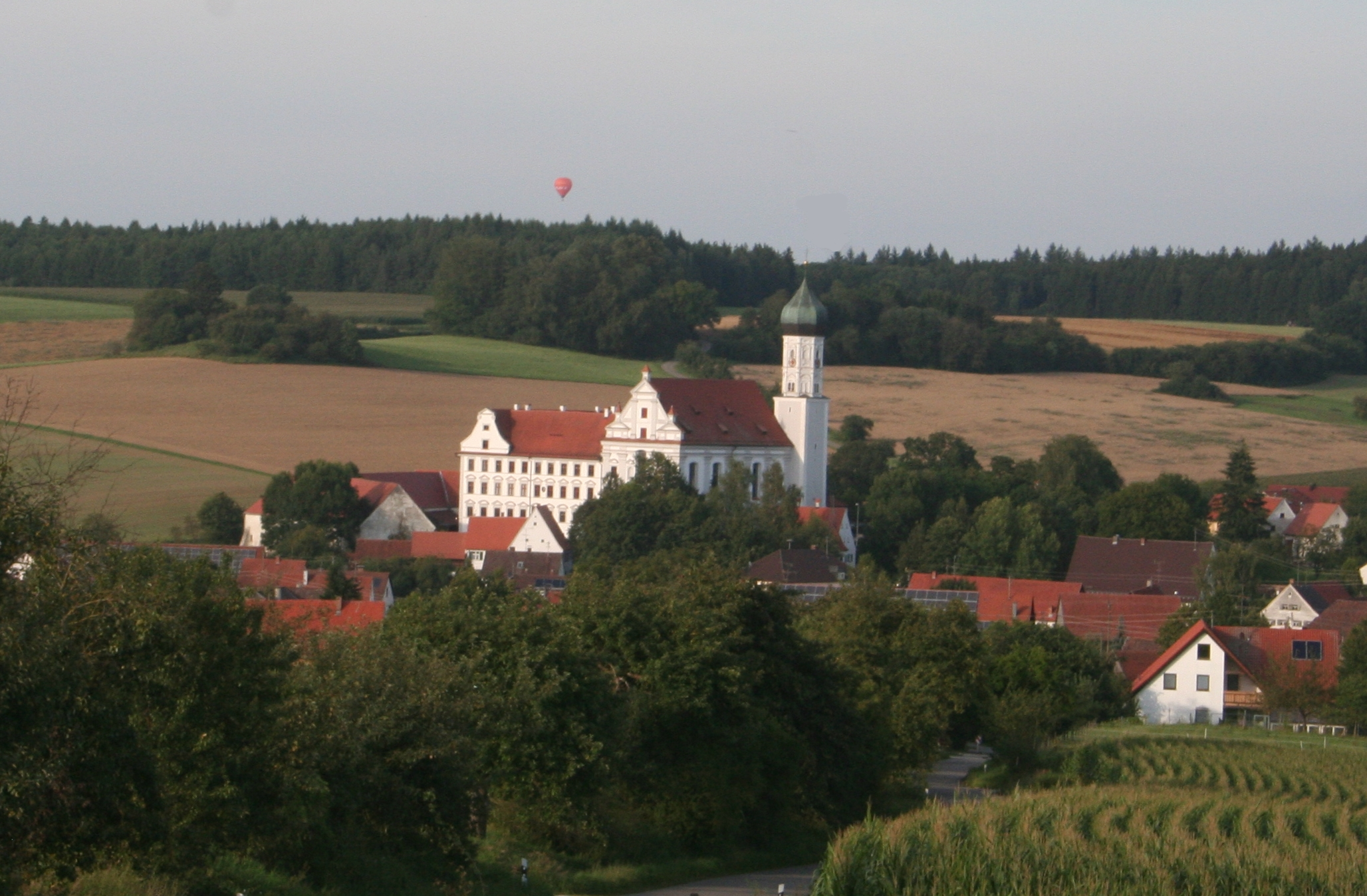
Edelstetten Abbey Complex

The Monastery Edelstetten is a former Kanonissenstift convent located at 48°17′N 10°22′E in the city of Edelstetten, a municipality of Neuburg an der Kammel in Bavaria, Germany. The monastery is in the diocese of Augsburg and in the valley of the Haselbach River.

The former convent is one of the outstanding baroque (Swabian Baroque) style buildings in the district of Günzburg.

== History ==
The monastery, dedicated to Saints John the Baptist and St. Paul was founded in 1126AD. According to the tradition of Gisela Schwabegg-Balzhausen, whose coat of arms, the monastery also took, the founder and first abbess was Mechthild an Augustinian choir woman. Mechthild of Dießen arrived in 1153 and was appointed abbess by the Bishop of Edelstetten to reform the pin. However, after six years, she returned unsuccessful back there. In 1460, the monastery was incorporated into the Margraviate Burgau and by 1500AD the abbey at Edelstetten was recognized as secular Kanonissenstift. The monastery was destroyed three times. The first time in the 14th century, the second time in 1525 during the Peasants War and the third time in the Thirty Years' War, in 1632 by the Swedes.

The present Baroque style building was built in the heyday of the monastery, approximately from 1680 to 1725. The design was by architect Michael Thumb. In the period 1709–1712 the south wing of the monastery, the present church of St. John Baptist and John the Evangelist, was designed by Father Christoph Vogt from the Benedictine monastery of Ottobeuren. Completion of the interior lasted until well into the second half of the 18th century.

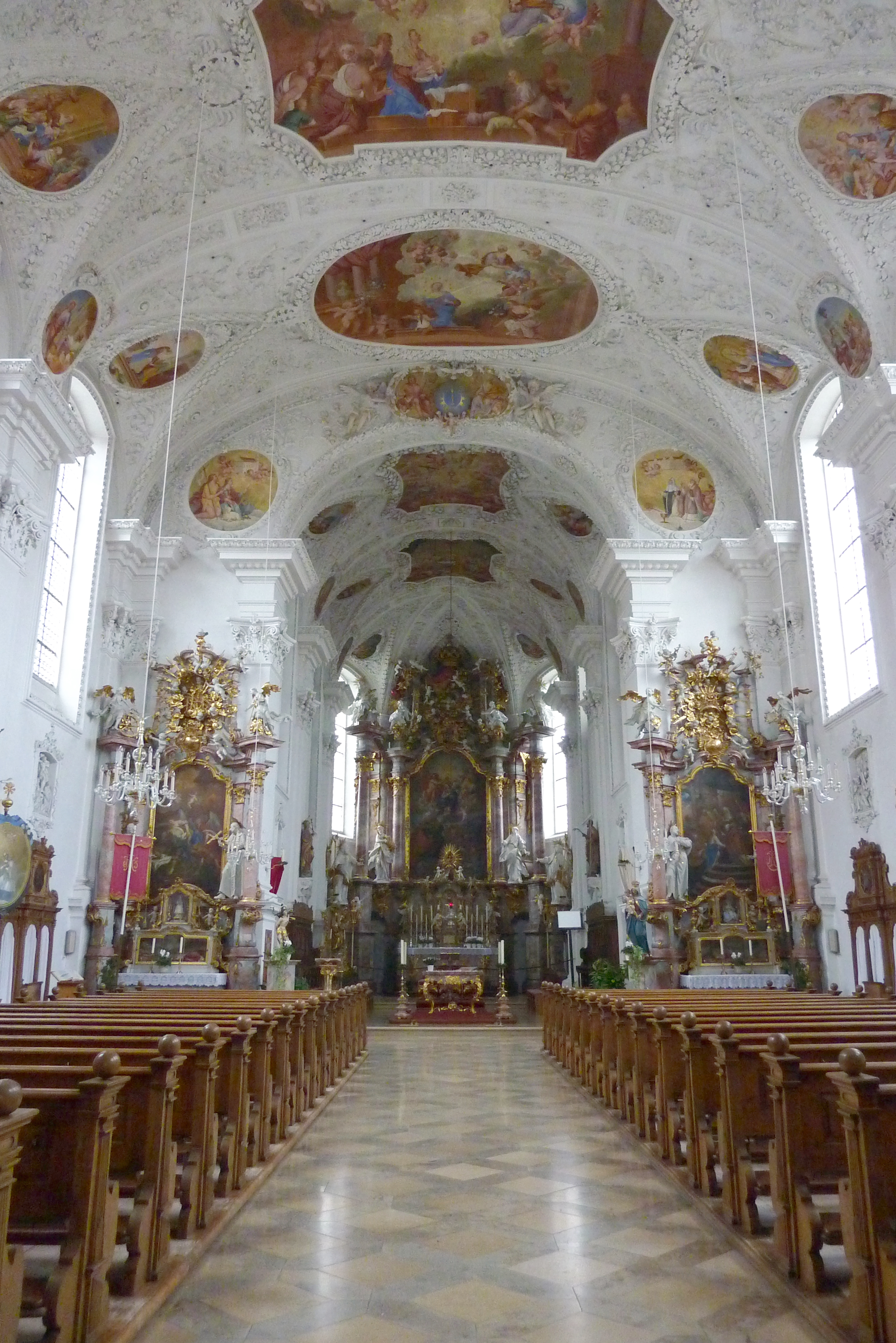
Inside John The Baptist & St Paul Church, Edelstetten.

In 1783, the monastery was raised to the status of imperial abbey, a semi sovereign organ within the Holy Roman Empire answerable only to the Emperor. In 1803, the Abbey of Edelstetten was given to the Prince de Ligne dominion as an immediate principality and as compensation for the loss of the county of Fagnolle in Hainault. Then Charles-Joseph, 7th Prince of Ligne had sold it in 1804 to Prince Nikolaus II Esterházy de Galantha and it remains in Esterházy family until today.

== Architecture ==
The interiors of many rooms from the 18th century are decorated with significant stucco work. An example is the Chinese Hall. The Abbey church is still the parish church of Edelstetten town. while the former chapter house museum. The Abbey crib is decorated with fresco paintings of biblical scenes. The seven scenes are: Adoration of the Shepherds, Adoration of the Magi, Presentation in the Temple, Massacre of the Innocents, house in Nazareth, the twelve year old Jesus in the Temple and Wedding at Cana.

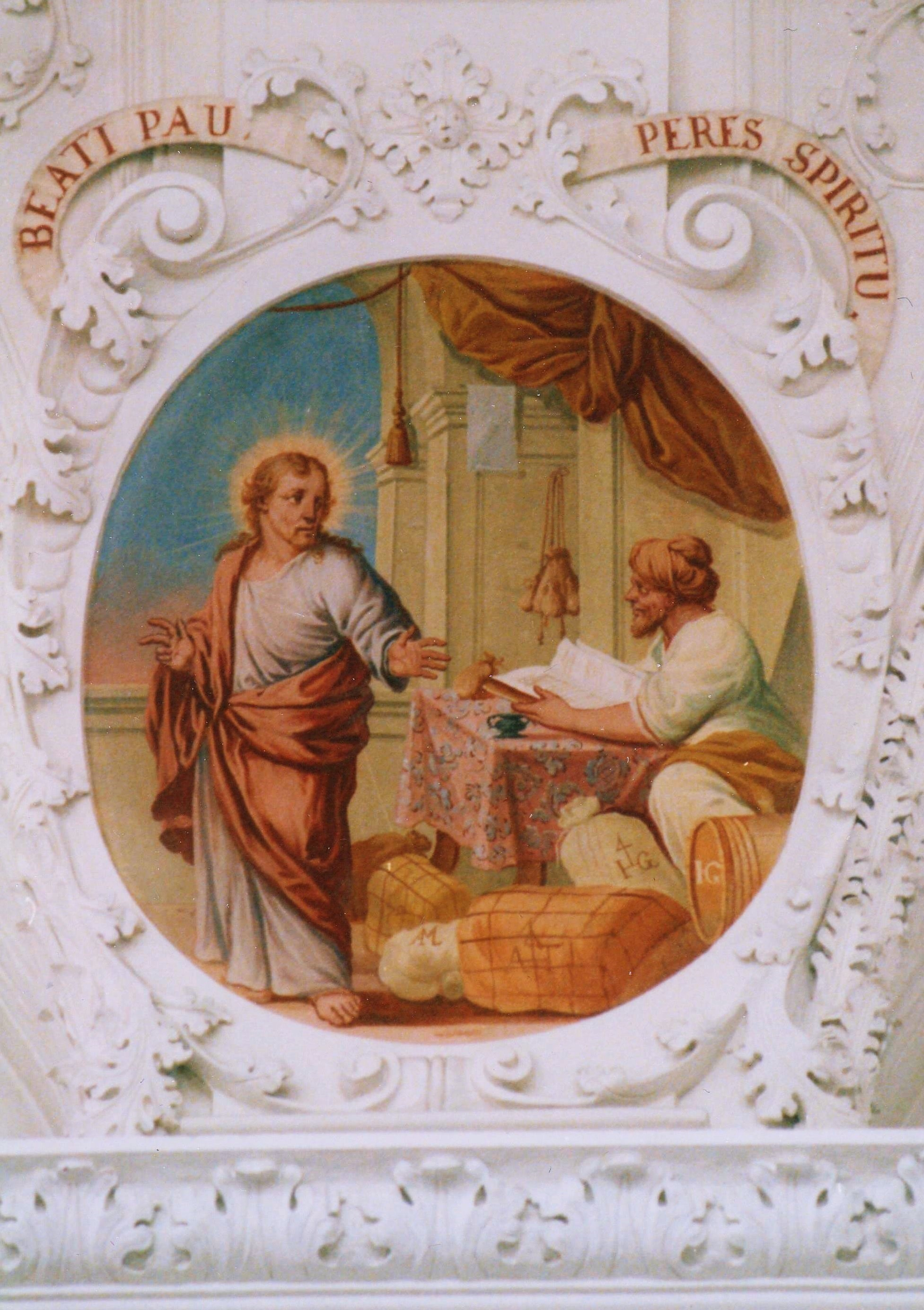

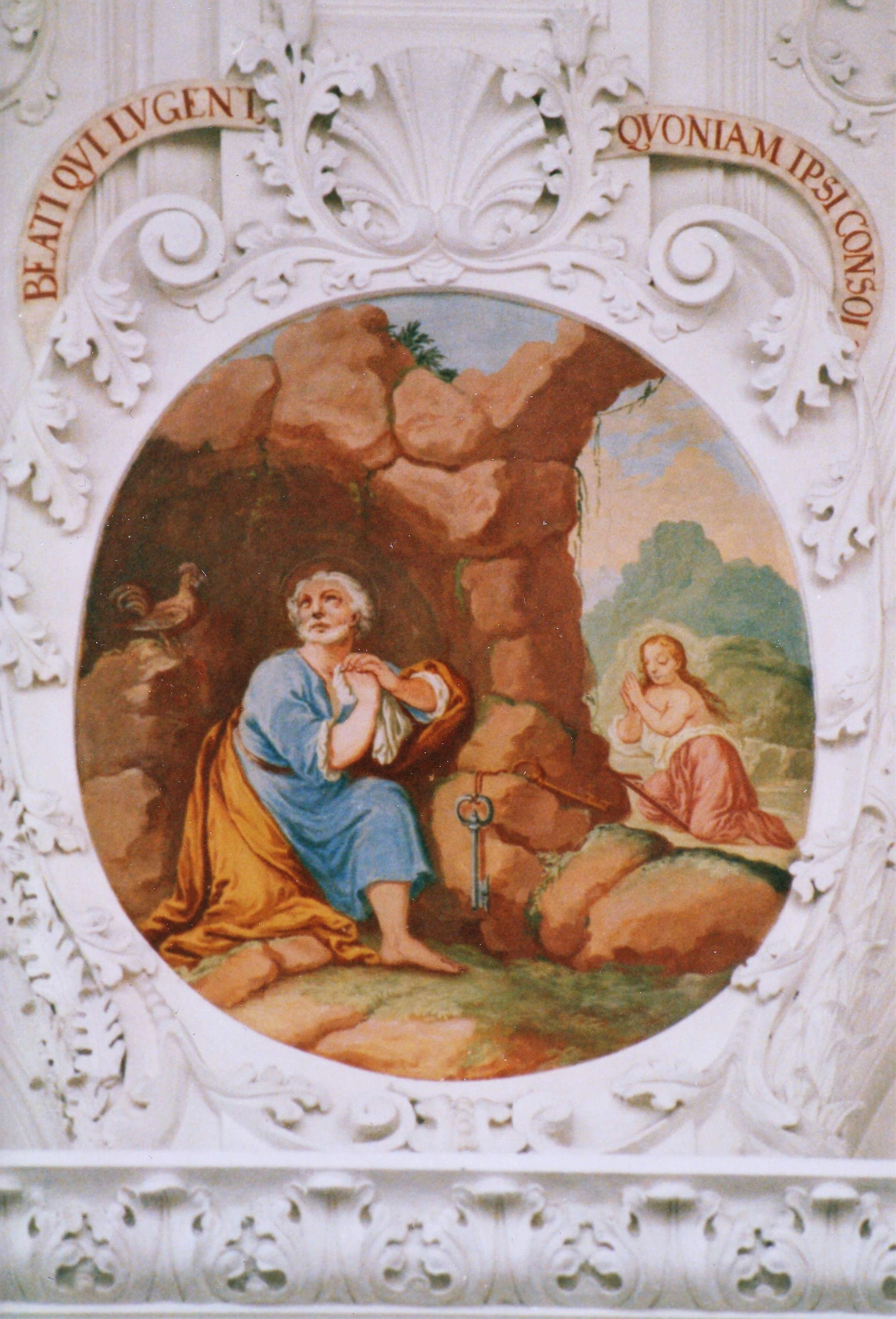

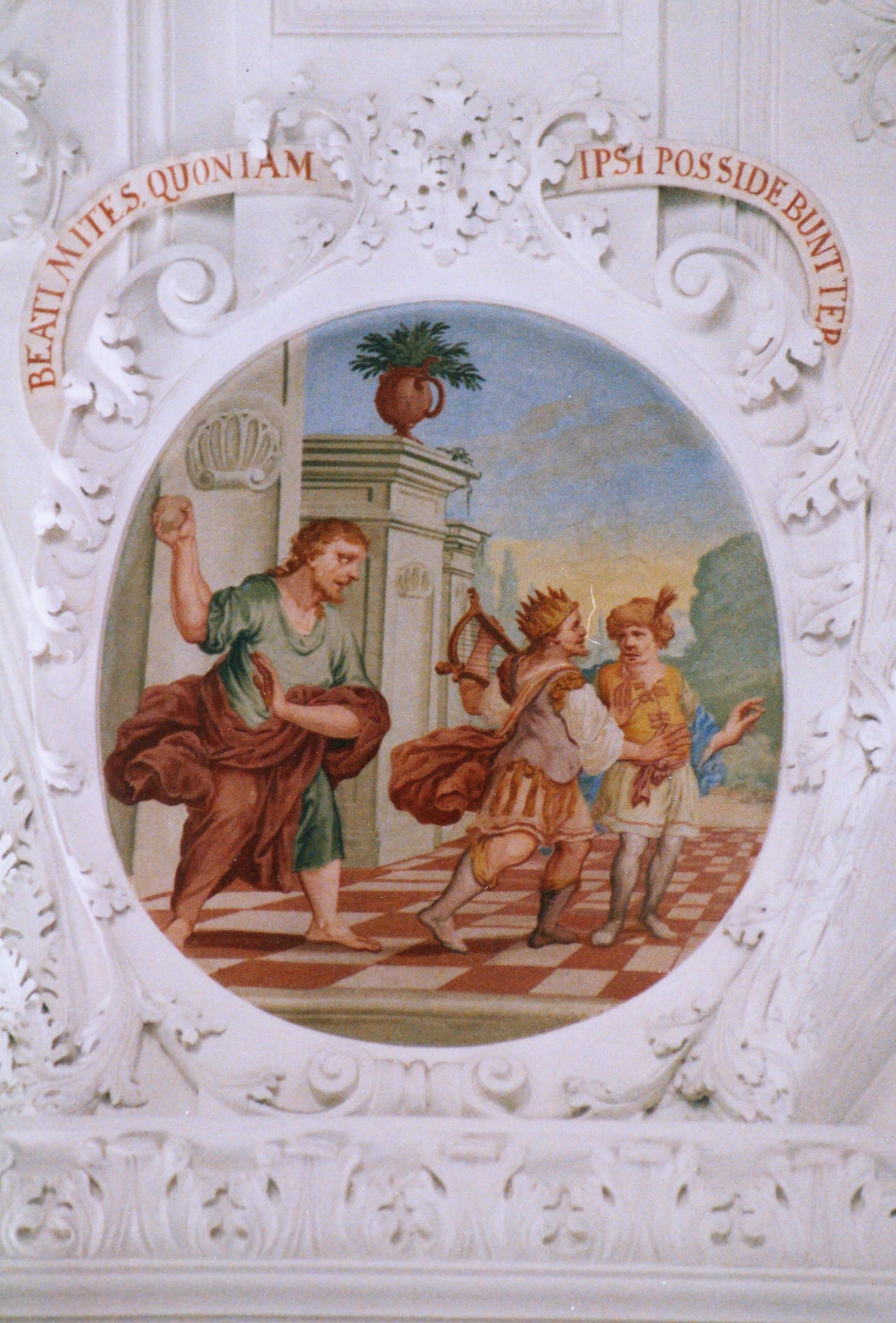

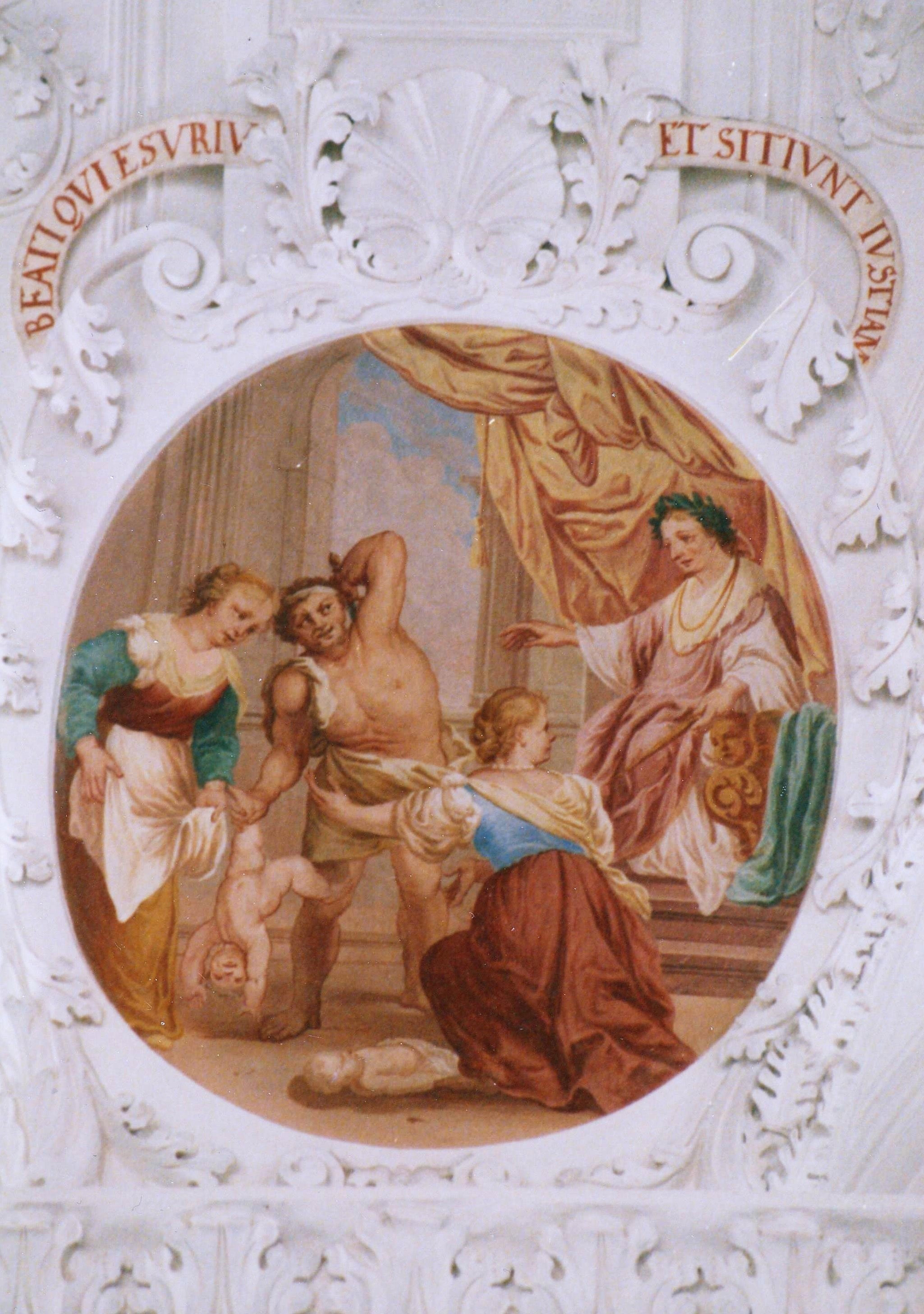

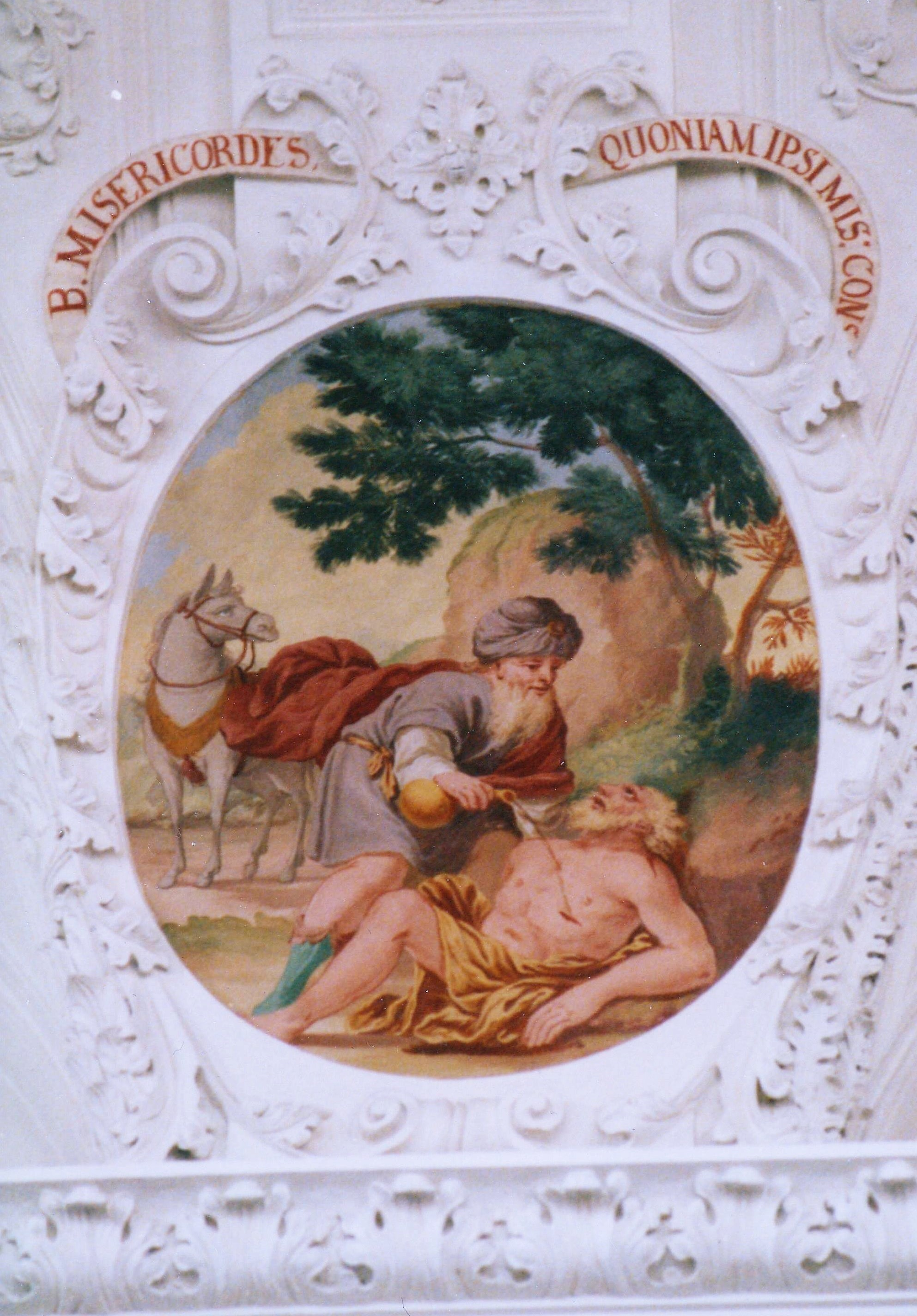

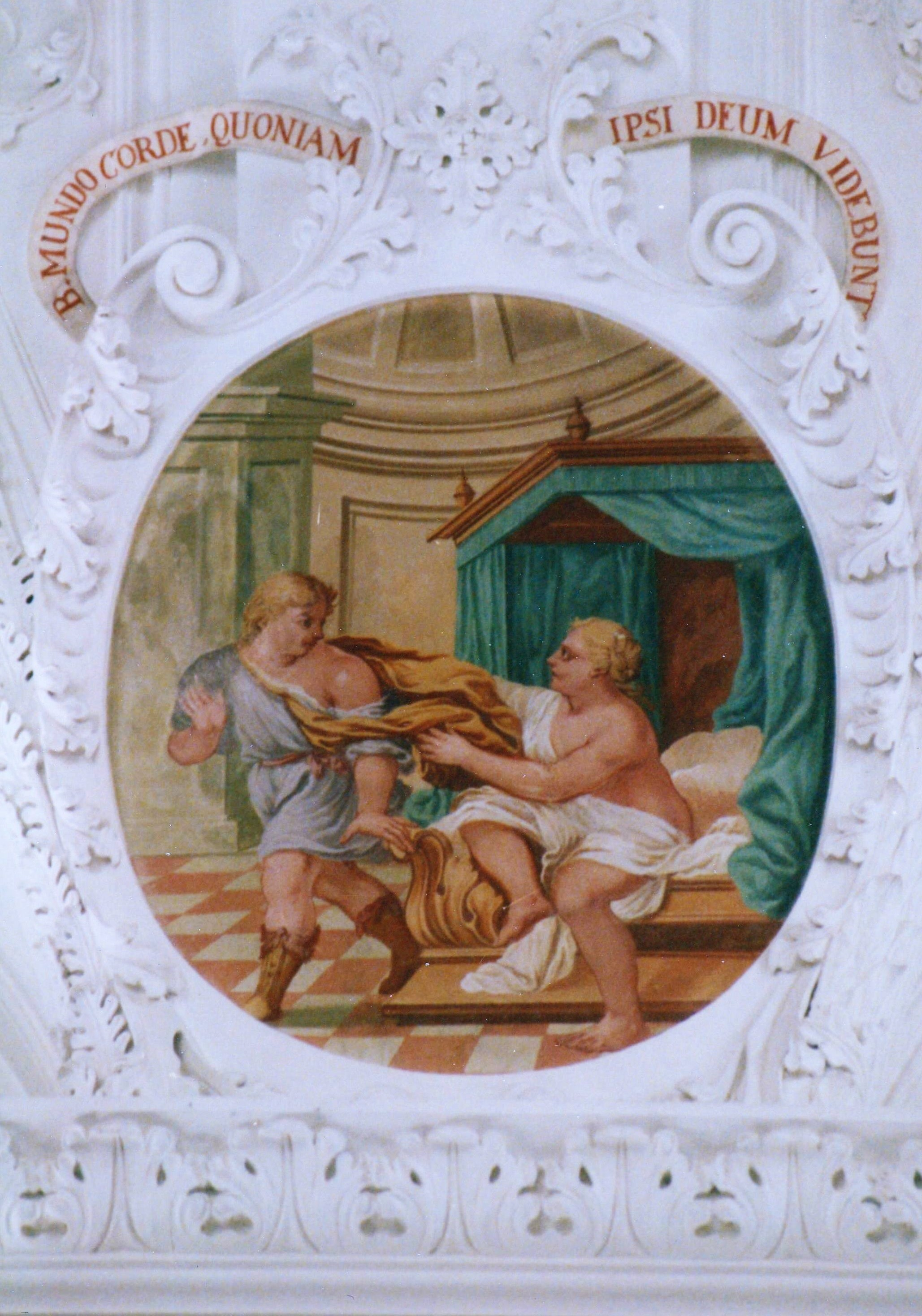

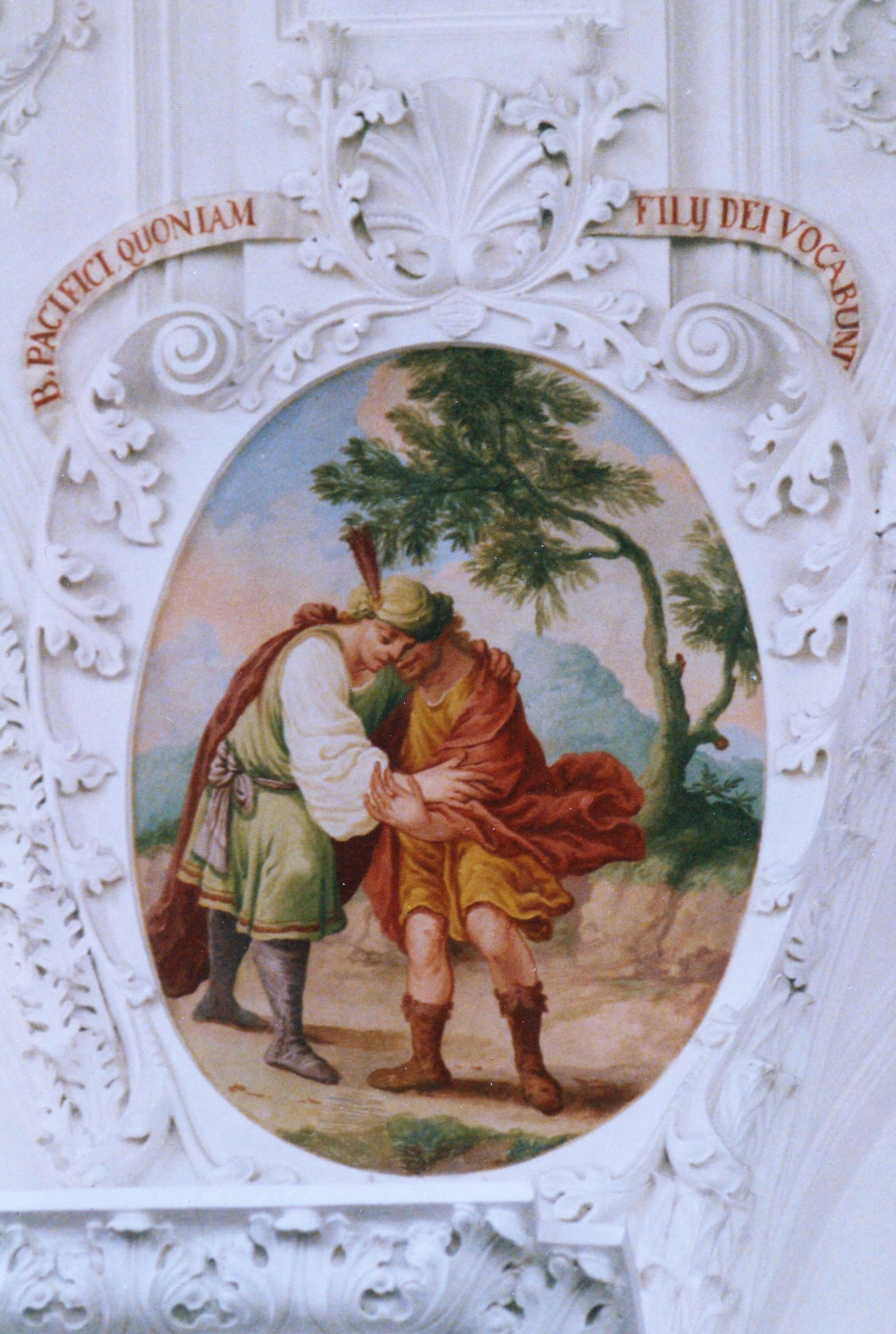

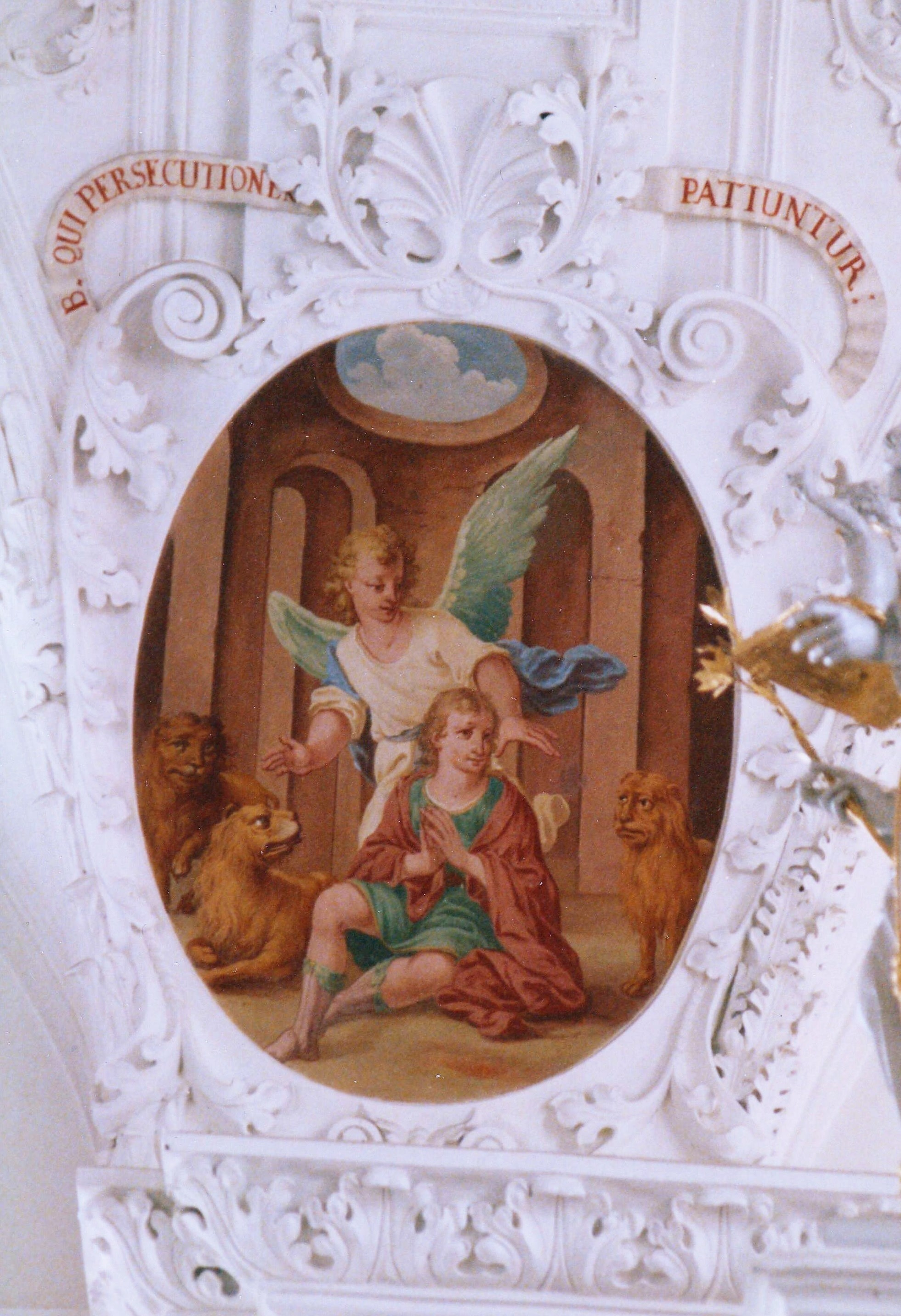

Because of the fresco's, Günzburg County is sometimes called the Swabian nativity paradise.

== Character ==
The rule of the abbey was unusual in that members of its choir could resign and get married. For this reason the Abbey more resembled a sort of charitable institution where the Swabian nobility could educate their daughters. Due to recognition as a secular Kanonissenstift, the Abbey was by the 16th century called Oetlinstetten which evolved to the modern name Edelstetten.
