= Wettenhausen Abbey =

Coordinates: 48°23′47″N 10°21′32″E

Imperial Abbey of Wettenhausen Reichsabtei Wettenhausen
- ? – 1803
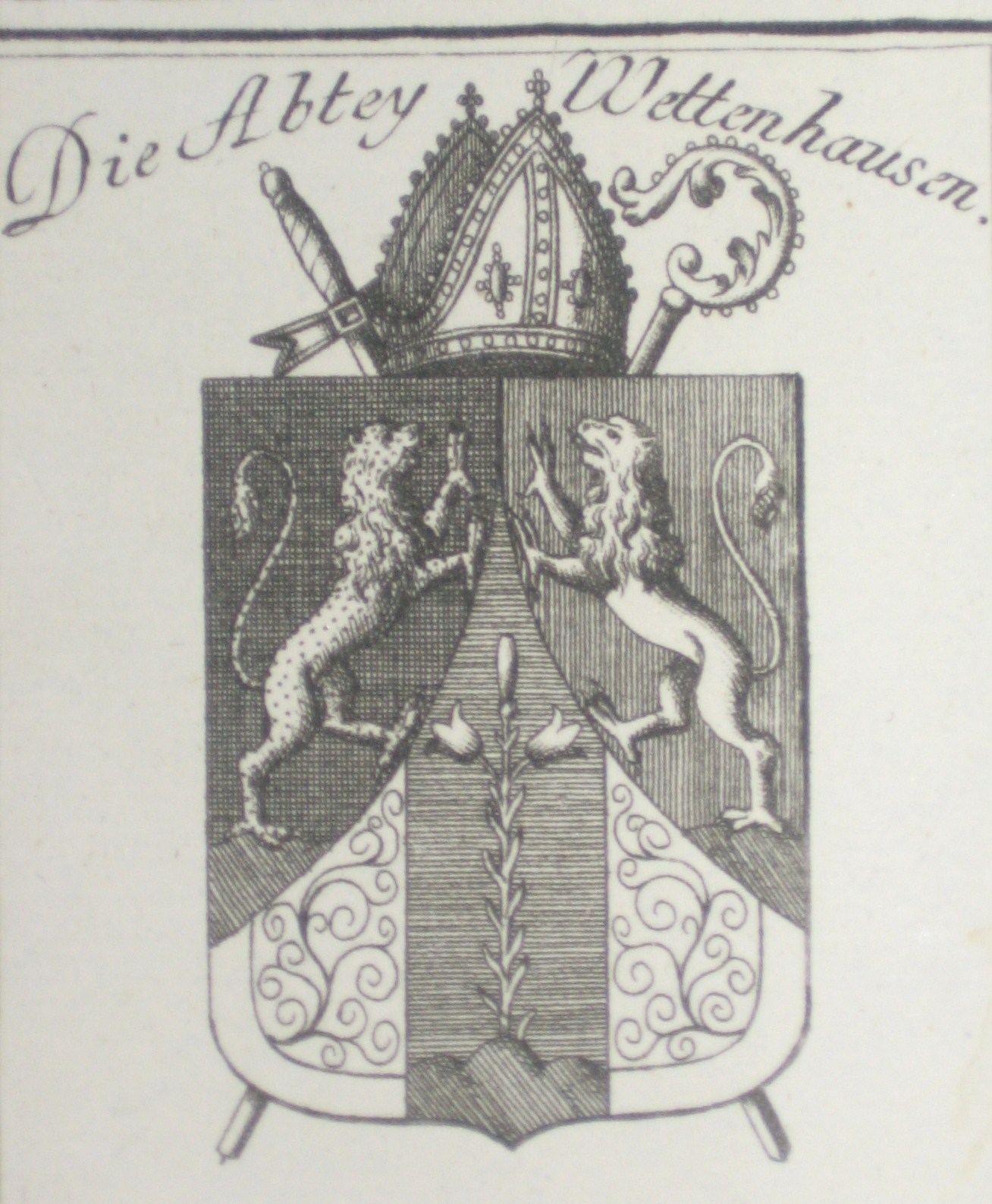
- Coat of arms
- Status: Imperial Abbey
- Capital: Kammeltal
- Common languages: Alemannic German
- Religion: Roman Catholic
- Government: Elective monarchy
- Historical era: Middle Ages
  - Founded: 1130
  - Gained Reichsfreiheit: Uncertain
  - Joined Council of Princes: 1793
  - Secularised to Bavaria: 1803
Preceded by	Succeeded by
Duchy of Swabia	Electorate of Bavaria

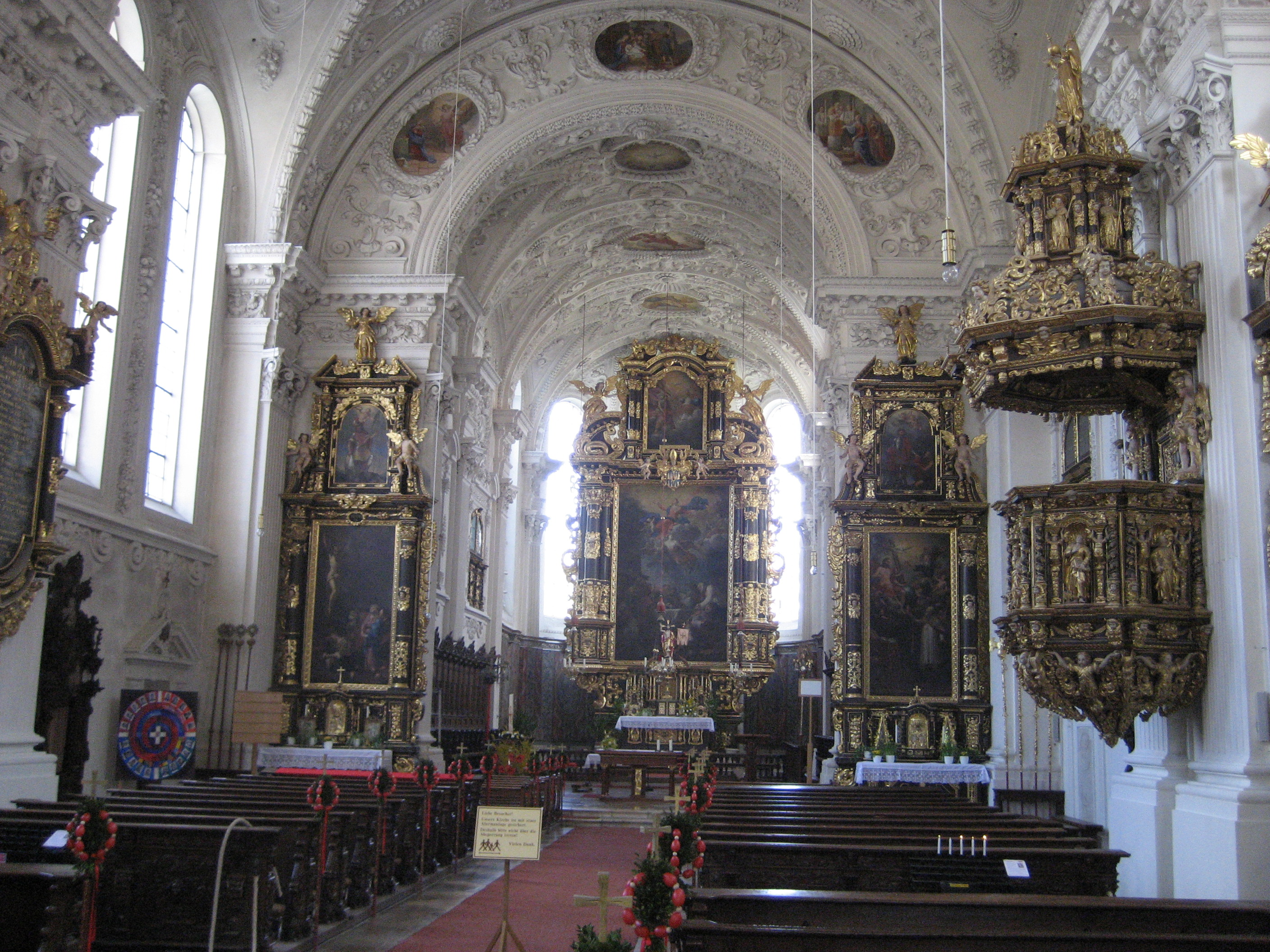
Interior of the former abbey church, looking east

Wettenhausen Abbey (German: Kloster Wettenhausen, Reichsabtei Wettenhausen) was an Imperial Abbey of Augustinian Canons until its secularization in 1802–1803. Being one of the 40-odd self-ruling Imperial Abbeys of the Holy Roman Empire, Wettenhaussen Abbey was a virtually independent state. Its abbot had seat and voice in the Imperial Diet, where he sat on the Bench of the Prelates of Swabia. At the time of secularization, the Abbey's territory covered 56 square kilometers and it had about 5,400 subjects.

It is now a Dominican convent. The abbey is in Wettenhausen in the municipality of Kammeltal in Bavaria.

== History ==
=== Augustinian Canons ===
The abbey, dedicated to Saint Mary the Virgin and Saint George, was founded in 1130 by Countess Gertrud of Roggenstein and her two sons for the salvation of their soul. According to an ancient chronicle, the Countess told her two sons that she would endow the new monastery with as much land as she could plow in a day. She then mounted a horse around whose neck she hung a good luck charm and succeeded in plowing a vast area. The exact date when the Abbey obtained the coveted status of Imperial Abbey is uncertain.

Wettenhaussen Abbey was dissolved in the course of the secularization of 1803 and its territory annexed to Bavaria. The library of 7,000 volumes was transferred to the library at Dillingen. The premises were thereafter used for a rent office.

=== Dominican sisters ===
In 1864 the buildings were acquired by the Dominican Sisters of St Ursula's in Augsburg, who established a school here, which today is a Gymnasium (secondary school) specialising in music and the sciences.

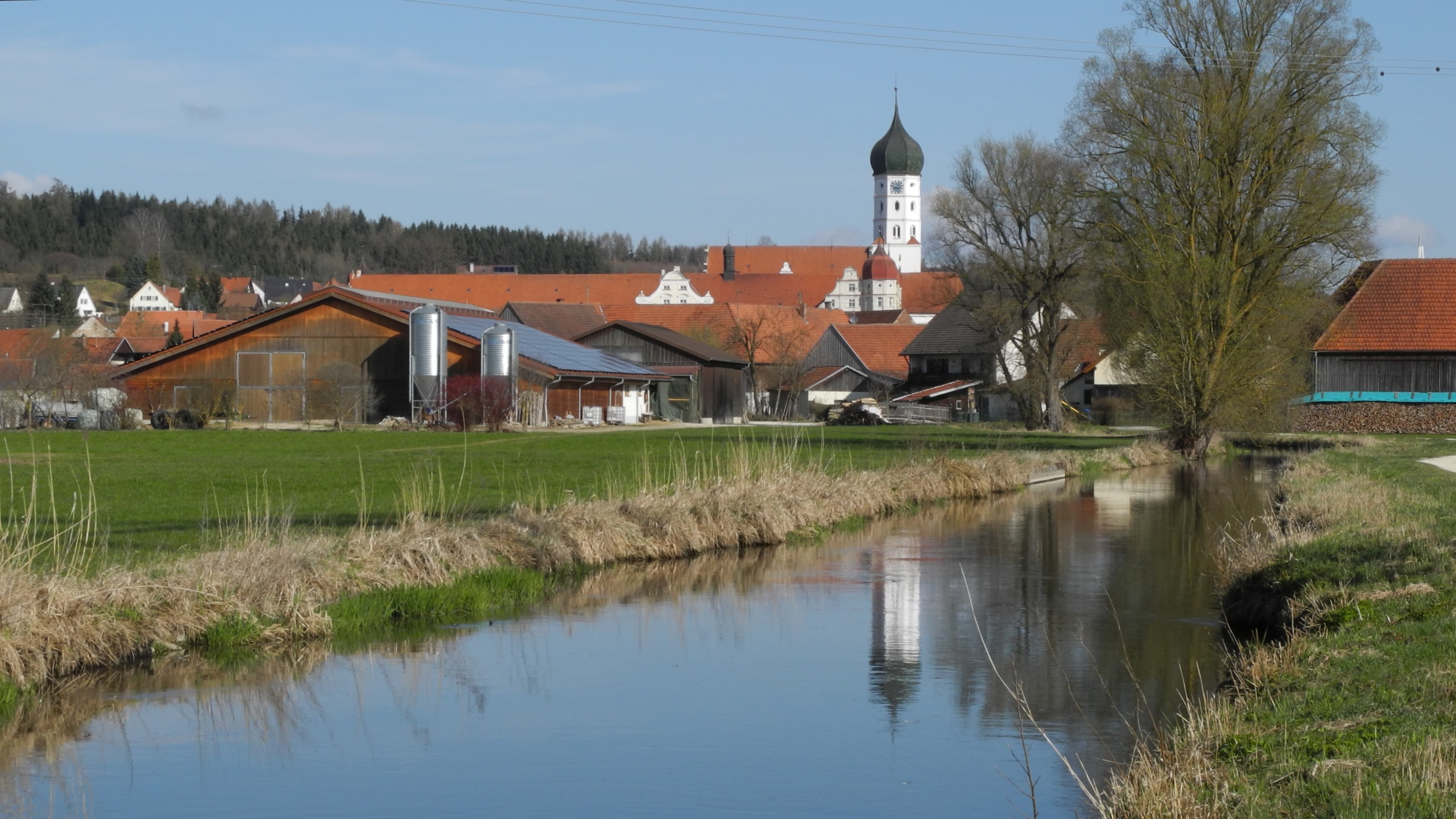
The Kammel with Wettenhausen Abbey in the background

== Abbey church ==
The former abbey church of the Assumption is now a parish church. It was built in the 12th century and altered in the 17th in the Baroque style by Michael Thumb.

== Bibliography ==
- Wüst, Wolfgang, 1983. Das Reichsstift Wettenhausen: Besitz, Herrschaftsorganisation und Landeshoheit, in: Kloster Wettenhausen. Beiträge aus Geschichte und Gegenwart im Rückblick auf sein tausendjähriges Bestehen 982–1982 (Günzburger Hefte 19), pp29–45. Weißenhorn.
- Wüst, Wolfgang, 2001. Die Suche nach dem irdischen Reich in schwäbischen Gotteshäusern. Herrschaftliche Souveränität als Thema der Klosterchronistik. Wettenhausen und Kaisheim im Vergleich, in: Suevia Sacra. Zur Geschichte der ostschwäbischen Reichsstifte im Spätmittelalter und in der Frühen Neuzeit (Augsburger Beiträge zur Landesgeschichte Bayerisch-Schwabens 8 — Festschrift für Pankraz Fried zum 70. Geburtstag) (ed. Wilhelm Liebhart and Ulrich Faust), pp115–132. Sigmaringen.
