= Kammel =

River in Germany

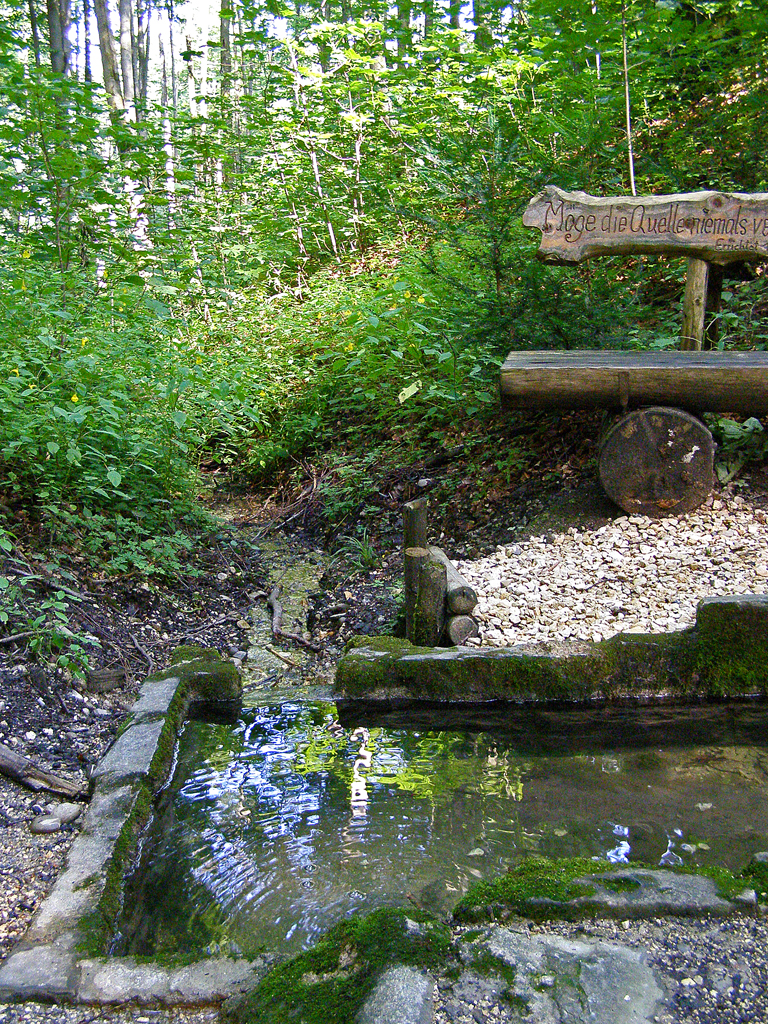
- The source of the Kammel

Location
- Country: Germany

Physical characteristics
- Source
  - location: Unterallgäu west of Mindelheim
  - coordinates: 47°59′48″N 10°24′03″E
  - elevation: 704 m (2,310 ft)
- Mouth
  - location: Mindel near Offingen
  - coordinates: 48°28′14″N 10°22′42″E
  - elevation: 439 m (1,440 ft)
- Length: 74.0 km (46.0 mi)
- Basin size: 260 km^{2} (100 sq mi)

Basin features
- Progression: Mindel→ Danube→ Black Sea

The Kammel (German pronunciation: [ˈkaml̩]) is a river in Bavaria, southern Germany. The Kammel originates west of Mindelheim, in the district Unterallgäu, and flows generally north. It flows into the Mindel (left tributary) south of Offingen at the Danube, east of Günzburg in the district Günzburg. So it is an indirect right tributary of the Danube. The difference in altitude between the origin and the mouth is 265 m.

== Tributaries ==
Tributaries which flow into the Kammel are (from south to north):

- the Krumbach (left tributary); confluence with the Kammel in Krumbach
- the Haselbach (right tributary); confluence with the Kammel in Naichen, municipality: Neuburg an der Kammel
- the Krähenbach (right tributary); confluence with the Kammel in Ettenbeuren, municipality: Kammeltal

== Municipalities the Kammel flows through ==
Municipalities which are passed by the Kammel are (from south to north):
in the district Unterallgäu: Stetten, Kammlach, Oberrieden, Pfaffenhausen and Breitenbrunn;
in the district Günzburg: Aletshausen, the town Krumbach, Neuburg an der Kammel, Kammeltal, the town Burgau and Rettenbach;

== Origin of the name ==
The name of the Kammel derives from the Celtic kamb or camb which means crooked. So the Kammel is the crooked water. Other authors are of the opinion that Kammel means bog. Both origins of the name can be possible because the meanders of the stream Kammel are clearly distinct.

== Attractions in the valleys of the Kammel and its tributaries ==
- Niederraunau: castle and church
- Krumbach
- Billenhausen: Dossenberger Pfarrhof (parsonage)
- Neuburg an der Kammel: castle, church and the pilgrimage church Maria Feldblume between Neuburg and Wattenweiler
- Edelstetten Abbey in Edelstetten in the valley of the Haselbach
- Naichen: hammer mill museum
- Wettenhausen Abbey in Wettenhausen (municipality of Kammeltal)
- Burgau
- the Silbersee near Burgau, a flooded gravel pit and popular greenbelt recreation area with campsite
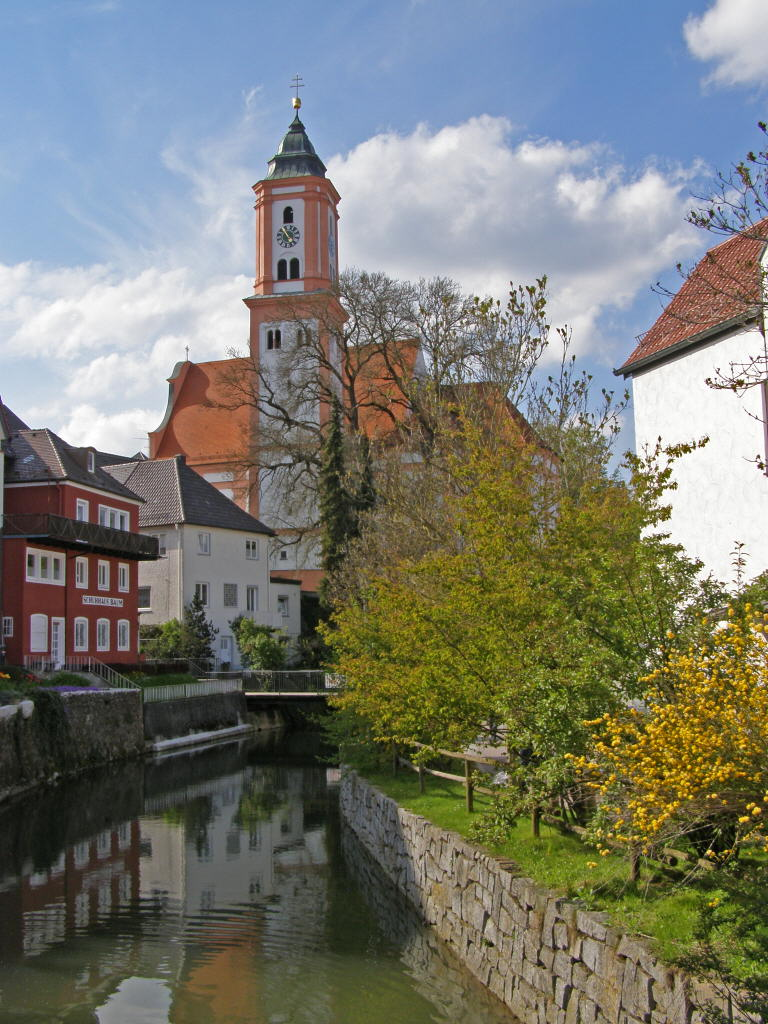
the church St Michael seen from a bridge across the Kammel in Krumbach

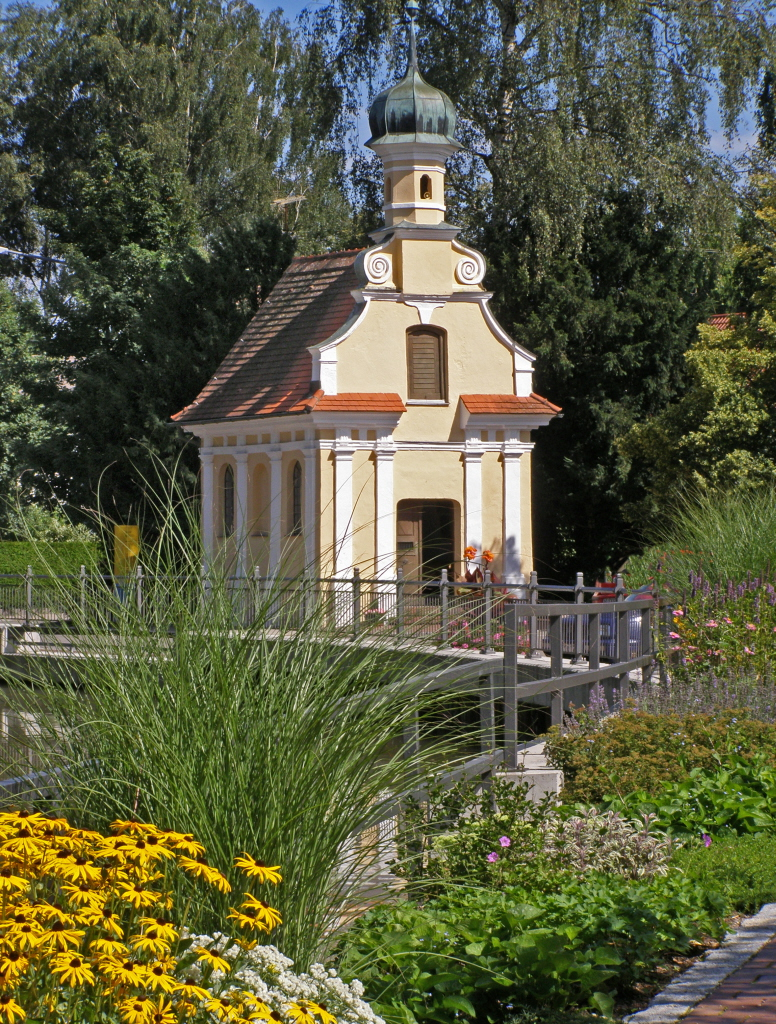
Mühlkapelle / mills-chapel at the bank of the Kammel in Krumbach

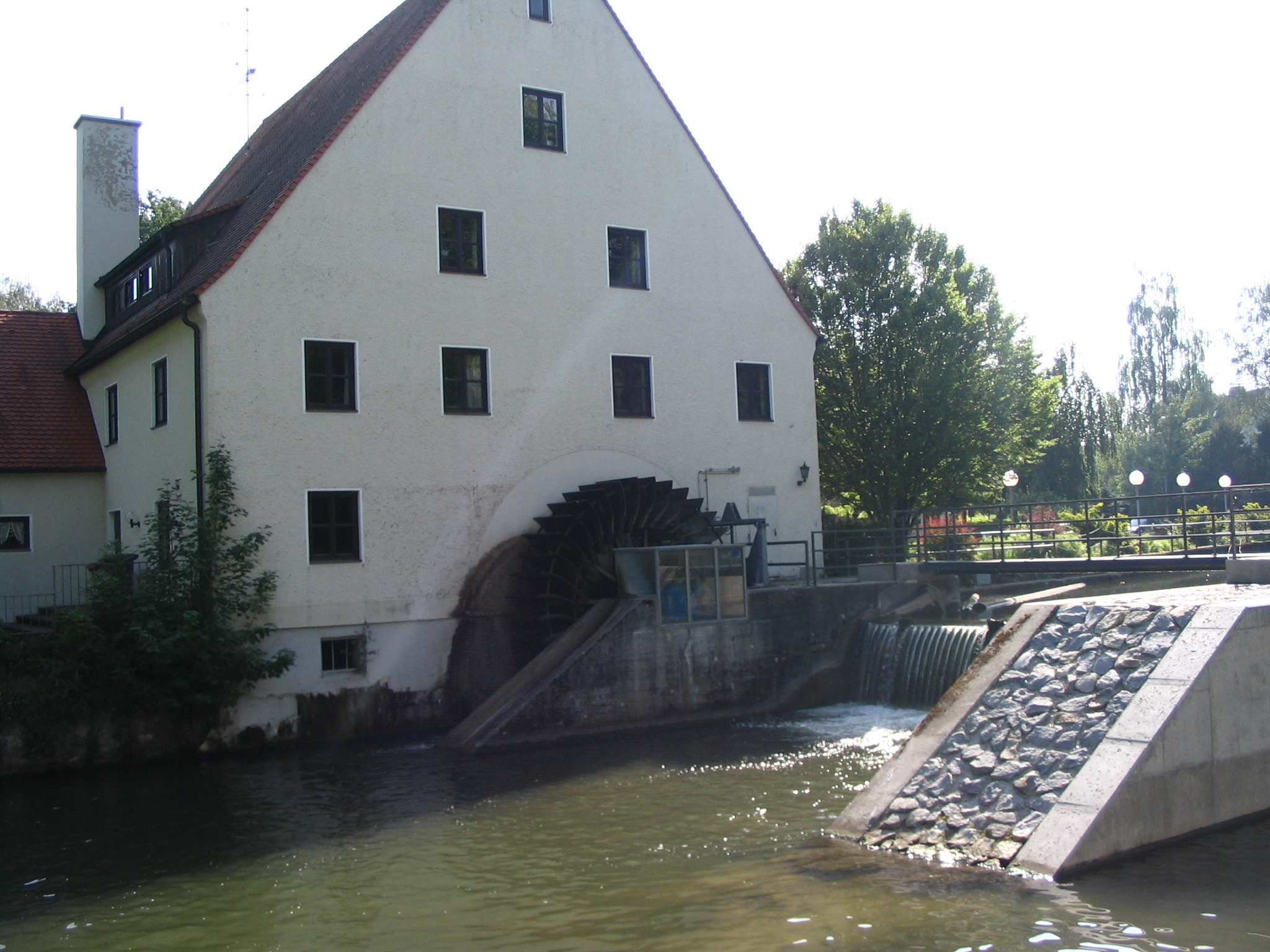
lower mill at the Kammel in Krumbach, today: parish hall St Michael

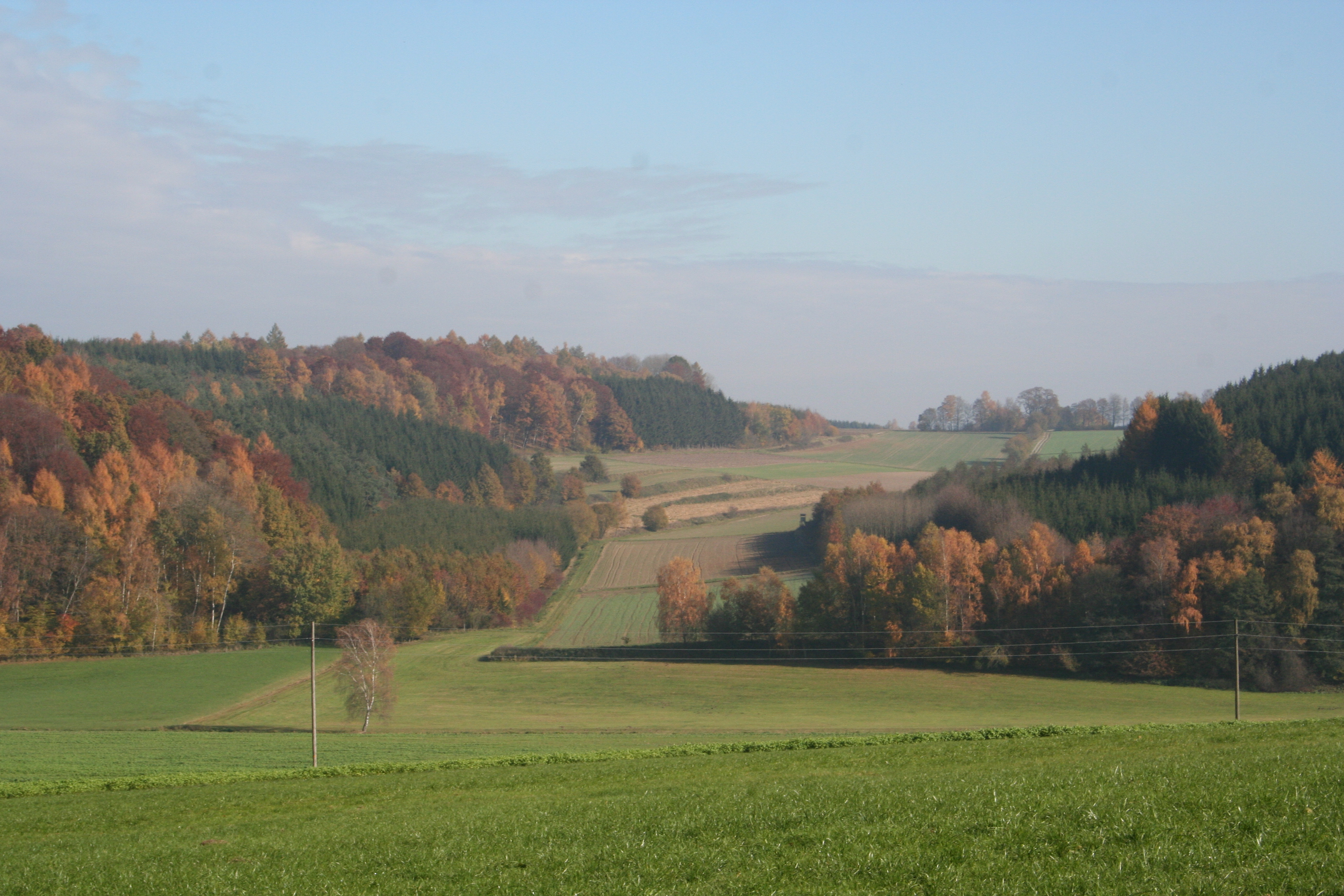
the valley of the Haselbach from west to east

== Miscellaneous ==
- Parallel to the Kammel there is the 71 km long cycle track Kammeltal-Radweg
- From Breitenbrunn to Neuburg an der Kammel the Mittelschwaben Railway runs in the valley of the Kammel
- Of no other river in the district Günzburg so many kilometres have been renaturalised in the last few years as the Kammel

== See also ==
- map of the region passed by the Kammel
- Naichen hammer mill museum
- List of the lakes and rivers in the drainage basin of the Mindel
- List of the municipalities, towns and attractions in the district Günzburg
