= Krähenbach (Kammel) =

River in Germany

Location
- Country: Germany
- State: Bavaria

Physical characteristics
- Mouth
  - location: Kammel
  - coordinates: 48.3708°N 10.3589°E
- Length: 7.4 km (4.6 mi)

Basin features
- Progression: Kammel→ Mindel→ Danube→ Black Sea

Krähenbach is a river of Bavaria, Germany. It is a right tributary of the Kammel in Ettenbeuren (a parish of Kammeltal).

== See also ==
- List of rivers of Bavaria
