= Krummbach =

Krummbach may refer to:

- Krummbach LU, a village in the municipality of Geuensee, canton of Lucerne, Switzerland
- Krummbach (Ablach), a river of Baden-Württemberg, Germany, tributary of the Ablach
- Krummbach (Dreisam), a river of Baden-Württemberg, Germany, tributary of the Dreisam
- Krummbach (Steinhauser Rottum), artificially created stream in Ochsenhausen, Baden-Baden-Württemberg, Germany, tributary of the Steinhauser Rottum

== See also ==
- Krumbach (disambiguation)
