= Offingen (Verwaltungsgemeinschaft) =

- Verwaltungsgemeinschaft
- Location of Offingen within Günzburg district
- Interactive map of Offingen
- Location within Germany Location within Bavaria
- Coordinates: 48°29′N 10°23′E
- Country: Germany
- State: Bavaria
- Admin. region: Swabia
- District: Günzburg
- Seat: Offingen
- Subdivisions: 3 municipalities

Area
  - Total: 38.50 km^{2} (14.86 sq mi)

Population (2025-12-31)
  - Total: 7,425
  - Density: 192.9/km^{2} (499.5/sq mi)
- Time zone: UTC+01:00 (CET)
  - Summer (DST): UTC+02:00 (CEST)
- Website: vgem-offingen.de

Offingen is a Verwaltungsgemeinschaft (municipal association) in the district of Günzburg in Bavaria, Germany. Its seat is in Offingen.

It consists of the following municipalities:

1. Gundremmingen
2. Offingen
3. Rettenbach
