= Krumbach =

Krumbach may refer to:

== Places in Austria ==
- Krumbach, Lower Austria
- Krumbach, Vorarlberg
- a part of Sankt Oswald ob Eibiswald, Styria

== Places in Germany ==
- Krumbach, Bavaria, in the Günzburg district, Bavaria
- Krumbach, Swabia (district), a former district whose capital was Krumbach, Bavaria
- a borough of Asbach, in the Neuwied district, Rhineland-Palatinate
- a borough of Amberg, in the Amberg-Sulzbach district, Bavaria
- a borough of Bad Saulgau, in the Sigmaringen district, Baden-Württemberg
- a borough of Biebertal, in the Gießen district, Hesse
- a borough of Fürth, in the Bergstraße district, Hesse
- a borough of Hohenpolding, in the Erding district, Bavaria
- a borough of Illmensee, in the Sigmaringen district, Baden-Württemberg
- a borough of Kirchroth, in the Straubing-Bogen district, Bavaria
- a borough of Kißlegg, in the Ravensburg district, Baden-Württemberg
- a borough of Lichtenau, in the Mittweida district, Saxony
- a borough of Limbach (Neckar-Odenwald), in the Neckar-Odenwald district, Baden-Württemberg
- a borough of Sauldorf, in the Sigmaringen district, Baden-Württemberg
- a borough of Seßlach, in the Coburg district, Bavaria
- a borough of Tettnang, in the Bodensee district, Baden-Württemberg

== Rivers in Germany ==
- Krumbach (Kammel), in Bavaria, tributary of the Kammel

== See also ==
- Krumbacher
