= Gundremmingen =

- Municipality
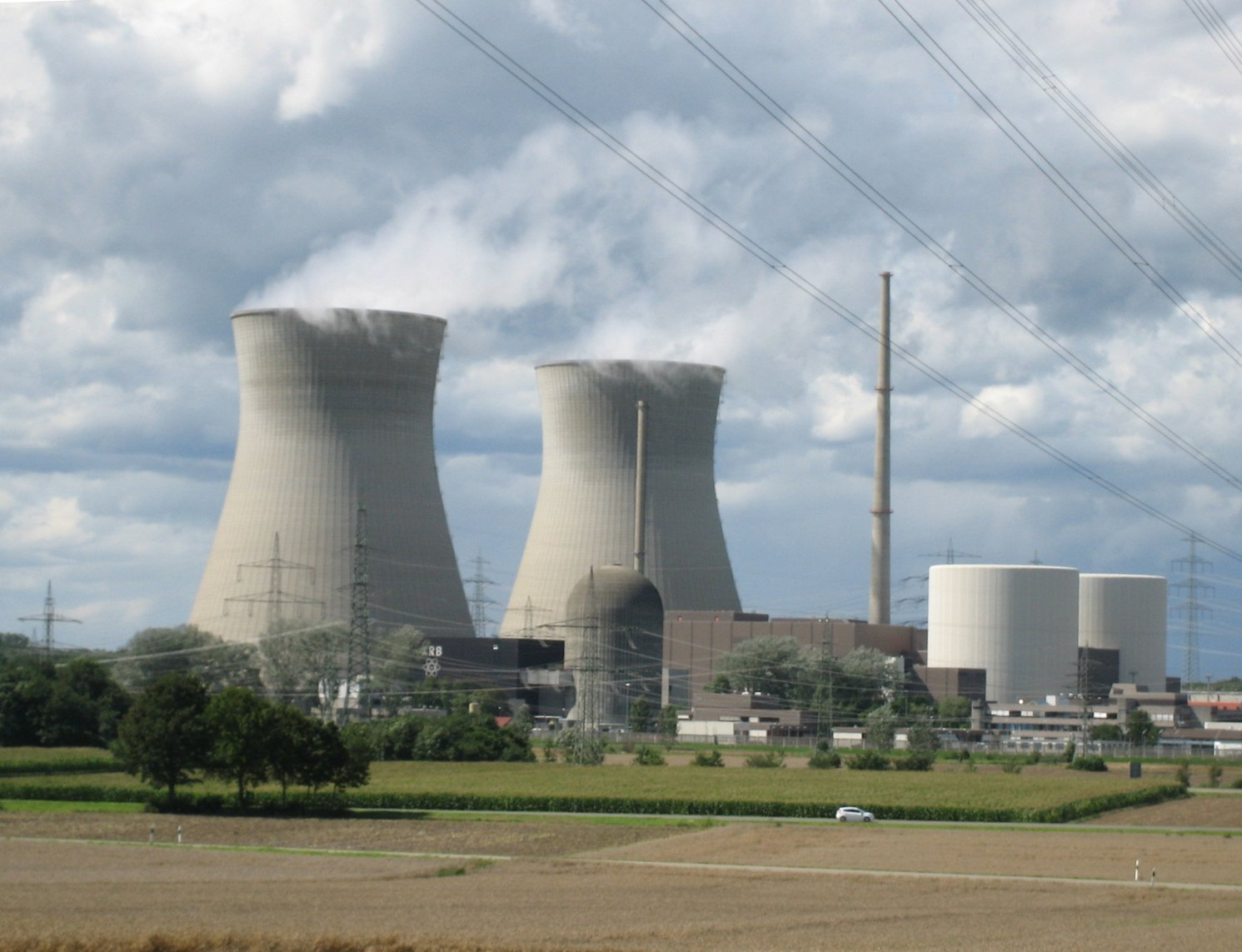
- Gundremmingen Nuclear Power Plant

- Coat of arms

- Location of Gundremmingen within Günzburg district
- Interactive map of Gundremmingen
- Location within Germany Location within Bavaria
- Coordinates: 48°30′N 10°24′E
- Country: Germany
- State: Bavaria
- Admin. region: Schwaben
- District: Günzburg
- Municipal assoc.: Offingen

Government
  - Mayor (2020–26): Tobias Bühler (CSU)

Area
  - Total: 10.84 km^{2} (4.19 sq mi)
- Elevation: 437 m (1,434 ft)

Population (2025-12-31)
  - Total: 1,369
  - Density: 126.3/km^{2} (327.1/sq mi)
- Time zone: UTC+01:00 (CET)
  - Summer (DST): UTC+02:00 (CEST)
- Postal codes: 89355
- Dialling codes: 08224
- Vehicle registration: GZ
- Website: www.gundremmingen.de

Gundremmingen is a municipality in the district of Günzburg in Bavaria in Germany. It is well known for the Gundremmingen Nuclear Power Plant.

== Gundremmingen Nuclear Power Station ==
Gundremmingen is the location of the nuclear power station Kernkraftwerk Gundremmingen, with nominal electrical power 2688 MW.
