= Krumbach (Kammel) =

River in Germany

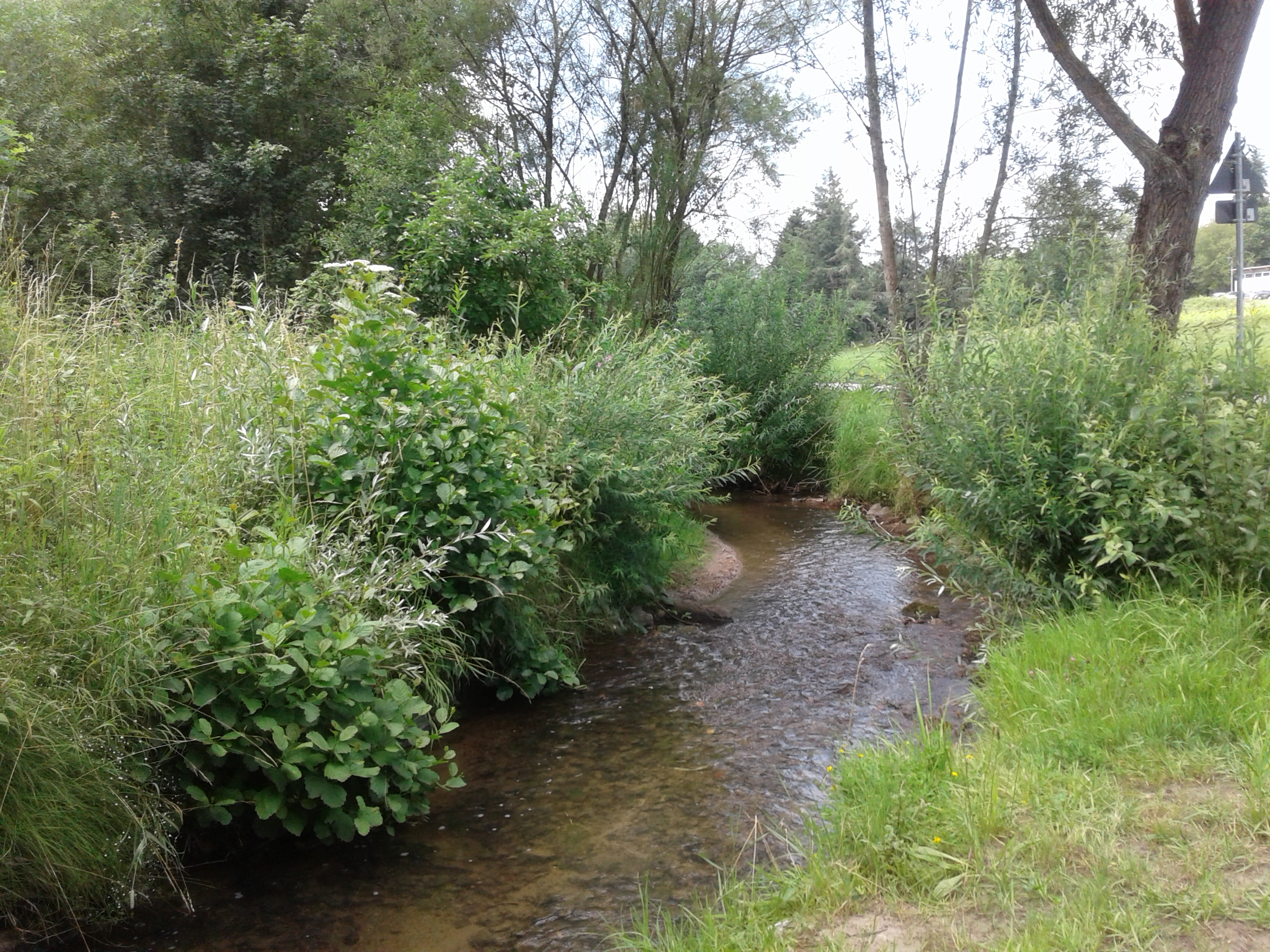
- The Krumbach at the southern edge of the town Krumbach

Location
- Country: Germany
- State: Bavaria

Physical characteristics
- Mouth
  - location: Kammel
  - coordinates: 48.2464°N 10.3624°E
- Length: 12.3 km (7.6 mi)

Basin features
- Progression: Kammel→ Mindel→ Danube→ Black Sea

Krumbach is a river of Bavaria, Germany. It is a left tributary of the Kammel in the town Krumbach.

== See also ==
- List of rivers of Bavaria
