= Neuburg an der Kammel =

- Municipality
- Coat of arms

- Location of Neuburg an der Kammel within Günzburg district
- Interactive map of Neuburg an der Kammel
- Location within Germany Location within Bavaria
- Coordinates: 48°17′N 10°22′E
- Country: Germany
- State: Bavaria
- Admin. region: Schwaben
- District: Günzburg

Government
  - Mayor (2020–26): Markus Dopfer

Area
  - Total: 37.9 km^{2} (14.6 sq mi)
- Elevation: 506 m (1,660 ft)

Population (2025-12-31)
  - Total: 3,285
  - Density: 86.7/km^{2} (224/sq mi)
- Time zone: UTC+01:00 (CET)
  - Summer (DST): UTC+02:00 (CEST)
- Postal codes: 86476
- Dialling codes: 08283
- Vehicle registration: GZ
- Website: www.neuburg-ka.de

Neuburg an der Kammel (German pronunciation: [ˈnɔʏbʊʁk ʔan deːɐ̯ ˈkaml̩], lit. 'Neuburg on the Kammel') is a municipality in the district of Günzburg in Bavaria in Germany, it is over 800 years old.
