= Rettenbach, Swabia =

Rettenbach
- Municipality
- Coat of arms

- Location of Rettenbach within Günzburg district
- Interactive map of Rettenbach
- Location within Germany Location within Bavaria
- Coordinates: 48°28′N 10°21′E
- Country: Germany
- State: Bavaria
- Admin. region: Schwaben
- District: Günzburg
- Municipal assoc.: Offingen

Government
  - Mayor (2020–26): Sandra Dietrich-Kast (CSU)

Area
  - Total: 12.74 km^{2} (4.92 sq mi)
- Elevation: 439–501 m (1,440–1,644 ft)

Population (2025-12-31)
  - Total: 1,691
  - Density: 132.7/km^{2} (343.8/sq mi)
- Time zone: UTC+01:00 (CET)
  - Summer (DST): UTC+02:00 (CEST)
- Postal codes: 89364
- Dialling codes: 08224
- Vehicle registration: GZ

Rettenbach (German pronunciation: [ˈʁɛtn̩bax]) is a municipality in the district of Günzburg in Bavaria in Germany. The following Gemarkungen exist: Harthausen, Remshart, Rettenbach.
