= Kammeltal =

- Municipality
- Coat of arms

- Location of Kammeltal within Günzburg district
- Interactive map of Kammeltal
- Location within Germany Location within Bavaria
- Coordinates: 48°23′N 10°22′E
- Country: Germany
- State: Bavaria
- Admin. region: Schwaben
- District: Günzburg

Government
  - Mayor (2020–26): Thorsten Wick

Area
  - Total: 41.72 km^{2} (16.11 sq mi)
- Elevation: 400–470 m (1,310–1,540 ft)

Population (2025-12-31)
  - Total: 3,361
  - Density: 80.56/km^{2} (208.7/sq mi)
- Time zone: UTC+01:00 (CET)
  - Summer (DST): UTC+02:00 (CEST)
- Postal codes: 89358
- Dialling codes: 08223, 08222, 08225
- Vehicle registration: GZ
- Website: www.kammeltal.de

Kammeltal (German pronunciation: [ˈkaml̩taːl], lit. 'Kammel Valley') is a municipality in the district of Günzburg in Bavaria in Germany.
