= List of states in the Holy Roman Empire (K) =

This is a list of states in the Holy Roman Empire beginning with the letter K: Some historians mark the beginning of the Empire as 800, with the coronation of Frankish king Charlemagne ("Charles the Great").

Name	Type	Imperial circle	Imperial diet	History
Käfernburg (Kevernburg)	County	n/a	n/a	1103: First mentioned; to Schwarzburg; 1160: Partitioned from Schwarzburg; 1184: Inherited Schwarzburg; 1197: Partitioned into Schwarzburg, itself and Hallermund; 1227: Partitioned into itself and Rabenswalde-Wiehe; 1384: Extinct in male line 1387: Sold to Thuringia; 1446: To Schwarzburg-Arnstadt Younger Line
Kaisheim (Kaisersheim)	Abbacy	Swab	SP / RP	1135: Formed; 1346: Imperial immediacy, though not recognised by Bavaria; 1656: Imperial immediacy recognised by Bavaria; 1803: To Bavaria
Kalenberg see: Brunswick-Calenberg	Duchy			
Katzenelnbogen	Lordship; 1138: County	n/a	n/a	11th Century: Formed; 1066: First mentioned as advocates of Prüm Abbey; 1138: HRE Count; 1190: Acquired Hohenstein c. 1215: Partitioned into itself and Hohenstein; 1259: Acquired Dornberg; 1260: Partitioned into Katzenelnbogen Elder Line and Katzenelnbogen Younger Line; 1402: Reunited by Younger Line; 1453: Acquired part of Diez (de) and Eppstein; 1479: Extinct; to Hesse-Marburg
Katzenelnbogen Elder Line	County	n/a	n/a	1260: Partitioned from Katzenelnbogen; 1284: Acquired St Goarshausen; 1402: Extinct; to Katzenelnbogen Younger Line
Katzenelnbogen Younger Line	County	n/a	n/a	1260: Partitioned from Katzenelnbogen; 1283: Acquired Brauback; 1384: Much of the county pledged to the Archbishopric of Mainz; 1402: Renamed to Katzenelnbogen
Kaufbeuren	Imperial City	Swab	SW	1286: Free Imperial City; 1803: To Bavaria
Kaufungen	Abbacy	Upp Rhen	RP	1017: Formed; 1089: Imperial immediacy 1527: Mediatised to Hesse; 1533: To the Hessian Knighthood under Hesse
Kaunitz	1642: County	n/a	n/a	14th Century: First mentioned; possibly a branch of Stosch; 1642: Moravian line made HRE Count; 1699: Moravian line in succession dispute over Rietberg; 1726: Moravian line acquired Rietberg; renamed to Kaunitz-Rietberg
Kaunitz-Rietberg; HRE Prince of Kaunitz, Count of Rietberg & East Frisia, Lord of Esens, Stadesdorf, Wittmund & Melrich	County; 1764: Principality	Low Rhen	WE	1726: Moravian line of the House of Kaunitz acquired Rietberg; 1764: HRE Prince; 1803: Bench of Princes; 1807: To Westphalia; 1813: To Prussia; 1848: Extinct
Kaysersberg (Kaisersberg)	Imperial City	Upp Rhen	RH	1353: Free Imperial City; 1648: To France
Kempten	Abbacy	Swab	EC	752; 1062: Imperial immediacy 1524: HRE Prince-Abbey; 1548: Bench of Spiritual Princes; 1803: To Bavaria
Kempten	1289: Imperial Free City	Swab	SW	1289: Free Imperial City; 1803: To Bavaria
Kerpen and Lommersum	Lordship; 1713: Imperial County	Low Rhen	WE	1288: Territory of Brabant; 1430: To Burgundy; 1477: To the Burgundian Netherlands; 1516: To the Spanish Netherlands; 1710: To Palatinate-Neuburg (within Jülich); 1712: To Schaesberg as fief of Palatinate-Neuburg; 1713: Imperial County; 1786: Imperial immediacy; Bench of Counts of Westphalia; 1794: To France
Kettershausen	Lordship	n/a	n/a	1556: To Fugger-Babenhausen; 1806: To Bavaria
Khevenhüller-Metsch; Khevenhuller-Metsch; Prince of Khevenhüller-Metsch, Count of Hochosterwitz, Baron of Landskron and Wernberg, etc.	County; 1763: Principality	n/a	SC	1751: Line formed by a scion of the Khevenhüller family that inherited Metsch; 1763: HRE Prince; Personalist vote in Bench of Counts of Swabia
Kirchberg; Burgrave of Kirchberg, Count of Sayn and Wittgenstein, Lord of Farnrode	Burgraviate	Upp Rhen	WT	1149: Counts of Kapellendorf invested with the burgraviate of Kirchberg bei Jena; 1294: Partitioned into Kirchberg-Windberg, Kirchberg-Kaulsdorf, Kirchberg-Greiffenberg and Kirchberg-Kapellendorf; 1495: Reunited by Kirchberg-Altenberga; 1714: Acquired Sayn-Hachenburg; 1799: To Nassau-Weilburg
Kirchberg-Altenberga	Burgraviate	n/a	n/a	1427: Partitioned from Kirchberg-Greiffenberg; 1461: Acquired Farnroda; 1495: Renamed to Kirchberg
Kirchberg-Greiffenberg	Burgraviate	n/a	n/a	1294: Partitioned from Kirchberg; 1412: Acquired Kranichfeld; 1427: Partitioned into Kirchberg-Kranichfeld and Kirchberg-Altenberga
Kirchberg-Kapellenberg	Burgraviate	n/a	n/a	1294: Partitioned from Kirchberg; 1304: Sold Kapellenberg to Erfurt; 1362: Acquired Camburg; 1393: Extinct; to Meissen
Kirchberg-Kaulsdorf	Burgraviate	n/a	n/a	1294: Partitioned from Kirchberg; 1357: Extinct; to Weimar-Orlamünde
Kirchberg-Kranichfeld	Burgraviate	n/a	n/a	1427: Partitioned from Kirchberg-Greiffenberg; 1455: Kranichfeld to Gleichen-Blankenhain; 1495: Extinct; to Kirchberg-Altenberga
Kirchberg-Windberg	Burgraviate	n/a	n/a	1294: Partitioned from Kirchberg; 1311: Extinct; to Kirchberg-Kaulsdorf and Kirchberg-Greiffenberg
Kirchberg (not to be confused with Burgraviate above)	County	n/a	n/a	11th Century: Formed; 1087: First mentioned Early history of the counts is unclear; eventually formed the lines Kirchberg-Kirchberg, Kirchberg-Brandenburg and Kirchberg-Wullenstetten in the 12th Century
Kirchberg-Brandenburg	County	n/a	n/a	Partitioned from Kirchberg; 1298: Extinct; to Austria; 1313: To Ellersbach; 1466: To Krafft; 1481: To Rechberg; 1539: To Fugger
Kirchberg-Kirchberg	County	n/a	n/a	Partitioned from Kirchberg; 1366: Extinct; to Matsch; 1399: To Kirchberg-Wullenstetten
Kirchberg-Wullenstetten	County	Swab	SC	Partitioned from Kirchberg; 1399: Acquired Kirchberg-Kirchberg; 1481: Half sold to Bavaria-Landshut; 1503: Landshut half to Austria; 1507: Landshut half to Fugger; 1510: Extinct; rest to Fugger
Kirkel	Lordship	n/a	n/a	1075: First mentioned 1212: Partitioned from Saarwerden; 1242: Extinct; divided between numerous heirs 1250: Most acquired by John of Siersberg who took the name Kirkel; 1386: Extinct; to the Palatinate
Klettgau	County; 1325: Landgraviate	Swab	SC	Originally a gau county of the Carolingian Empire; 1040: To Habsburg; 1280: To Habsburg-Laufenburg; 1410: To Sulz; 1687: To Schwarzenberg; 1806: To Baden
Klingenmünster	Abbacy; 1490: Provostry	Upp Rhen	RP	636 ? 1115: Imperial immediacy 1490: Provost; 1567: To the Palatinate
Knyphausen (Kniphausen)	Barony; 1653: County	n/a	n/a	Part of East Frisia; 1588: Lord of Inhausen and Knyphausen made HRE Baron; 1624: To Oldenburg; 1653: HRE Count; 1667: To Aldenburg; 1738: To Aldenburg-Bentinck; 1807: To Holland; 1810: To France; 1813: To Oldenburg; 1826: To Aldenburg-Bentinck with limited sovereignty 1854: To Oldenburg
Koblenz (Coblenz / Coblence)	Bailiwick of the Teutonic Order	El Rhin	n/a	1216: Teutonic Order received land in fief from the Archbishopric of Trier; 1263: Acquired Elsen; 1313: Acquired Waldbreitbach; 1613: Acquired Morsbroich; 1794: Left-bank territory to France; 1806-9: Rest to Berg and Nassau
Koevorden (Coevorden)	Lordship			
Kolb von Wartenberg (Kolbe)	Lordship	n/a	n/a	12th Century: First mentioned; ministerialis of Franconia; 1699: HRE County; renamed to Wartenberg
Königsbronn	Abbacy	Swab	SP	1303: Formed; 15th Century?: Imperial immediacy 1553: Mediatised to Württemberg; 1710: Abolished
Königsegg (Konigsegg); HRE Count of Königsegg & Rothenfels, Baron of Aulendorf & Stauffen, Lord of Ebenweiler & Wald in Swabia	Lordship; 1621:Barony; 1629: County	Swab	SC	c. 1171: First mentioned as a property of the Lords of Fronhofen c. 1251: Partitioned from Fronhofen; 1381: Acquired Aulendorf; 1595: Acquired Rothenfels; 1621: HRE Baron; 1622: Partitioned into Königsegg-Rothenfels and Königsegg-Aulendorf
Königsegg-Aulendorf	Barony; 1629: County	Swab	SC	1622: Partitioned from Königsegg; 1629: HRE County; 1806: To Württemberg
Königsegg-Rothenfels	Barony; 1629: County	Swab	SC	1622: Partitioned from Königsegg; 1629: HRE County; 1804: To Austria; acquired Boros-Sebiș as fief of Hungary
Königsfeld (Black Forest)				
Konstanz (Constance)	Prince-Bishopric	Swab	EC	585; 1155: HRE Prince of the Empire; 1803: To Baden
Konstanz (Constance)	1192: Imperial Free City	Swab	SW	1192: Free Imperial City; 1548: To Austria; 1805: To Baden
Konzenberg	Lordship	n/a	n/a	1305: To Burgau; 1351: To Halder; 1361: To Waldkirch; 13??: To Villenbach; 13??: To the Bishopric of Augsburg; 1454: To Grafeneck; 1456: To Stain; 1457: to Westernach; 1511: To Knöringen; 1524: To Augsburg; 1530: To Baumgartner; 16??: To ? 1684: To the Bishopric of Augsburg; 1803: To Bavaria
Kornelimünster (Cornelimünster; St Kornelimünster)	Abbacy	Low Rhen	RP	614; 9th Century: Imperial immediacy 1795: To France
Kranenburg	County	n/a	n/a	1255: Partitioned from Cleves; 1277: Extinct; to Cleves
Krautheim	Lordship; 1803: HRE Principality of Krautheim and Gerlachsheim	n/a	n/a	c. 1213: Mentioned as belonging to Lords of Krautheim; 1399: To the Archbishopric of Mainz; 1803: To Salm-Reifferscheid-Krautheim; 1806: To Württemberg
Kreuzlingen	Abbacy	Swab	SP	c. 1125: Formed; 1145: Imperial immediacy 1648: To Switzerland
Kriechingen (Criechingen)	Barony	n/a	n/a	c. 1150: First mention of Lords of Kriechingen, fiefs of Lorraine; 1239: Partitioned into itself and Helfedange; 1295: To Torcheville who assumed the name Kriechingen; 13th Century: HRE Baron; 1557: Partitioned into Kriechingen-Püttlingen-Bacourt and Kriechingen-Homburg-Bruchkastel
Kriechingen-Homburg-Bruchkastel	Barony; 1617: County	Upp Rhen	n/a	1557: Partitioned from Kriechingen; 1617: HRE Count; Imperial immediacy in core lands; Upper Rhenish Circle; 1697: Extinct; to East Frisia; To Wied-Runkel; 1793: To France
Kriechingen-Püttlingen-Bacourt	Barony	n/a	n/a	1557: Partitioned from Kriechingen; 1681: Extinct; to Salm-Reifferscheid
Kronburg	Lordship			1460: Partitioned from Aichen; 1540: Partitioned into Osterberg, Schwabeck and Weissenstein
Kuefstein-Greillenstein; Count of Kuefstein, Baron of Greillenstein, of Hohenkraen, etc.	1709: County (Personalist)	n/a	FR	1602: HRE Baron; 1654?: HRE Count; 1709: Bench of Counts of Franconia (personalist vote)
Kulmbach	Lordship			1057-1234: To Andechs-Meran; 1248: To Counts of Orlamunde; 1340: To Hohenzollern Burgraves of Nuremberg; 1792: To Prussia; 1807: French occupation 1810: To Bavaria
Kyburg (Kiburg)	County	n/a	n/a	11th century: Formed c. 1053: Counts of Winterthur-Kyburg extinct; to Dillingen by marriage 1180: Partitioned from Dillingen; 1218: Acquired left-bank territory of Zähringen; 1273: To Habsburg-Laufenburg by marriage 1274: Partitioned from Habsburg-Laufenburg (Neu-Kyburg); 1379: Most to Austria; 1384: Fief of Bern; 1417: Extinct
Kyrburg	Wildgraviate	n/a	n/a	1258: Partitioned from the Wildgraviate; 1284: Partitioned into itself and Schmidtburg; 1419: Extinct; to Stein
