= Westernach =

Westernach may refer to:

- Westernach (Danube), a river of Baden-Württemberg, Germany, tributary of the Danube
- Westernach (Mindel), a river of Bavaria, Germany, tributary of the Mindel
