= Eßmühler Bach =

River in Germany

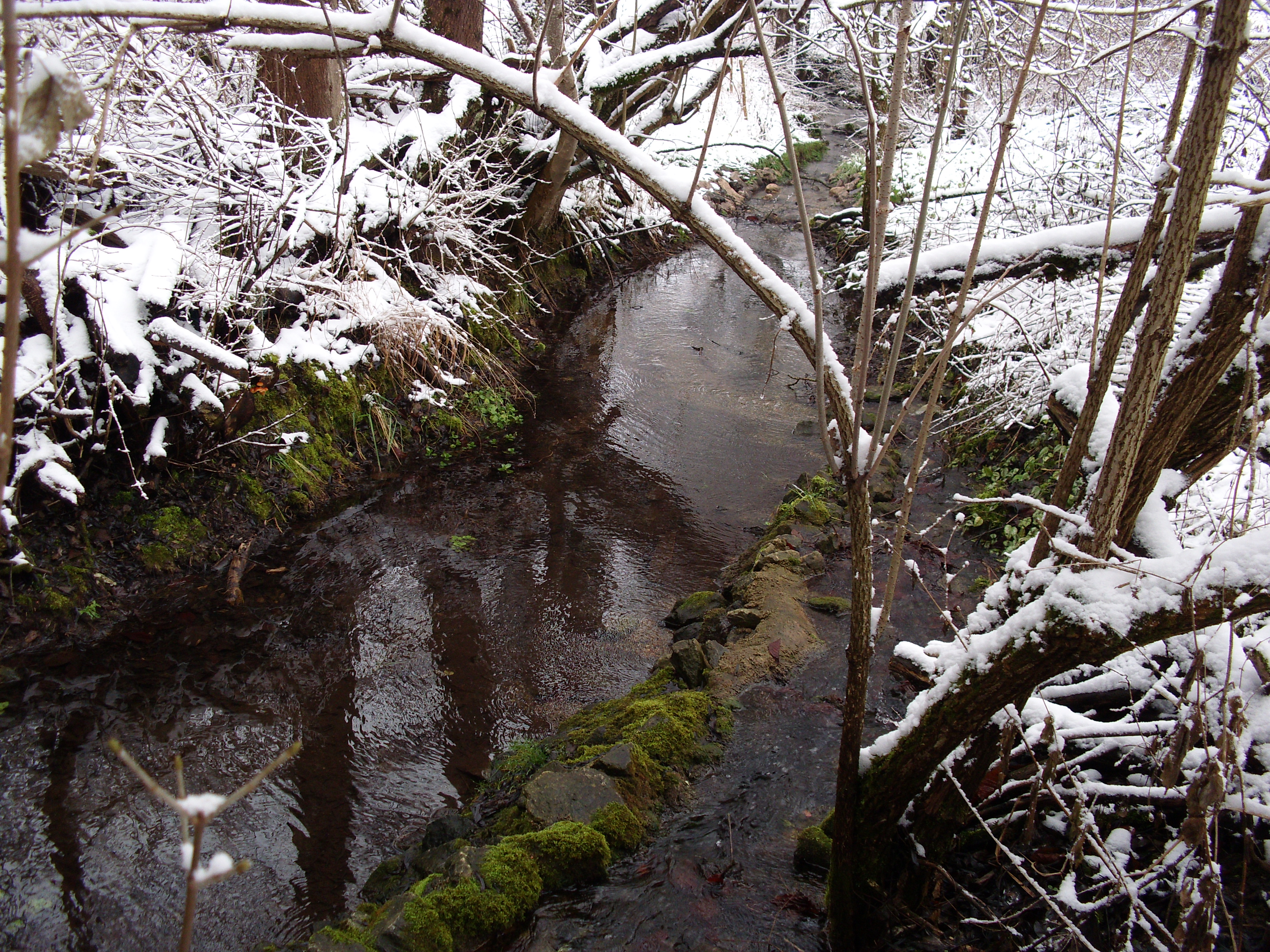

Location
- Country: Germany
- State: Bavaria

Physical characteristics
- Mouth
  - location: Westernach
  - coordinates: 47.9749°N 10.4588°E

Basin features
- Progression: Westernach→ Mindel→ Danube→ Black Sea

Eßmühler Bach is a small river of Bavaria, Germany. It flows into the Westernach near Apfeltrach.

== Gallery ==
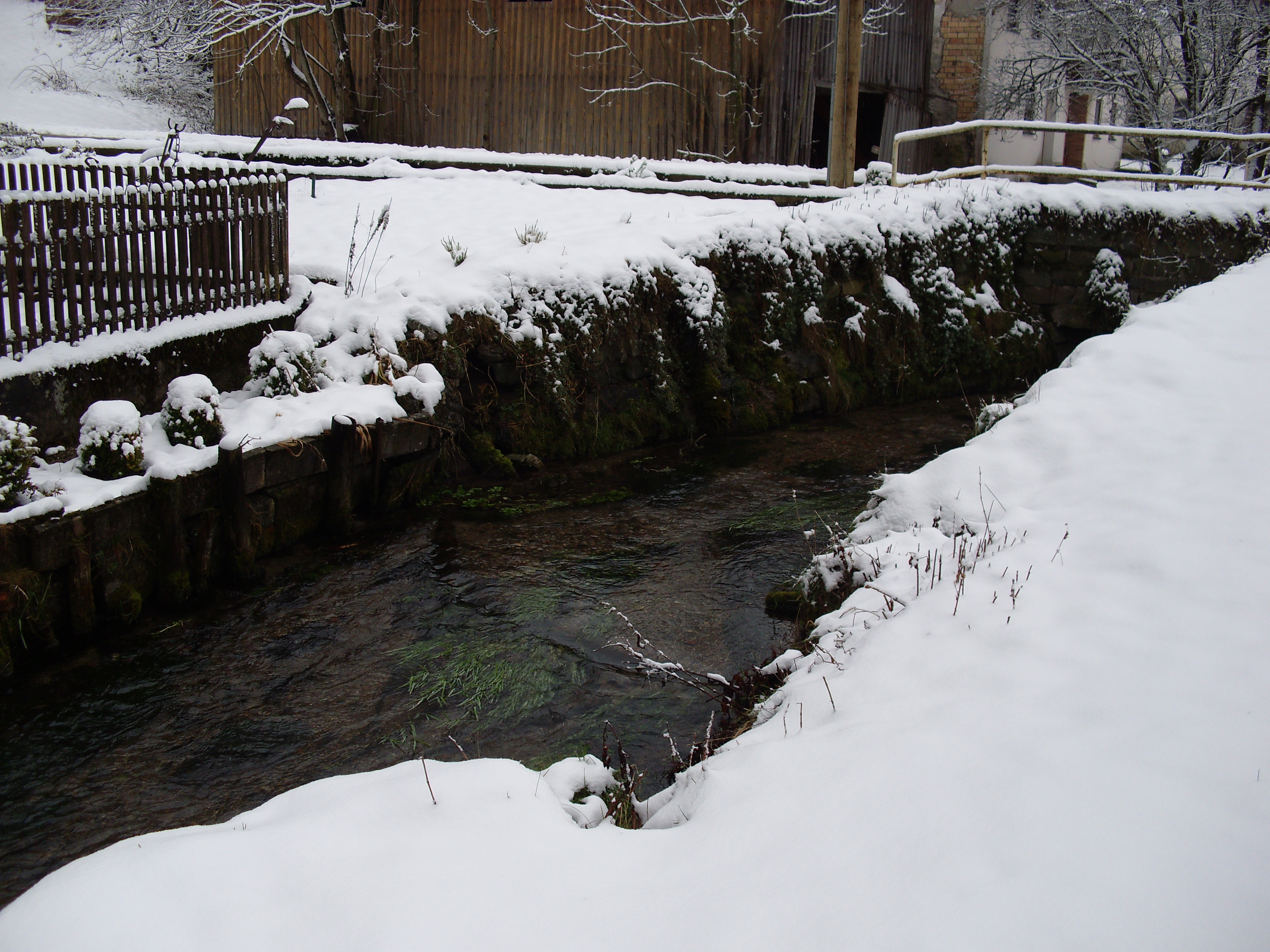
The Eßmühler Bach in Eßmühle (a part of Unteregg)

Flood of the Eßmühler Bach in Eßmühle, spring 2009

== See also ==
- List of rivers of Bavaria
