= County of Kirchberg =

Swabian aristocratic family

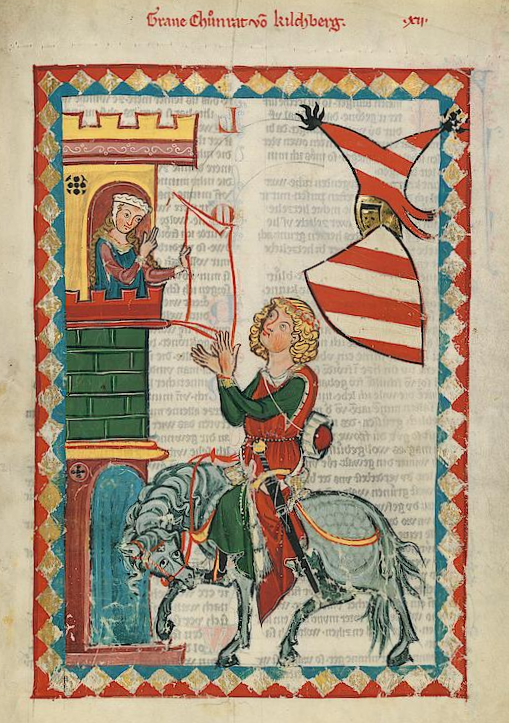
Konrad of Kirchberg as Minnesänger in the Codex Manesse

The County of Kirchberg was a territory, mainly south of Ulm, on the right and left of the Iller, ruled by the House of Kirchberg, a wealthy Swabian aristocratic family. They are difficult to document, but at the end of the early Middle Ages and the beginning of the High Middle Ages they may have had a significance that went beyond regional power. By the end of the 12th century, the family had split into two lines, later into three, becoming impoverished towards the end of the Middle Ages and dying out in 1510 after the sale of their possessions and rights.

The ancestral seat of the Kirchbergers was probably in Unterkirchberg, in what is now the municipality of Illerkirchberg . Towards the end of the 11th century, it was moved up the Iller to Oberkirchberg, where a hilltop castle was built, where the Fugger Castle now stands. The Kirchberg coat of arms, which has not been interpreted satisfactorily, shows a woman (later often a Mohrin) holding a helmet or a lily, later a mitre, in her hands.

== History ==
=== Origins ===
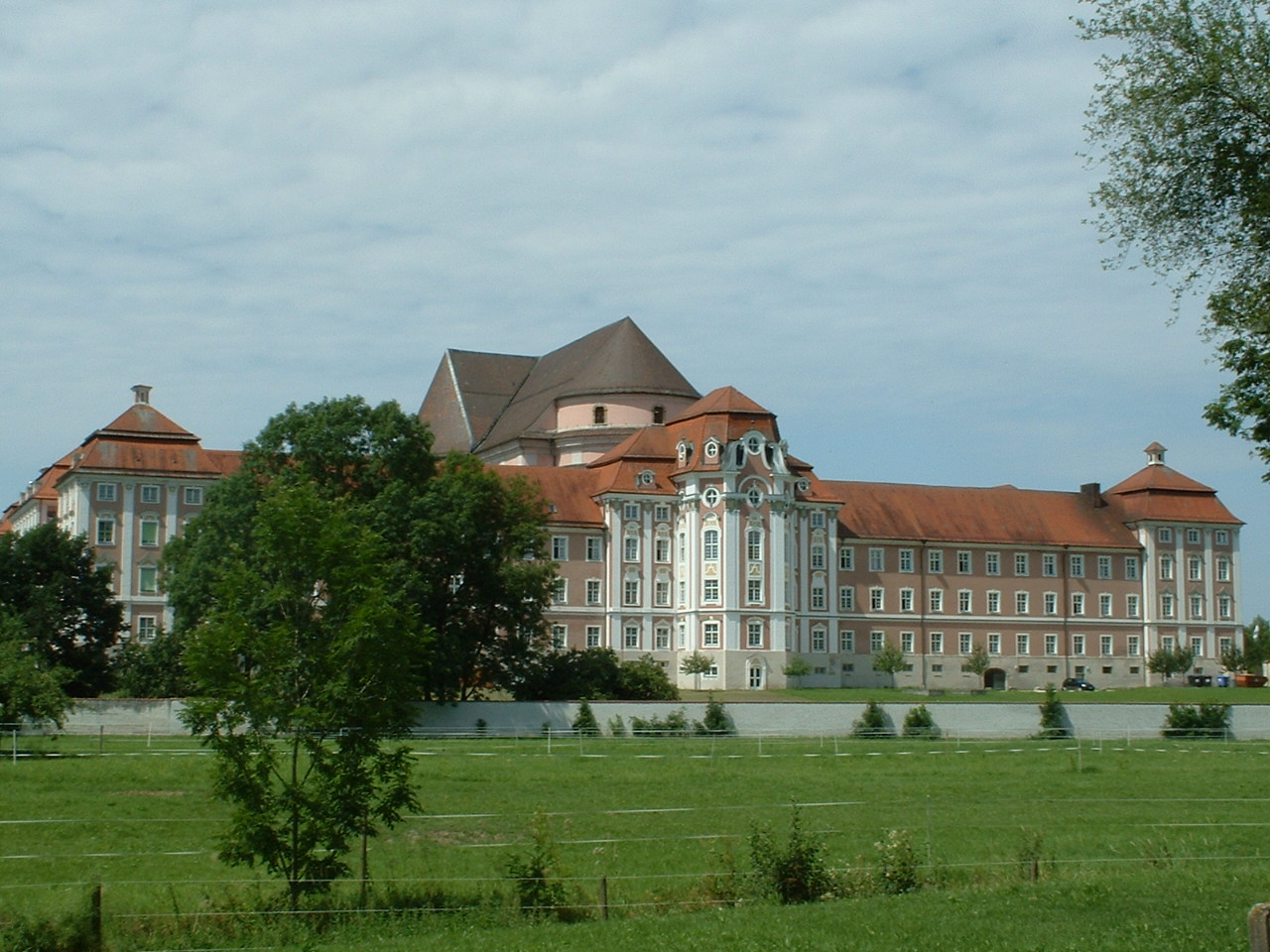
The Wiblingen Abbey, founded by the Counts of Kirchberg.

The origin of the Kirchbergs and their early genealogy cannot be taken seriously historically. The frequent use of the first names Otto and Hartmann could indicate family ties to the Counts of Buchhorn, a branch of the Udalrich line that was wealthy on Lake Constance and had died out in 1089, or to the Hupaldings. A Hartmann is mentioned in 980 as Gaugraf im Illergau. The first documented mention is in 1087, when an Otto de Chirchperg testifies to a donation to the Salvator monastery in Schaffhausen. The foundation and rich endowment of the Wiblingen Abbey in 1093 by the brothers Otto and Hartmann from Kirchberg shows the financial possibilities of the Kirchbergs at that time. The Wiblingen monastery remained the burial place of this noble family until the Kirchbergs died out.

=== Domain ===
The County of Kirchberg was an imperial fiefdom that arose from the eastern parts of the former Rammachgau. The area can be described as an irregular square, the northern border of which is formed by the Danube river from the confluence of the Roth upstream to about Obermarchtal, the eastern border originally probably by the Roth, later by the Iller and the western border by the Riss and the upper reaches of the Schussen. The cornerstones of the irregular southern border are Boos in the south-east, the lower reaches of the Aitrach in the south and the area south of Schussenried in the southwest. In this area, the Kirchberg family had the County rights to rule, enjoyed the corresponding rights of use and had the wildlife sanctuary. Their allodial holdings were concentrated between the Rot and Roth, but also lay partly north of the Danube and east of the Roth. In the High and Late Middle Ages, parts of it went as subfiefs or fiefdoms to the local lower nobility and to the citizens of Ulm.

=== Divisions of the Kirchberg family ===
In the High Middle Ages, probably still in the 12th century, the Kirchbergs split into two, and in 1250 finally into three lines. The reasons for the first division are not documented.

- Kirchberg-Kirchberg: The main line retained its headquarters in Oberkirchberg and the rights of the counts. Count William I died in 1366. His daughter Agnes had been married to Ulrich IV, Lord of Matsch since 1346 and brought her inheritance into this marriage. Parts of the Kirchberg family estate went to this powerful aristocratic family, wealthy in Vinschgau, Engadin, Veltlin and Graubünden, who soon bought the remaining part, the dowry from William I's sister Bertha. As a result, the House of Matsch also temporarily held the additional title of Count of Kirchberg.
- Kirchberg-Brandenburg: Southwest of this is the rule of Kirchberg-Brandenburg. Their center of power was in Dietenheim, which received city rights as early as 1280. From their family castle (probably Regglisweiler Castle) only overbuilt ditches are preserved. The branch seem to have been the most politically active line; representatives of this family appear on royal charters several times. The first documentary evidence of a Kirchberg-Brandenburg (Count Otto) dates to 2 February 1239. According to the chronicle of the Imperial Abbey of Rot (Roth) on the Rot, the line could have split off even earlier. After the serious wounding of Count Hartmann VI in the Battle of Oberndorf (17 April 1298) the Brandenburg estates were confiscated by Albert I of Germany and passed on without regard to the inheritance claims of the surviving Kirchbergs, first to the knights of the Ellerbach family. The last of this branch was abbot Conrad, from the monastery of Allerheiligen/Schaffhausen, who died on 12 March 1322 (1323).
- Kirchberg-Wullenstetten: This line originated in 1250 from an inheritance division made by the brothers Conrad II and Eberhard III. Eberhard was the founder of the Wullenstetten line. His possessions were mainly to the right of the Iller. On 25 January 1322, Eberhard's son, Count Conrad the Elder, was named as having his seat in Wullenstetten. It is possible that the Wullenstetten line became the administrators of the Kirchberg part that had been annexed by the Matsch family and was then returned to the original family. They resided in the family castle on the Oberkirchberg. Kirchberg-Wullenstetten line was able to get back the old Kirchberg possessions as a pledge in 1390; Finally, in 1434, Eberhard von Kirchberg-Wullenstetten was enfeoffed again by Sigismund, Holy Roman Emperor with the county, so that large parts of the Kirchberg family estate came back into the hands of the family.

=== Extinction of the family ===
The last representatives of the count's family were the two cousins William (died around 1489) and Philip from the Wullenstetten line, who shared the inheritance. Both were heavily in debt. William, who was apparently from 1473 personal servant of Eberhard V, Count of Württemberg-Urach, sold his half in 1481 to George, Duke of Bavaria-Landshut, and Philipp in 1498. Duke George was already in possession of the dominions of Weissenhorn and Pfaffenhofen bordering to the east. After George's death in 1503 and the beginning of the Landshut War of Succession, King Maximilian I.the lordships and pledged them in 1507 for the very large sum of 50,000 guilders to the Fuggers, who called themselves Count of Kirchberg and Weisenhorn after being elevated to the hereditary imperial count (1526). Philip had retained some of his Kirchberg estates until his death on August 20, 1510. In November 1510, his daughter and heiress Apollonia and her husband, John, Count of Montfort-Tettnang, sold the Wain estate they had acquired in 1499 .

== Coat of arms ==
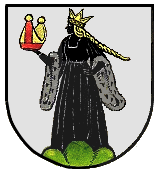
Present coat of arms Oberkirchberg (left) and Illerkirchberg (right)

The first heraldic testimony of the Kirchberg family is a seal from around 1200 that shows three covered towers. It is preserved in a reduced form in the coat of arms of the city of Bruneck. Only from the middle of the 13th century are further pictorial sources available, which always show a crowned female figure carrying either a helmet or a lily in her hands. The heraldic statement of this figure is not clear. From the late 13th century, a lily or helmet was replaced by a miter, which is probably due to the Bishop of Brixen, Bruno of Kirchberg. In the late Middle Ages, the female figure was often depicted as a Moor. In this form it was also added to the Fugger's coat of arms, who bought the county in 1507. Likewise, today's coats of arms of Illerkirchberg and Oberkirchberg go back to the late medieval coats of arms of the Kirchbergs.

== Counts of Kirchberg ==
- There are attestations of two early counts of Kirchberg:
  - Alban (r.c.1028)
  - Berthold (?)

=== House of Kirchberg ===
==== Partitions of Kirchberg under Kirchberg family ====
County of Kirchberg (1st creation) (1090-1367)
| County of Kirchberg- Brandenburg (1195-1298) |
| County of Kirchberg- Brandenburg (1195-1298) | | County of Kirchberg- Wullenstetten (1240-1434) |
| Annexed to the Holy Roman Empire | | County of Kirchberg- Wullenstetten (1240-1434) |
| Annexed to the Holy Roman Empire | Annexed to the House of Matsch (1367-1434) | County of Kirchberg- Wullenstetten (1240-1434) |
| Annexed to the Holy Roman Empire | County of Kirchberg (2nd creation; Wullenstetten line) (1434-1510) |

==== Table of rulers ====
(Note: Despite a general idea of who have ruled the county, there is doubt on some of the co-rulers included here, who may of may have not co-ruled at all.)

| Ruler | Born | Reign | Ruling part | Consort | Death | Notes |
|---|---|---|---|---|---|---|
| Hartmann I | 1063 ? | c.1090 – 1125 | County of Kirchberg | Unknown two children | 1125 aged 61–62 | Brothers and founders of the family and the county. They also founded Wiblingen Abbey. |
| Otto I | c.1065 ? | c.1090 – 1107 | County of Kirchberg | Unknown one child | 1107 aged c.41-42 | Brothers and founders of the family and the county. They also founded Wiblingen Abbey. |
| Hartmann II | c.1095 First son of Hartmann I | 1125 – 1170 | County of Kirchberg | Unknown no children | 1170 aged c.74-75 | Children of Hartmann I, ruled jointly. |
| Eberhard I | 1099; Second son of Hartmann I | 1125 – 1166 | County of Kirchberg | Unknown five children | 1166 aged 66–67 | Children of Hartmann I, ruled jointly. |
| Hartmann III | 1119; First son of Eberhard I | 1170 – 1198 | County of Kirchberg-Brandenburg | Unknown three children | 1198 aged 78–79 | Children of Eberhard I, divided their inheritance. |
| Otto II | c.1120 Second son of Eberhard I | 1170 – 1188 | County of Kirchberg | Unknown five children | 1188 aged 57–58 | Children of Eberhard I, divided their inheritance. |
| Eberhard II | c.1160? First son of Otto II | 1188 – 27 August 1240 | County of Kirchberg | Bertha of Alpeck three children | 27 August 1240 aged 79-80? | Children of Otto II and Hartmann III, ruled jointly. |
| Otto III | c.1160? Second son of Otto II | c.1198 | County of Kirchberg | Unmarried | 1198 aged 37–38? | Children of Otto II and Hartmann III, ruled jointly. |
| Hartmann IV | 1146? Son of Hartmann III | 1198 – 1215 | County of Kirchberg-Brandenburg | ? of Korsch-Eichelberg one child | 1215 aged 68–69 | Left only a daughter, and his inheritance went to his nephew, Otto IV. |
| Otto IV | c.1190 First son of Eberhard II and Bertha of Alpeck | 1215 – 1220 | County of Kirchberg-Brandenburg | Unknown two children | 1220 aged 29–30 | |
| Otto V | c.1210? First son of Otto IV | 1220 – 23 July 1296 | County of Kirchberg-Brandenburg | ? of Maschetten one child | 23 July 1296 aged 85–86? | Children of Otto IV, ruled jointly. After his brother's death, Otto V associated his own son Otto VI and nephew Otto VII (son of Hartmann V) to the co-rulership. |
| Hartmann V | c.1210? Second son of Otto IV | 1220 – 1246 | County of Kirchberg-Brandenburg | ? of Wurttemberg four children | 1246 aged 35–36? | Children of Otto IV, ruled jointly. After his brother's death, Otto V associated his own son Otto VI and nephew Otto VII (son of Hartmann V) to the co-rulership. |
| Otto VI | c.1230? Son of Otto V | 1246 – 23 July 1281 | County of Kirchberg-Brandenburg | ? of Gundelfingen three children | 23 July 1281 aged 50–51? | Children of Otto IV, ruled jointly. After his brother's death, Otto V associated his own son Otto VI and nephew Otto VII (son of Hartmann V) to the co-rulership. |
| Otto VII | c.1230? Son of Hartmann V | 1246 – 1280 | County of Kirchberg-Brandenburg | Unmarried | 1280 aged 49–50? | Children of Otto IV, ruled jointly. After his brother's death, Otto V associated his own son Otto VI and nephew Otto VII (son of Hartmann V) to the co-rulership. |
| Conrad I | c.1200 Second son of Eberhard II and Bertha of Alpeck | 27 August 1240 – 1268 | County of Kirchberg | Bertha of Eberstahl (1201-1264) two children | 1268 aged 67–68? | |
| Conrad II | 1229; First son of Conrad I and Bertha of Eberstahl | 1268 – 2 February 1286 | County of Kirchberg | Elisabeth of Eichen (d.c.1280) three children | 2 February 1286 aged 56–57 | Children of Conrad I, divided their inheritance. |
| Eberhard III | 1231; Second son of Conrad I and Bertha of Eberstahl | 1268 – 1283 | County of Kirchberg-Wullenstetten | Uta of Neuffen five children | 1283 aged 51–52 | Children of Conrad I, divided their inheritance. |
| Conrad III the Elder | 1268; Son of Eberhard III and Uta of Neuffen | 1283 – 1326 | County of Kirchberg-Wullenstetten | Bertha of Vaz (d.1335) three children | 1326 aged 57–58 | |
| Conrad IV | c.1250 Son of Conrad II and Elisabeth of Eichen | 2 February 1286 – 30 March 1315 | County of Kirchberg | Unknown four children | 30 March 1315 aged 64–65 | |
| Hartmann VI | c.1250 Son of Otto VI and ? of Gundelfingen | 23 July 1296 – 23 April 1298 | County of Kirchberg-Brandenburg | Sophia of Wangen (d.c.1330) four children | 23 April 1298 aged 47–48 | After his death in battle, Kirchberg-Brandenburg was annexed to the Holy Roman Empire. |
Kirchberg-Brandenburg was annexed to the Holy Roman Empire
| Conrad V | c.1270 First son of Conrad IV | 30 March 1315 – 1315 | County of Kirchberg | Anna of Taufers (d.21 June 1351) three children | 1315 (after 30 March?) aged 44–45 | Children of Conrad IV, ruled jointly. |
| Bruno | c.1280? Second son of Conrad IV | 30 March 1315 – 1356 | County of Kirchberg | Liutgard of Eichelburg (d.30 March 1356) four children | 1356 aged 75–76? | Children of Conrad IV, ruled jointly. |
| Eberhard IV | c.1280 Son of Conrad III and Bertha of Vaz | 1326 | County of Kirchberg-Wullenstetten | Liutgard two children | c.1326 aged 45–46 | |
| William II | c.1323? Son of Eberhard IV and Liutgard | 1326 – 1 September 1370 | County of Kirchberg-Wullenstetten | Anna of Eichen (d.1369) five children | 1 September 1370 aged 46–47 | |
| Conrad VI | c.1300? First son of Bruno and Liutgard of Eichelburg | 1356 – 1367 | County of Kirchberg | Unmarried | 1367 aged 66–67 | Children of Bruno, ruled jointly. After their deaths, Kirchberg was inherited by William's daughter Agnes, and the County of Matsch. |
| William I | c.1300? Second son of Bruno and Liutgard of Eichelburg | 1356 – 10 August 1366 | County of Kirchberg | Agnes of Teck; 1336 (d.23 September 1384) one child | 10 August 1366 aged 65–66 | Children of Bruno, ruled jointly. After their deaths, Kirchberg was inherited by William's daughter Agnes, and the County of Matsch. |
| Agnes | c.1340? Daughter of William I and Agnes of Teck | 1367 – 12 March 1407 | County of Kirchberg (from 1390 in only parts of Kirchberg) | Ulrich IV, Lord of Matsch six children | 12 March 1407 aged 66–67 | Heiress of Kirchberg, which was transferred to the House of Matsch; however, the family returned much (though not all) of Kirchberg to the original family. |
Kirchberg was annexed to the House of Matsch, though parts of it returned in
| Conrad VII | 1354; First son of William II and Anna of Eichen | 1 September 1370 – 17 January 1417 | County of Kirchberg-Wullenstetten | Anna of Hohenberg-Wildberg (c.1360-1421) c.1380 four children | 17 January 1417 aged 62–63 | Children of William II, ruled possibly jointly. Eberhard may have abdicated to pursue a religious career, and became Bishop of Augsburg. |
| Eberhard V | c.1360 Second son of William II and Anna of Eichen | 1 September 1370 – 1404 | County of Kirchberg-Wullenstetten | Unmarried | 12 August 1413; Wiblingen aged 52–53 | Children of William II, ruled possibly jointly. Eberhard may have abdicated to pursue a religious career, and became Bishop of Augsburg. |
| Eberhard VI | c.1385 Son of Conrad VII and Anna of Hohenberg-Wildberg | 17 January 1417 – 15 May 1440 | County of Kirchberg (in Wullenstetten until 1434; in the whole county since 1434) | Agnes of Werdenberg-Bludenz (d.1436); 1415 five children | 15 May 1440 aged 54–55 | Despite having already inherited the older Kirchberg inheritance (given by the Matsch family after the pledge of 1390, he was only recognized as possessor of the entirety of the county in 1434. |
| Eberhard VII | c.1415 First son of Eberhard VI and Agnes of Werdenberg-Bludenz | 15 May 1440 – 4 July 1472 | County of Kirchberg | Kunigunde of Wertheim (d.1481) eight children | 4 July 1472 aged 56–57 | Children of Eberhard VI, ruled jointly. It's not certain if Conrad VIII associated his son Conrad IX. |
| Conrad VIII | c.1415 Second son of Eberhard VI and Agnes of Werdenberg-Bludenz | 15 May 1440 – 5 June 1470 | County of Kirchberg | Anna of Fürstenberg-Baar (c.1426-1481) five children | 5 June 1470 aged 54–55 | Children of Eberhard VI, ruled jointly. It's not certain if Conrad VIII associated his son Conrad IX. |
| Conrad IX | c.1440? First son of Conrad VIII and Anna of Fürstenberg-Baar | 1450? – 24 May 1460 | County of Kirchberg | 24 May 1460 aged 19–20? | Unmarried | Children of Eberhard VI, ruled jointly. It's not certain if Conrad VIII associated his son Conrad IX. |
| Philip | c.1455? Son of Eberhard VII and Kunigunde of Wertheim | 4 July 1472 – 20 August 1510 | County of Kirchberg | Elisabeth of Schonburg (d.20 July 1491) three children | 20 August 1510 aged 54–55 | Cousins, ruled jointly. Indebted, William sold his part of the land to Bavaria in 1481, and Philip may have done the same with some of his inheritance. The core Kirchberg domains were, however, retained by Philip until his own death. In his own lifetime he saw the Fugger family being nominated as Counts of Kirchberg (1507), and they may have succeeded him after his death. |
| William III | c.1440 Second son of Conrad VIII and Anna of Fürstenberg-Baar | 4 July 1472 – 1481 | County of Kirchberg | Elisabeth of Erbach-Erbach no children | 22 March 1488 aged 57–58 | Cousins, ruled jointly. Indebted, William sold his part of the land to Bavaria in 1481, and Philip may have done the same with some of his inheritance. The core Kirchberg domains were, however, retained by Philip until his own death. In his own lifetime he saw the Fugger family being nominated as Counts of Kirchberg (1507), and they may have succeeded him after his death. |

=== Later counts of Kirchberg ===
In 1536, Charles V, Holy Roman Emperor recreated the title count of Kirchberg for the wealthy Fugger family.

== Other important members of the family ==
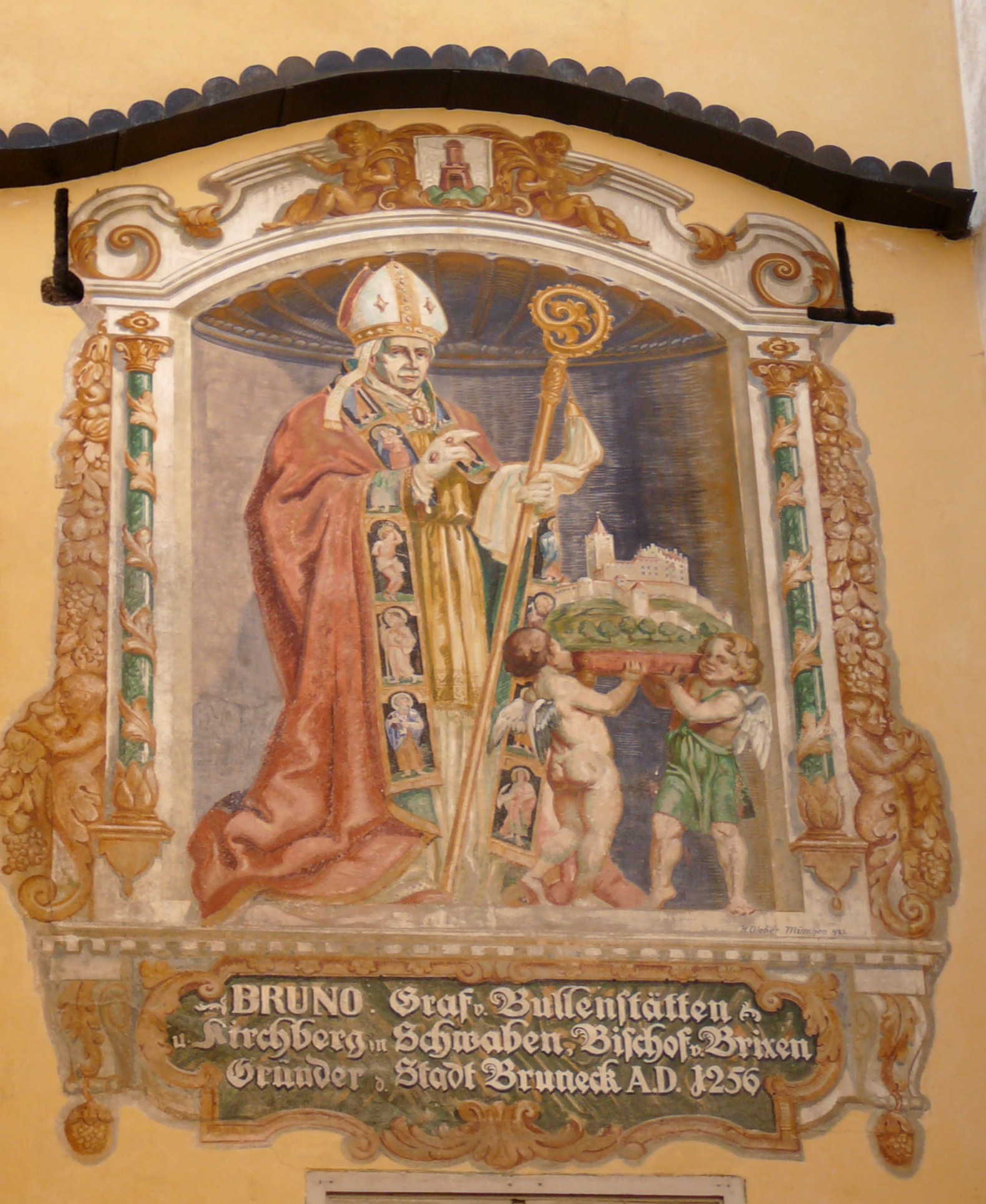
Bishop Bruno in a historical fresco in Bruneck.

- Conrad of Kirchberg: Konrad is shown on the miniature 24r of the Codex Manesse as a knight (Graue Chunrat vo Kilchberg) who is giving his beloved a poem on horseback. 22 stanzas have survived, divided into three summer and three winter songs, which are reminiscent of Neidhart and Tannhäuser in terms of motif and form. The historical person is uncertain; it is either Konrad (documented between 1255 and 1268) or his son of the same name (documented between 1286 and 1315).
- Bruno of Kirchberg, Bishop of Brixen: Bruno's father was most likely Conrad I, Count of Kirchberg. The tradition from Brixen is likely to apply, since both Bruno's brothers Conrad II and Eberhard III of Kirchberg named their firstborn Conrad. According to the necrologists from Stams and Brixen, his mother's name was Bertha. She came from the family of the House of Gorizia. It could be the daughter of Engelbert III, Count of Gorizia (unnamed in 1206 (Strasbourg/Carinthia) in the Gurk historical sources) and Matilda of Andechs. Mathilde's sister was also called Bertha (Abbess of Gerbstett). This would make Bruno's mother a sister of Meinhard III of Gorizia. Presumably through this connection with the people of Gorizia, Bruno came to the cathedral school in Brixen as a child; on the occasion of a certification in Lyon (5 July 1274) he thanks for the education there. Bruno was originally for the bishopric in Trent, which he had to renounce after papal intervention. From 1250 until his death on 24 August 1288 he was bishop of Brixen. The founding of the city of Bruneck and the construction or expansion of Bruneck Castle can be traced back to him. The city's name is variously derived from his first name. He is also a co-founder of the Cistercian Abbey of Stams in the Inn Valley.
- Ida of Toggenburg : According to legend, Saint Ida (* ca. 1156, † ca. 1226) or Idda (as it is usually written in Switzerland) comes from the Kirchberg family. Married to a Count of Toggenburg, she spent many years as a cloistered nun in Au and at Fischingen Abbey. Places of worship are the Idda chapel in the Fischingen monastery and the St. Iddaburg on the former Toggenburg ancestral seat.

== Sources ==
- Wilhelm Werner von Zimmern: Genealogie der Grafen von Kirchberg, Handschrift, Württembergische Landesbibliothek Stuttgart, Cod. Donaueschingen 593a (Digitalisat)
- Sarah Hadry: Kirchberg, Grafen von. In: Historisches Lexikon Bayerns. (online)
- Sarah Hadry, Artikelgruppe "Kirchberg, Grafen von", in: Residenzenkommission der Akademie der Wissenschaften zu Göttingen (Hg.), Dynastisch-topographisches Handbuch. 4. Band: Grafen und Herren im spätmittelalterlichen Reich, Kiel 2012, 757–769.
- Sarah Hadry, Neu-Ulm. Der Altlandkreis (Historischer Atlas von Bayern, Schwaben I/18), München 2011.
- Rudolf Vierhaus (Hrsg.): Deutsche biographische Enzyklopädie. Band ?, 2. Ausgabe. K. G. Saur Verlag, München 2006, ISBN 3-598-25030-4.
- Franz Huter (1955). "Brun". Neue Deutsche Biographie (in German). Vol. 2. Berlin: Duncker & Humblot. pp. 669–670. (full text online).
- Philipp Jedelhauser: Die Abstammung von Bischof Bruno von Brixen, Graf von Kirchberg (Iller) mit Exkurs zu Gräfin Mathilde von Andechs, Ehefrau von Graf Engelbert III. von Görz sowie Stammtafel der Grafen von Görz, in: Adler, Zeitschrift für Genealogie und Heraldik, 28. Band, Heft 6–7, Wien April/September 2016, S. 277–341, siehe S. 278–303, zu Grafen von Kirchberg v. a. Anm. 96–109. Gibt es auch als Buch, 2. überarbeitete Auflage 1217, ISBN 978-3-00-0524899.
