= House of Matsch =

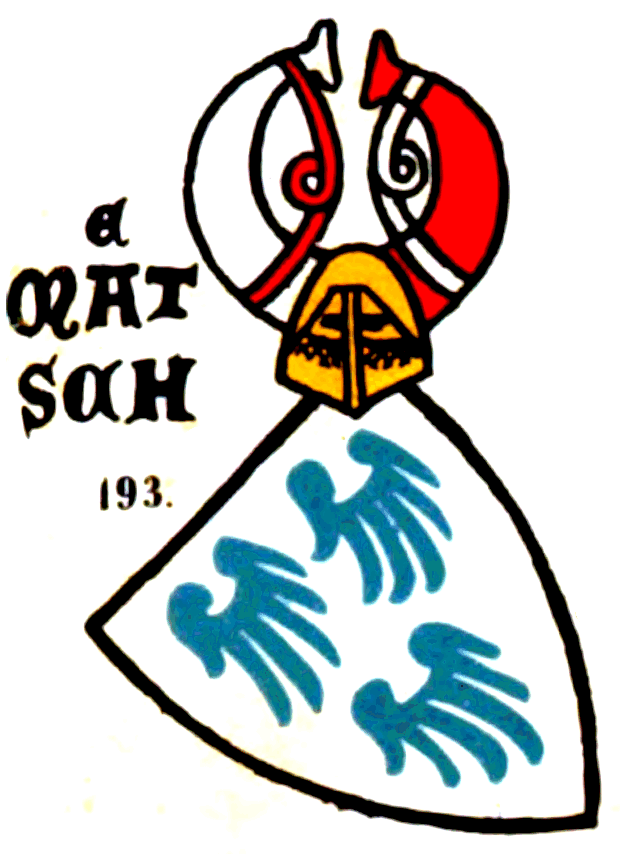
Matsch coat of arms Zurich Armorial c. 1340

The House of Matsch, also written Maetsch, Mätsch, Metsch or Mazzo (Italian) is an old Swiss-Austrian noble family. Their origin is uncertain; they may have come from the Upper Valtellina from the village of Mazzo or may have been a sideline of the lords of Tarasp. The seats of the lords of Matsch were the castles of Obermatsch and Untermatsch in the Matscher Tal (Matsch Valley, Val di Mazia). Later they captured the Churburg at Schluderns in the Vinschgau (Venosta) valley and turned that into their main residence. For a time the lords of Matsch were one of the most powerful noble families in the Vinschgau and in present-day Graubünden.

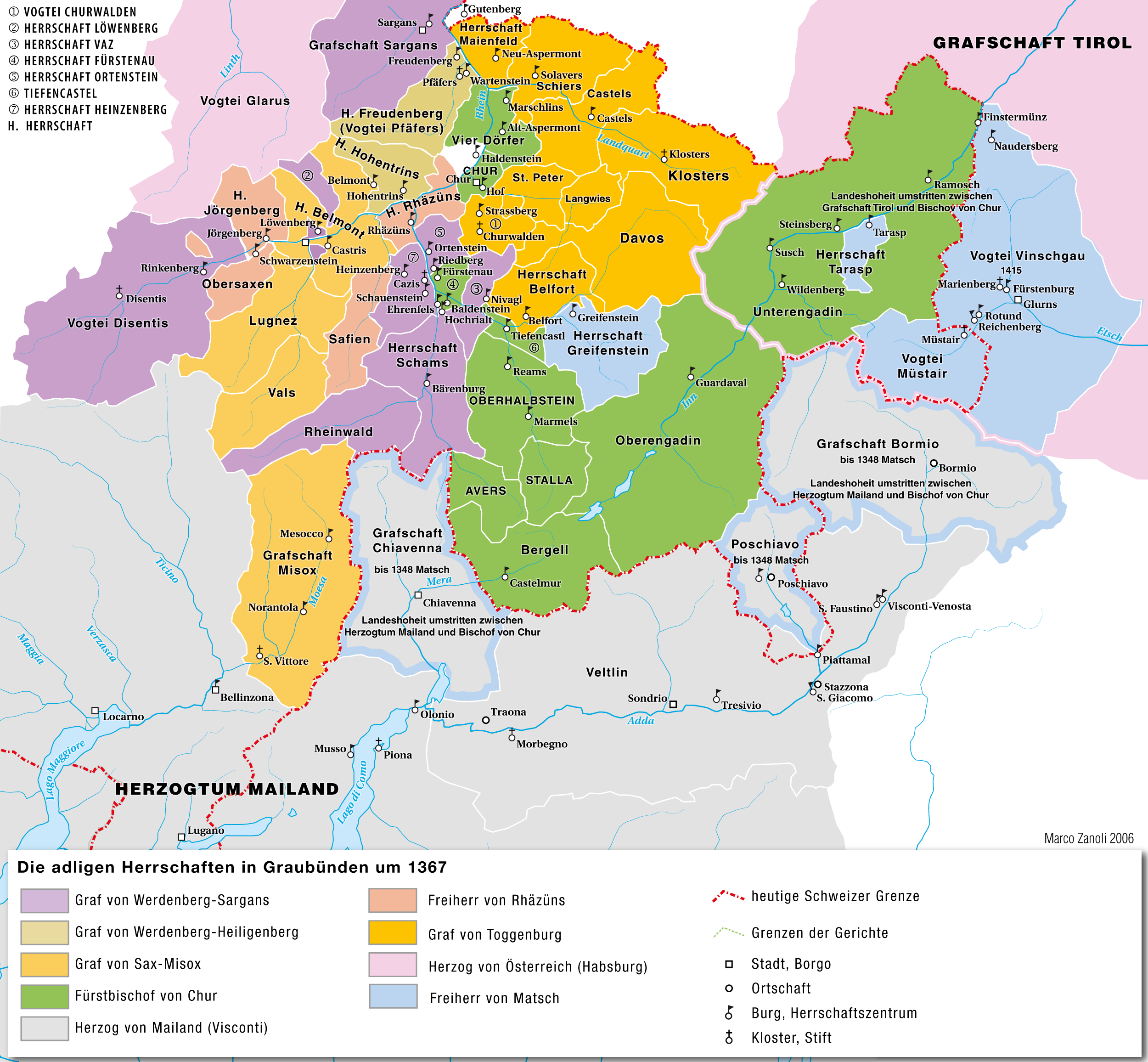
The nobility in today's canton of Graubünden in the middle of the 14th century

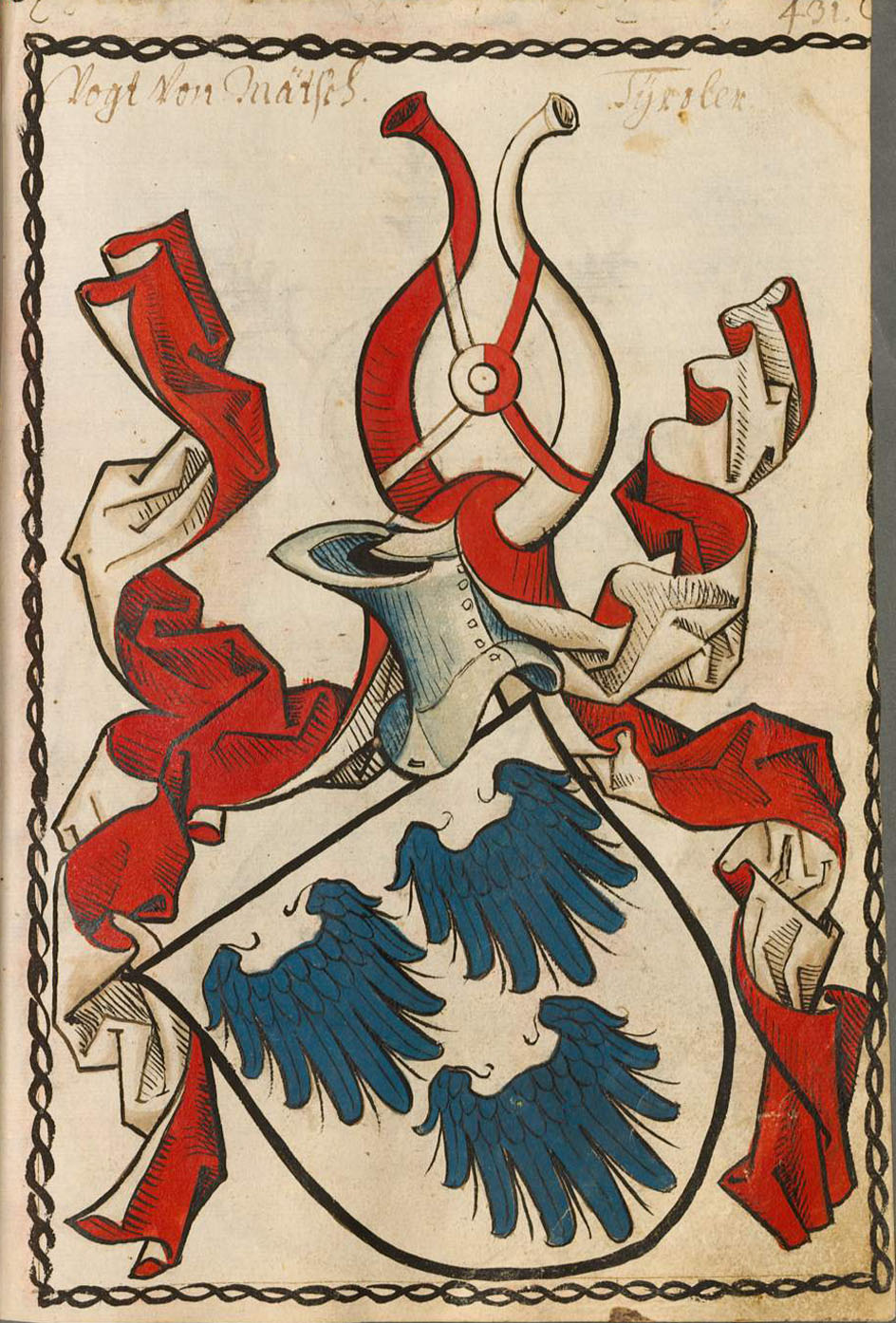
Coat of arms of the family in the Scheibler Armorial, 1450–1480

== History ==
The Matsch were documented for the first time around the middle of the 12th century. A certain Egino I von Matsch (*c.1160) is regarded as the founder of the family. The Matsch officiated as bailiffs over the monasteries of Marienberg in Burgeis and St. John in Müstair. Later they also acquired the bailiwicks over the subjects of the bishop of Chur in Vinschgau, Münstertal, in the Lower Engadin and in Puschlav. The Matsch were almost constantly feuding with the bishops of Chur, of whom the Matsch were ministeriales.

The Matscher's own estates were in Vinschgau, Veltlin, Münstertal, Puschlav ( mines) and around Tarasp. In the 13th and 14th centuries, they came into the possession of the Lordship of Vaduz for a time as a pledge. They were also able to take possession of the castles and estates of Reichenberg, Ramosch, Ardez, Greifenstein, Alt-Süns in Domleschg and Klingenhorn near Malans. In 1338 they took over the courts of Schiers and Castels in the Prättigau. A long-standing dispute between the Counts of Toggenburg and the Matsch family over the ownership of the two courts was only resolved through the marriage of Elizabeth of Matsch to Frederick VII, Count of Toggenburg. Through the marriage, the Matsch were drawn into the Old Zurich War. In 1348 the family lost the bailiwicks of Chiavenna, Bormio and the Puschlav to the Duchy of Milan.

Like many other Graubünden noble families, the Matsch family was constantly involved in feuds and conflicts with other families and the bishops of Chur.

Ulrich IV, Lord of Matsch acquired the County of Kirchberg near Ulm, through his wife Agnes in 1366, and therefore held the title Count of Kirchberg. He was also Vogt of Matsch. From Ulrich IV onwards, some members of the family were also provincial governors of Tyrol; the last representative of the family, Gaudenz, Lord of Matsch (1436–1504), belonged to the council of Sigismund, Archduke of Austria, regent of Tyrol and Further Austria. In 1487 he fell out of favor and, as a fugitive, lost his possessions through confiscation and pledging.

Most of the Matsch possessions in today's South Tyrol fell to the Barons von Trapp .

== Coat of arms ==
The coat of arms of the von Matsch family has three transverse blue eagle wings in silver. On the helmet with red and silver covers a red and silver inturned hifthorn with shackles in mixed colors. It can be found under the original spelling "MAeTSCH" on the Zurich coat of arms roll.

== Lords of Matsch ==
=== House of Matsch ===
Ruler	Born	Reign	Ruling part	Consort	Death	Notes
Hartwig I	c.1120?	c.1160 – 1167	Lordship of Matsch	Unknown two children	1167 aged 46–47?	Founder of the family (and the lordship).
Egino I	c.1140? First son of Hartwig I	1167 – 1192	Lordship of Matsch	Matilda two children	1192 aged 51–52?	Children of Hartwig I, ruled jointly. Ulrich's son Arnold was Bishop of Chur.
Ulrich I	c.1140? Second son of Hartwig I	1167 – 1192	Lordship of Matsch	Unknown one child	1192 aged 51–52?	Children of Hartwig I, ruled jointly. Ulrich's son Arnold was Bishop of Chur.
Egino II	c.1180? Son of Egino I and Matilda	1192 – 25 November 1238	Lordship of Matsch	Adelaide of Wangen two children	25 November 1238 aged 57–58?	
Hartwig II	1214; Son of Egino II and Adelaide of Wangen	25 November 1238 – 20 December 1249	Lordship of Matsch	Sophia of Moosberg two children	20 December 1249 aged 34–35?	
Albero	c.1240 First son of Hartwig II and Sophia of Moosberg	20 December 1249 – 10 January 1280	Lordship of Matsch	Adelaide of Rumus no children Sophia of Velthurns (d.10 August 1308); 14 March 1263 three children	10 January 1280 aged 39–40	Children of Hartwig II, ruled jointly.
Egino III	c.1240? Second son of Hartwig II and Sophia of Moosberg	20 December 1249 – 1277	Lordship of Matsch	Adelaide of Montfort three children	1277 aged 36–37?	Children of Hartwig II, ruled jointly.
Egino IV	c.1270 Son of Egino III and Adelaide of Montfort	10 January 1280 – 1341	Lordship of Matsch	Clara of Homberg; 1305 three children	1341 aged 70–71	Cousins, ruled jointly. Ulrich II's sister Euphemia was Countess of Gorizia.
Ulrich II	c.1270 Son of Albero and Sophia of Velthurns	10 January 1280 – 9 July 1309	Lordship of Matsch	Margaret of Vaz (d.1343); 29 October 1295 three children	9 July 1309 aged 38–39	Cousins, ruled jointly. Ulrich II's sister Euphemia was Countess of Gorizia.
Ulrich III	c.1295 Son of Ulrich II and Margaret of Vaz	1341 – 25 October 1366	Lordship of Matsch	Adelaide of Werdenberg (c.1300/10-1365); 21 March 1322 one child	25 October 1366 aged 70–71	Cousins, ruled jointly.
Hartwig III	c.1305 First son of Egino IV and Clara of Homberg	1341 – 1 February 1360	Lordship of Matsch	Unmarried	1 February 1360 aged 54–55	Cousins, ruled jointly.
John I	c.1305 Second son of Egino IV and Clara of Homberg	1341 – 1360	Lordship of Matsch	Unmarried	c.1360 aged 54–55	Cousins, ruled jointly.
Ulrich IV	c.1325 Son of Ulrich III and Adelaide of Werdenberg	25 October 1366 – 28 September 1402	Lordship of Matsch (with County of Kirchberg, de facto until 1390, de jure from 1390)	Agnes of Kirchberg I (d.12 March 1401/07) six children	28 September 1402 aged 76–77	Since 1366 Ulrich IV acquired (by inheritance) the County of Kirchberg. However, in 1390, the family returned back the majority of the Kirchberg lands they had acquired. They kept the title Count of Kirchberg for themselves, at least until 1434. From 1390, he associated his eldest sons to the government: Ulrich V and John II, and both predeceased him.
Ulrich V	c.1360 First son of Ulrich IV and Agnes of Kirchberg I	1390 – 30 July 1396	Lordship of Matsch (with County of Kirchberg, de facto until 1390, de jure from 1390)	Kunigunde of Montfort-Tettnang (d.1429) c.1390 four children	30 July 1396 aged 35–36	Since 1366 Ulrich IV acquired (by inheritance) the County of Kirchberg. However, in 1390, the family returned back the majority of the Kirchberg lands they had acquired. They kept the title Count of Kirchberg for themselves, at least until 1434. From 1390, he associated his eldest sons to the government: Ulrich V and John II, and both predeceased him.
John II	c.1360 Second son of Ulrich IV and Agnes of Kirchberg I	1390 – 1397	Lordship of Matsch (with County of Kirchberg, de facto until 1390, de jure from 1390)	Margaret of Rhazuns (d.1437) one child	1397 aged 36–37	Since 1366 Ulrich IV acquired (by inheritance) the County of Kirchberg. However, in 1390, the family returned back the majority of the Kirchberg lands they had acquired. They kept the title Count of Kirchberg for themselves, at least until 1434. From 1390, he associated his eldest sons to the government: Ulrich V and John II, and both predeceased him.
Ulrich VI	c.1370 Third son of Ulrich IV and Agnes of Kirchberg I	28 September 1402 – 1444	Lordship of Matsch (with County of Kirchberg, de jure until 1434)	Barbara of Starkenberg (d.1430); 1415 three children	1444 aged 73–74	Ulrich VI associated his nephews Ulrich VII and William to the co-rulership, and both predeceased him. In 1434, the return of the County of Kirchberg to the original family was officialized by the Holy Roman Emperor. They probably stopped styling themselves as Counts of Kirchberg from this point onwards. During Ulrich VI's reign, his sister Elizabeth of Matsch held control, as widow, of the County of Toggenburg, increasing the influence of the family.
Ulrich VII	c.1390 First son of Ulrich V and Kunigunde of Montfort-Tettnang	28 September 1402 – 1431	Lordship of Matsch (with County of Kirchberg, de jure until 1434)	1431 aged 40–41	Unmarried	Ulrich VI associated his nephews Ulrich VII and William to the co-rulership, and both predeceased him. In 1434, the return of the County of Kirchberg to the original family was officialized by the Holy Roman Emperor. They probably stopped styling themselves as Counts of Kirchberg from this point onwards. During Ulrich VI's reign, his sister Elizabeth of Matsch held control, as widow, of the County of Toggenburg, increasing the influence of the family.
William	c.1390 Second son of Ulrich V and Kunigunde of Montfort-Tettnang	28 September 1402 – 1429	Lordship of Matsch (with County of Kirchberg, de jure until 1434)	Anna of Nogarelis no children	1429 aged 38–39	Ulrich VI associated his nephews Ulrich VII and William to the co-rulership, and both predeceased him. In 1434, the return of the County of Kirchberg to the original family was officialized by the Holy Roman Emperor. They probably stopped styling themselves as Counts of Kirchberg from this point onwards. During Ulrich VI's reign, his sister Elizabeth of Matsch held control, as widow, of the County of Toggenburg, increasing the influence of the family.
Ulrich VIII	c.1390 Son of John II and Margaret of Rhazuns	1444 – 1461	Lordship of Matsch	Tyla of Freundberg no children	1461 aged 70–71	
Ulrich IX	1419; Son of Ulrich VI and Barbara of Starkenberg	1461 – 1489	Lordship of Matsch	Agnes of Kirchberg II (d.1472) four children	1489 aged 69–70	Son of Ulrich VI. Ruled with his cousin since 1444.
Gaudenz	1436; Son of Ulrich IX and Agnes of Kirchberg II	1489 – 1504	Lordship of Matsch	Hippolyte of Simonetta three children	1504	Left no descendants; Through his sister Barbara, the Matsch possessions fell to the Barons von Trapp.

== Family tree ==
Descent (among others after Justinian Ladurner):

- 1. Hartwig I of Matsch († after 1167).
  - 1. Ulrich I of Matsch (* 1161).
    - 1. Arnold von Matsch († 1221), Bishop of Chur (from 1209/10).
  - 2. Egino I. Vogt von Matsch and the monastery of Marienberg (1160-1192); Heir of the Matsch bailiffs.
    - 1. Egino II Vogt von Matsch and Marienberg, (* 1189; † November 25, 1238) ∞ Adelheid von Wangen, daughter of Albero von Wangen.
      - 1. Hartwig II Vogt von Matsch and Marienberg (* 1214; † December 20, 1249) ∞ Sophie von Moosburg.
        - 1. Albero I Vogt von Matsch (* 1242; † Jan. 10, 1280) ∞ Sophie von Velturns († after Aug. 10, 1308), daughter of Hugo von Velturns and Elisabeth von Eppan († 1273); their father was Ulrich, Count of Eppan († after 1233) from the noble family of Eppan .
          - 1. Ulrich II Vogt von Matsch (1273–1328) ∞ Margaretha of Vaz († after 1343), daughter of Walter V Herr von Vaz (from the Barons von Vaz family ), and the Liukarde von Kirchberg († May 24, 1326); whose parents were Eberhard III, Count von Kirchberg († before 1283) and Uta von Neuffen (from the Neuffen family).
            - 1. Offmei Utehild von Matsch (* 1301; † after 1353) ∞ Albert II, Count of Gorizia († 1327).
            - 2. Ulrich III. Vogt von Marienberg and Chur, pledgee of Vaduz and Greifenstein († Oct. 25, 1366) ∞ Adelheid von Werdenberg († 1365) from the Alpeck side line of the Counts of Werdenberg-Sargans .
              - 1. Ulrich IV Vogt von Matsch and first Count of Kirchberg (1349–1402), Governor of Tyrol 1361–1363 ∞ Agnes Countess of Kirchberg († 1401).
                - 1. Ulrich V. († 1396) ∞ Cunigunde Countess of Monfort-Tetnang.
                  - 1. Ulrich VII (1396-1431), Governor of Tyrol 1410-1411 and 1429-1431.
                  - 2. Wilhelm († 1429), ducal Governor of Trento 1408, governor of Tyrol 1417-1429.
                - 2. Johann II († 1397) ∞ Margareth, Baroness of Rhäzüns.
                  - 1. Ulrich VIII (1396–1461), governor of Tyrol 1431–1448, 1446–1448 also steward ∞ Teela von Freundsberg († 1439).
                - 3. Elisabeth († after 1443) ∞ Frederick VII Count of Toggenburg († 1436).
                - 4. Ulrich VI Count of Matsch († 1444) ∞ Barbara von Starkenberg († 1425); Daughter of Sigmund von Starkenberg († 1401) and Osanna von Ems († after 1418) [3] († 1407), granddaughter of the knight Ulrich I von Ems from the house of the Lords of Ems and a daughter from the noble family Schellenberg .
                  - 1. Ulrich IX Count of Kirchberg and Matsch (1419–1489), governor of Tyrol 1471–1476 ∞ Agnes Countess of Kirchberg-Udalriching and Werdenberg-Sargans (4th great-granddaughter of the above-mentioned Eberhard III. of Kirchberg and Uta von Neuffen).
                    - 1. Gaudenz von Matsch (1436-1504), governor of Tyrol 1478-1482, steward and general in the Venetian War of 1486; last male offspring of the Matscher.

== Important members of the family ==
- Egino I of Matsch (1160–1192)
- Arnold of Matsch, Bishop of Chur (1210–1221)
- Elizabeth of Matsch (died after 1443), later widow of Frederick VII, the last Count of Toggenburg
- Gaudenz of Matsch (1436–1504)

== Sources ==
- Justinian Ladurner, Die Vögte von Matsch, später auch Grafen von Kirchberg, in: Zeitschrift des Ferdinandeums für Tirol und Vorarlberg, 1st Section: Issue 16 (1871), pp. 5–292; 2nd Section: Issue 17 (1872), pp. 1–235; 3rd Section: Issue 18 (1874), pp. 7–158.
