= Fronhofen =

- Municipality
- Coat of arms

- Location of Fronhofen within Rhein-Hunsrück-Kreis district
- Interactive map of Fronhofen
- Location within Germany Location within Rhineland-Palatinate
- Coordinates: 49°59′30″N 7°27′56″E
- Country: Germany
- State: Rhineland-Palatinate
- District: Rhein-Hunsrück-Kreis
- Municipal assoc.: Simmern-Rheinböllen

Government
  - Mayor (2022–27): Michael Gerhardy

Area
  - Total: 3.71 km^{2} (1.43 sq mi)
- Elevation: 370–408 m (1,214–1,339 ft)

Population (2025-12-31)
  - Total: 246
  - Density: 66.3/km^{2} (172/sq mi)
- Time zone: UTC+01:00 (CET)
  - Summer (DST): UTC+02:00 (CEST)
- Postal codes: 55471
- Dialling codes: 06761
- Vehicle registration: SIM
- Website: www.fronhofen.net

Fronhofen is an Ortsgemeinde – a municipality belonging to a Verbandsgemeinde, a kind of collective municipality – in the Rhein-Hunsrück-Kreis district in Rhineland-Palatinate, Germany. It is a part of the Verbandsgemeinde Simmern-Rheinböllen, whose seat is in Simmern.

== Geography ==
=== Location ===
The municipality lies in the central Hunsrück in the Biebertal, the valley of the Bieberbach, between Bundesstraße 50 and the Hunsrückhöhenstraße (“Hunsrück Heights Road”, a scenic road across the Hunsrück built originally as a military road on Hermann Göring’s orders). The village itself lies on sloped ground at an elevation of 370 to 408 m above sea level.

== History ==
In 1285, Fronhofen had its first documentary mention; however, its history does reach back somewhat further. Originally, Fronhofen consisted of a monastery estate and a mill. In 1074, Count Berthold donated the holding to Ravengiersburg Monastery, and until 1408 it belonged to the Provostry of Ravengiersburg, and thereafter to the Oberamt of Simmern.

This lordly estate was what was actually mentioned by name in the first documentary mention in 1285. In a dispute between the Provost of Ravengiersburg and the Vögte of Heinzenberg in that year, it was determined that the monastery should own its four lordly estates free of all service. The estate at that time had a manor house, two barns, a stable and a mill. The grounds amounted to 44 Morgen (roughly 14 ha) in cropfields, a great heath field in the Oberbrühl of 12 Morgen (about 3.8 ha) and 11 meadows, along with a forest of 200 Morgen (roughly 64 ha).

Of the tithes gathered at Fronhofen, the priest got one third, while the other two thirds were shared out by the Counts of Sponheim and their heirs to the families von Wildberg, von Koppenstein, Blicker Landschad von Steinach and Schenk von Schmidtburg, as well as to the Barons of Hacke. The Haus Klopp lay south of Fronhofen and was a farm with four households. Fronhofen and Klopp, according to Elector Palatine Phillipp’s Geistliches Lehenbuch (“Clerical Book of Fiefs”), belonged to the ecclesiastical region (Pfarrbezirk) of Neuerkirch-Biebern.

Beginning in 1794, Fronhofen lay under French rule. In 1815 it was assigned to the Kingdom of Prussia at the Congress of Vienna. Since 1946, it has been part of the then newly founded state of Rhineland-Palatinate. Flurbereinigung was undertaken in 1912 and again in 1985.

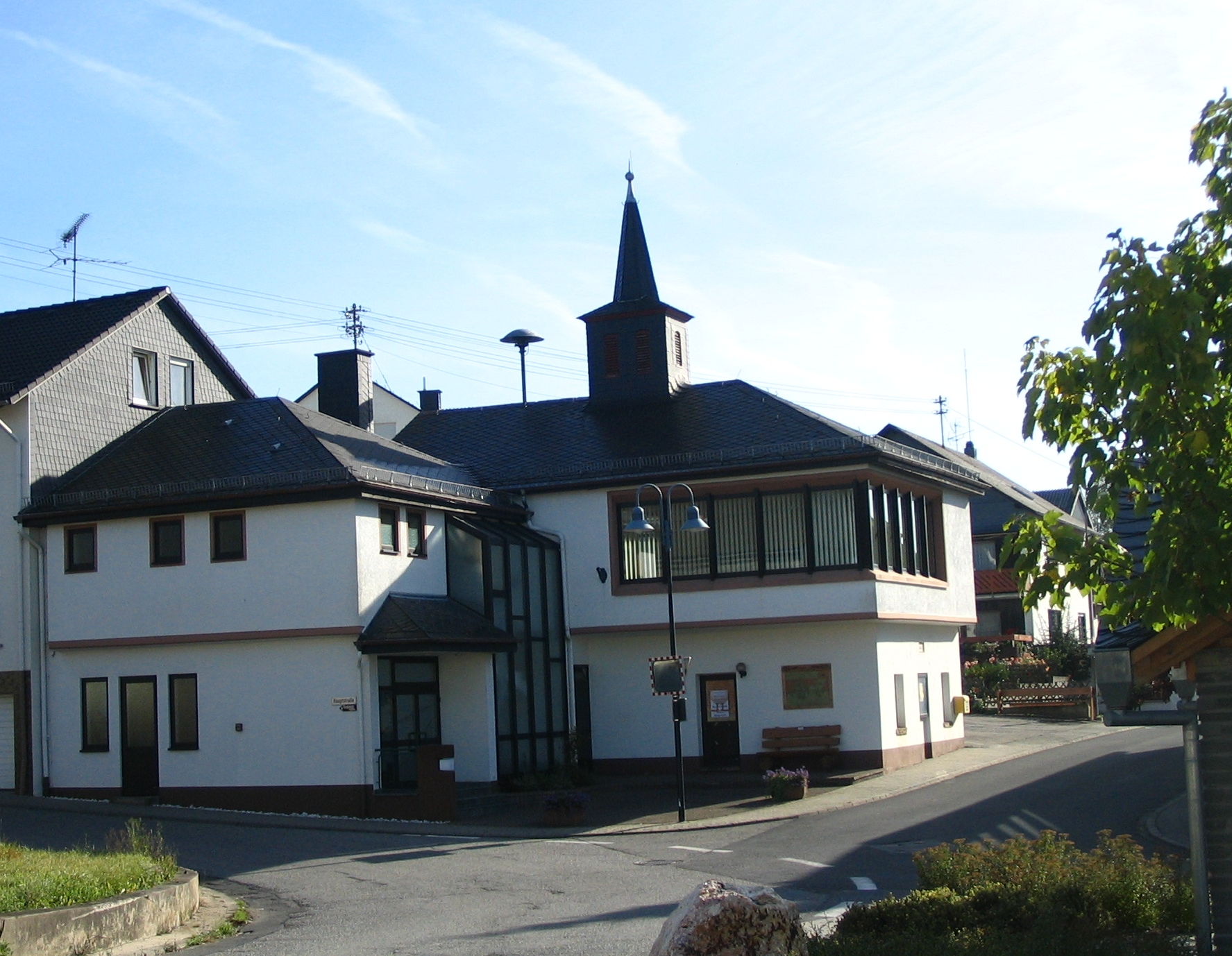
Community centre in the village centre

== Politics ==
=== Municipal council ===
The council is made up of 6 council members, who were elected at the municipal election held on 9 June 2024, and the honorary mayor as chairman.

=== Mayor ===
Fronhofen’s mayor is Michael Gerhardy.

=== Coat of arms ===
The German blazon reads: In Schwarz auf silbernem Dreiberg, darin wachsender blauer Krummstab, ein rotbewehrter und gezungter goldener Löwe nach links.

The municipality’s arms might in English heraldic language be described thus: Sable in base a mount of three argent surmounting which an abbot’s staff sinister issuant from base azure, and upon which a lion rampant sinister queue fourché Or armed and langued gules.

The silver charge in base, the mount of three (called a Dreiberg in German heraldry) and the lion standing thereupon are drawn from the 1773 seal once used by the Schultheißerei. The lion refers to the former landholders, the Counts of Simmern and the Elector of the Palatinate. The abbot’s staff refers to the lordly estate of the Augustinian canons of Ravengiersburg, from which the municipality gets its name, “lordly estate” being Fronhof in German.

The arms have been borne since 15 March 1981, and they were designed by Willi Wagner.
