= Westernach (Mindel) =

River in Germany

Location
- Country: Germany
- State: Bavaria

Physical characteristics
- Mouth
  - location: Mindel
  - coordinates: 48.0847°N 10.4739°E
- Length: 20.0 km (12.4 mi)

Basin features
- Progression: Mindel→ Danube→ Black Sea

Westernach is a river of Bavaria, Germany. It is a tributary of the Mindel near Mindelheim.

== See also ==
- List of rivers of Bavaria
