= Augsburger Verkehrs- und Tarifverbund =

Augsburger Verkehrs- und Tarifverbund (AVV)
- Industry: Public transport
- Founded: 1 July 1985; 40 years ago
- Headquarters: Augsburg, Germany
- Area served: Greater Augsburg

Old logo used from 1985 until 2011.

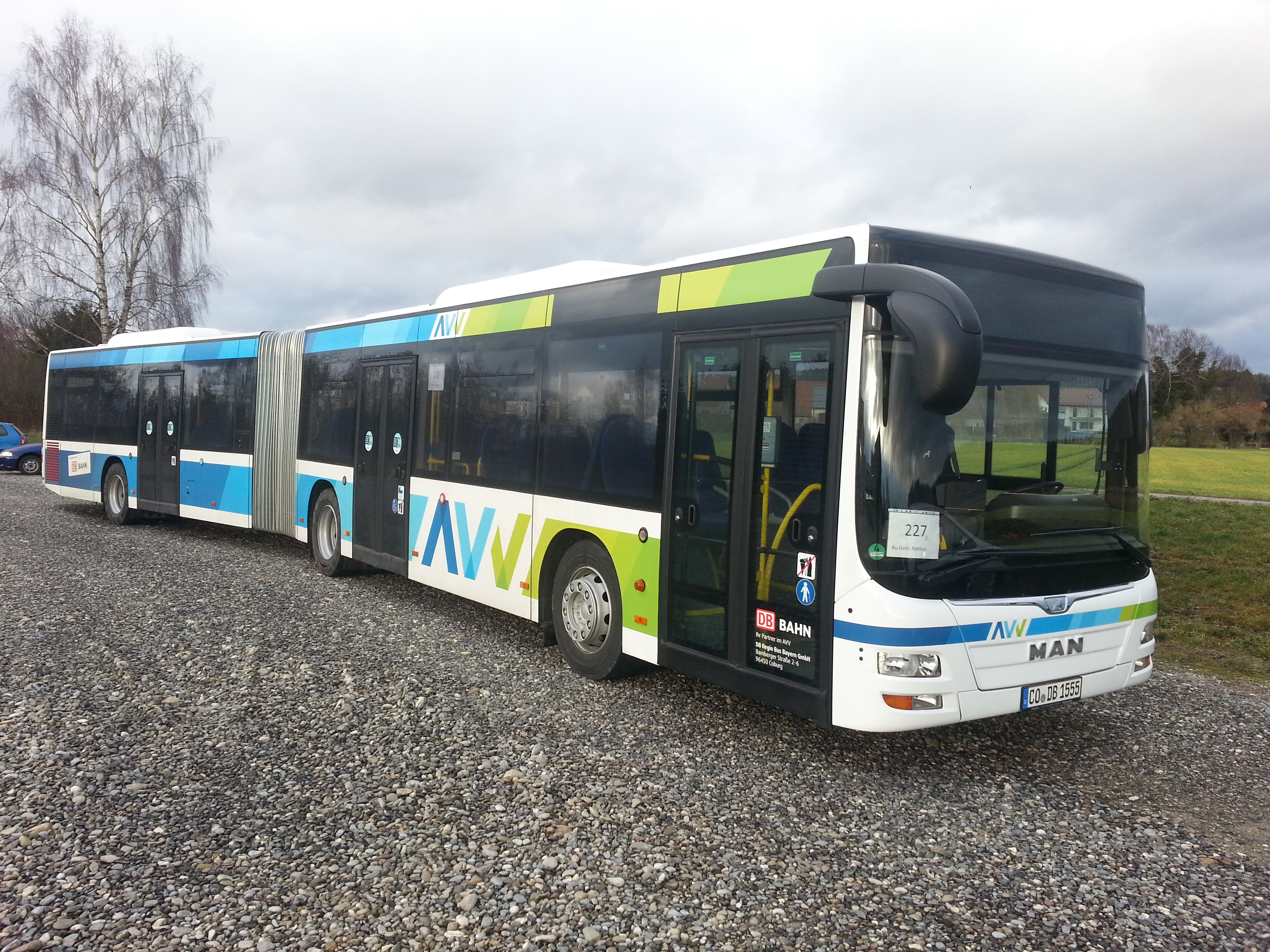
Bus of DB Regio Bus Bayern GmbH (DRB) in the new AVV design.

The Augsburger Verkehrs- und Tarifverbund (German for Augsburg Transport and Tariff Association) or AVV is the transit authority of the city of Augsburg, located in Swabia, Bavaria, Germany. Its jurisdiction covers the city and its surrounding area, responsible for the commuter trains, the Augsburg tramway and buses.

== Coverage ==
The AVV coordinates transport and fares in area comprising the city of Augsburg and three surrounding districts. It is jointly owned by the state of Bavaria, the city of Augsburg and the three surrounding districts, which are:

- Augsburg (city)
- Augsburg (district)
- Aichach-Friedberg (district)
- Dillingen (district)

== History ==
The first plans for a transport association in the Augsburg region had already been drawn up in 1974, but the shareholders' agreement was not signed until 1985 before the Verbundgesellschaft finally commenced operations on 1 July 1985. In July 1985, the Verbundgesellschaft commenced business operations and initially started a test operation with eight sections

1. Aindling and Pöttmes;
2. Mering and Kissing, Bavaria;
3. Eurasburg, Dasing, Friedberg, Bavaria, Aichach and Inchenhofen;
4. Gersthofen, Meitingen, Wertingen, Nordendorf, Donauwörth and Otting-Monheim, Bavaria;
5. Neusäß, Zusmarshausen, Welden and Altenmünster;
6. Langenneufnach, Gessertshausen, Dinkelscherben and Stadtbergen;
7. Klosterlechfeld, Schwabmünchen and Bobingen;
8. Königsbrunn).

The AVV initially replaced the community tariff of the Verkehrsgemeinschaft Augsburg (VGA) before it was completely dissolved in 1995. In later years, the area was successively extended, first from 24 September 1989 by the district of Aichach-Friedberg, then from 2 June 1991 by the Welden / Aystetten / Zusmarshausen area including local rail passenger transport to Donauwörth and from 27 September 1992 by the Diedorf / Gessertshausen / Dinkelscherben area. Around the mid-1990s, changes were made to the tariff zones. For example, the bus stop "Wertachbrücke" used to belong to zone 20, whereas today it belongs to zone 10. The city of Friedberg used to be a further tariff zone between today's zones 31 and 32. In the course of the new division, Friedberg now belonged to zone 20 and has since been the valid zone border for tariff zones 31 and 32. In addition, the AVV tariff on the Augsburg–Nördlingen railway and the Donauwörth–Treuchtlingen railway has applied since 1 August 2006 to Otting-Weilheim station in the district of Donau-Ries.
