= Meitingen =

- Municipality
- Church of Saint Wolfgang

- Coat of arms

- Location of Meitingen within Augsburg district
- Interactive map of Meitingen
- Location within Germany Location within Bavaria
- Coordinates: 48°32′N 10°50′E
- Country: Germany
- State: Bavaria
- Admin. region: Schwaben
- District: Augsburg

Government
  - Mayor (2020–26): Michael Higl (CSU)

Area
  - Total: 29.87 km^{2} (11.53 sq mi)
- Elevation: 433 m (1,421 ft)

Population (2025-12-31)
  - Total: 12,328
  - Density: 412.7/km^{2} (1,069/sq mi)
- Time zone: UTC+01:00 (CET)
  - Summer (DST): UTC+02:00 (CEST)
- Postal codes: 86405
- Dialling codes: 08271
- Vehicle registration: A
- Website: https://www.meitingen.de/

Meitingen (German pronunciation: [ˈmaɪtɪŋən]) is a market town in the district of Augsburg, in Bavaria, Germany. It is situated on the left bank of the Lech, 20 km (12 mi) south of Donauwörth, and 21 km (13 mi) north of Augsburg.

== History ==
Meitingen was firstly mentioned in a certificate in 1231. Since the German Mediatisation Meitingen belongs to Bavaria in 1803. In 1844 the railroad line Augsburg-Nürnberg arrived Meitingen. The construction of the Lech-channel determined series of flooding caused by the river Lech.

With the construction of the hydro-electric power plant of the Lech-channel the industrialization of Meitingen started. Until 1972 Meitingen was a part of the district of Wertingen but because of local government reforms Erlingen, Herbertshofen, Ostendorf, Langenreichen and Waltershofen became a part of Meitingen. In succession of the growth and the importance for the environs Meitingen became a market town in 1989.

== Notable people ==
In 1928, Max Josef Metzger, a Roman Catholic priest, founded the Christkönigshaus ("House of Christ the King"). Because of his dedication in the international peace movement, Metzger, who last worked in Berlin, was a thorn in the flesh of the National Socialists. In 1944, after denunciation, he was arrested, convicted and executed in Brandenburg-Görden_Prison. His relics rest at the local graveyard. His gravestone, a memorial tablet at the Christkönigshaus, the name of a street and of the secondary school remember his dedication.

== Districts ==
- Meitingen, main location
- Herbertshofen, village
- Erlingen, village
- Ostendorf, village
- Waltershofen, village
- Langenreichen, village

=== Neighbor communities ===
- Biberbach (District of Augsburg)
- Ellgau (District of Augsburg)
- Kühlenthal (District of Augsburg)
- Westendorf (District of Augsburg)
- Langweid am Lech (District of Augsburg)
- Thierhaupten (District of Augsburg)
- Wertingen (District of Dillingen)

== Politics ==
There are 24 seats in the town council:

- Christian-Social Union of Bavaria (CSU): 9 seats
- Social Democratic Party of Germany (SPD): 3 seats
- Freie Lechtaler Wählergemeinschaft (FLW): 4 seats
- Freie Wähler Gruppe Meitingen (FWG): 2 seats
- Unpolitische Wahl-Gemeinschaft (UWG): 3 seats
- Junge Bürger Union (JBU): 2 seats
- Freie Wählergemeinschaft (FWGem): 1 seat

=== Coat of arms ===
The emblem shows a silver bear with a golden necklace and a silver river on a red background. The emblem was extracted from the heraldic figure of the old nobility of Meitingen. Instead of a black bear on a golden background, the colours white and black were chosen to show the former belonging to Burgau. In the emblem of Burgau the colours red and white are dominating.

=== Sister city ===
Meitingen's sister city is Pouzauges, Vendée, France. Through an exchange program, every year pupils from France visit the secondary school of Meitingen.

== Economy and infrastructure ==
Meitingen station

The SGL Carbon Company has an office in Meitingen. This company produces ceramic brake disks and graphite electrodes. The SGL Carbon Company is listed in the MDAX.

=== Traffic ===
Through Meitingen goes the federal highway 2, B2, between Augsburg and Donauwörth. There is a railroad connection between Augsburg and Donauwörth which passes through Meitingen.

=== Education ===
In Meitingen there are the following schools:

- Elementary school
- Primary school
- Secondary school (Dr.Max-Josef-Metzger Schule)

== Sports ==
Meitingen has a sports club, the TSV Meitingen. This club includes different types of sport.
