= Thomas Geyer =

German footballer

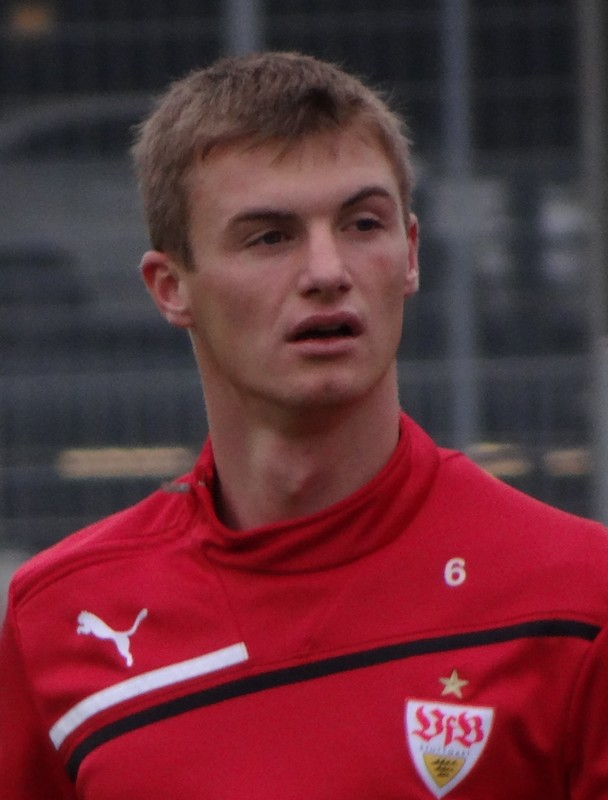
- Geyer training with VfB Stuttgart

Personal information
- Date of birth: 6 March 1991 (age 35)
- Place of birth: Ehingen, Swabia, Germany
- Height: 1.79 m (5 ft 10 in)
- Position: Centre-back

Team information
- Current team: VfR Aalen
- Number: 16

Youth career
- 1995–1999: SG Dettingen
- 1999–2001: SSV Ulm
- 2007–2010: VfB Stuttgart

Senior career*
Years	Team	Apps	(Gls)
2010–2014	VfB Stuttgart II	127	(1)
2014–2016	SV Wehen Wiesbaden	68	(0)
2016–2019	VfR Aalen	111	(2)
2019–2025	SSV Ulm	158	(1)
2025–	VfR Aalen	41	(1)
- * Club domestic league appearances and goals as of 24 September 2026

Thomas Geyer (born 6 March 1991) is a German footballer who plays as a centre-back for Oberliga Baden-Württemberg club VfR Aalen.
