= Erlingen =

- Ortsteil of Meitingen
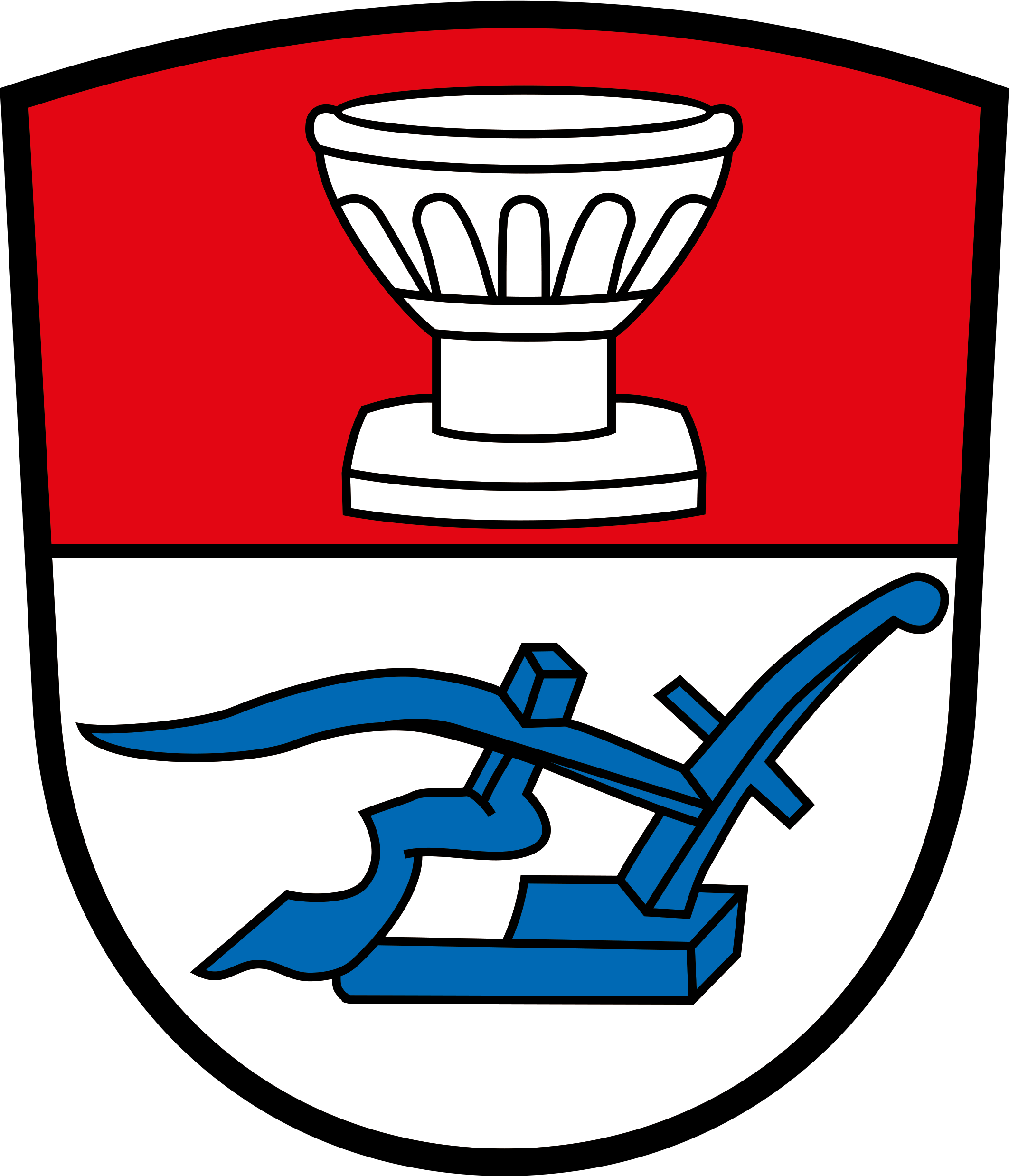
- Coat of arms
- Interactive map of Erlingen
- Location within Germany Location within Bavaria
- Coordinates: 48°31′47″N 10°50′25″E
- Country: Germany
- State: Bavaria
- Admin. region: Schwaben
- District: Augsburg
- Municipality: Meitingen
- Elevation: 434 m (1,424 ft)

Population
  - Total: 1,400
- Time zone: UTC+01:00 (CET)
  - Summer (DST): UTC+02:00 (CEST)
- Postal codes: 86405
- Dialling codes: 08271
- Vehicle registration: A

Erlingen is a small village and also an Ortsteil of the municipality Meitingen. The village belongs to the administrative district Augsburg in Bavaria, southern Germany. It is located between the cities Augsburg and Donauwörth. Until 1972, when the village was integrated into the municipality Meitingen, Erlingen was an independent municipality. Today the population in Erlingen is about 1,700 people. Erlingen belongs to the Roman Catholic parish of Saint Clemens in Herbertshofen.
