= Auerbach =

Auerbach or Auer Bach, German for "meadow-brook", may refer to the following:

== Places ==
=== In Austria ===
- Auerbach, Upper Austria, Braunau am Inn district

=== In Germany ===
==== Localities ====
- Auerbach (Albtal), a village of Karlsbad, administrative area in Baden-Württemberg
- Auerbach (Elztal), a district of Elztal, a municipality in Baden-Württemberg
- Auerbach, Erzgebirgskreis, a municipality in Saxony
- Auerbach (Horgau), a village of Horgau, in Bavaria
- Auerbach in der Oberpfalz, a town in the Amberg-Sulzbach district, Bavaria
- Auerbach, Lower Bavaria, a municipality in the Deggendorf district, Bavaria
- Auerbach (Vogtland), a town in Saxony

==== Rivers ====
- Auerbach (Günz), tributary of the Günz, Bavaria
- Auerbach (Kinzig), tributary of the Kinzig, Hesse
- Auer Bach, a river of North Rhine-Westphalia

==== Landmarks ====
- Auerbach Castle, in Bensheim, Hesse
- Auerbachs Keller, a historic restaurant in Leipzig, made famous by Goethe's Faust I

== People ==
- Auerbach (surname), a German surname, including a list of people with that surname
- Auerbach (Jewish family), a family of scholars of the 16th to 19th century

== Other uses ==
- Auerbach's plexus, a plexus of sympathetic nerve fibers
- VfB Auerbach, German football club
- Auerbach Publishing
- Auerbach basis, in functional analysis
