= Aurbach =

Aurbach is a surname. Notable people with the surname include:

- Arnold Aurbach (1888–1952), Polish-French chess player
- Gerald D. Aurbach (1927–1991), American medical scientist
- Doron Aurbach (born 1952), Israeli electrochemist, materials and surface scientist

== See also ==
- Auerbach (disambiguation)
