= Johannimarkt (Kloster Holzen) =

Folk festival in Germany

Johannimarkt in Holzen Abbey is a traditional funfair held in Allmannshofen in Swabian district of Augsburg in Bavaria, (Germany) It is a 2-day folk festival during the month of June on the weekend of Johanni around the Holzen Abbey (German: Kloster Holzen). Holzen Abbey is a former abbey of Benedictine order in Allmannshofen in Augsburg Diocese.

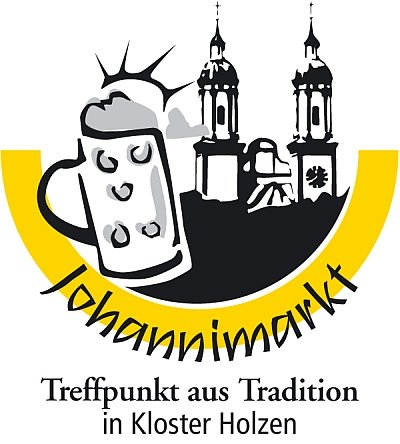
Johannimarkt in Kloster Holzen

== Fairground ==
The funfair is located on Holzens Abbey Hill.

== Amenities ==
=== Products ===
With approximately 130 vendors, the funfair offers a wide choice of booths selling the latest fashionable items, such as toys, household goods and handicrafts. It features an amusement park with a gun range, a swingboat, carousels and a trampoline, as well as Bavarian beer tents and beer gardens.

=== Carneys ===
Presented carneys on funfair normally came from the Swabian environs or were represented by local associations or other individuals. Ceramics for houses and are sold by handicapped people.

=== Background music ===
Johannimarkt is accompanied by music for brass instruments. The musicians arrive from the vicinity, for example the Ehinger Musikanten (English: Ehingen musicians)or the brass-orchestraoder for youth from Ellgau Viva La Musica.

== Organizer ==
Johannimarkt is organised in the municipality of Allmannshofen and its local associations, like Freiwilligen Feuerwehr Allmannshofen (English: Auxiliary fire brigade of Allmannshofen) or Schützenverein Gemütlichkeit Allmannshofen (English: gun club Allmannshofen).

Kloster Holzen
