= AVV (disambiguation) =

AVV is the IATA code for Avalon Airport.

AVV may also refer to:

- avv, the ISO 639-code for Avá-Canoeiro language
- Augsburger Verkehrs- und Tarifverbund, the transit authority of the city of Augsburg
- Annemiek van Vleuten, a Dutch professional road racing cyclist
