= Thierhaupten =

- Municipality
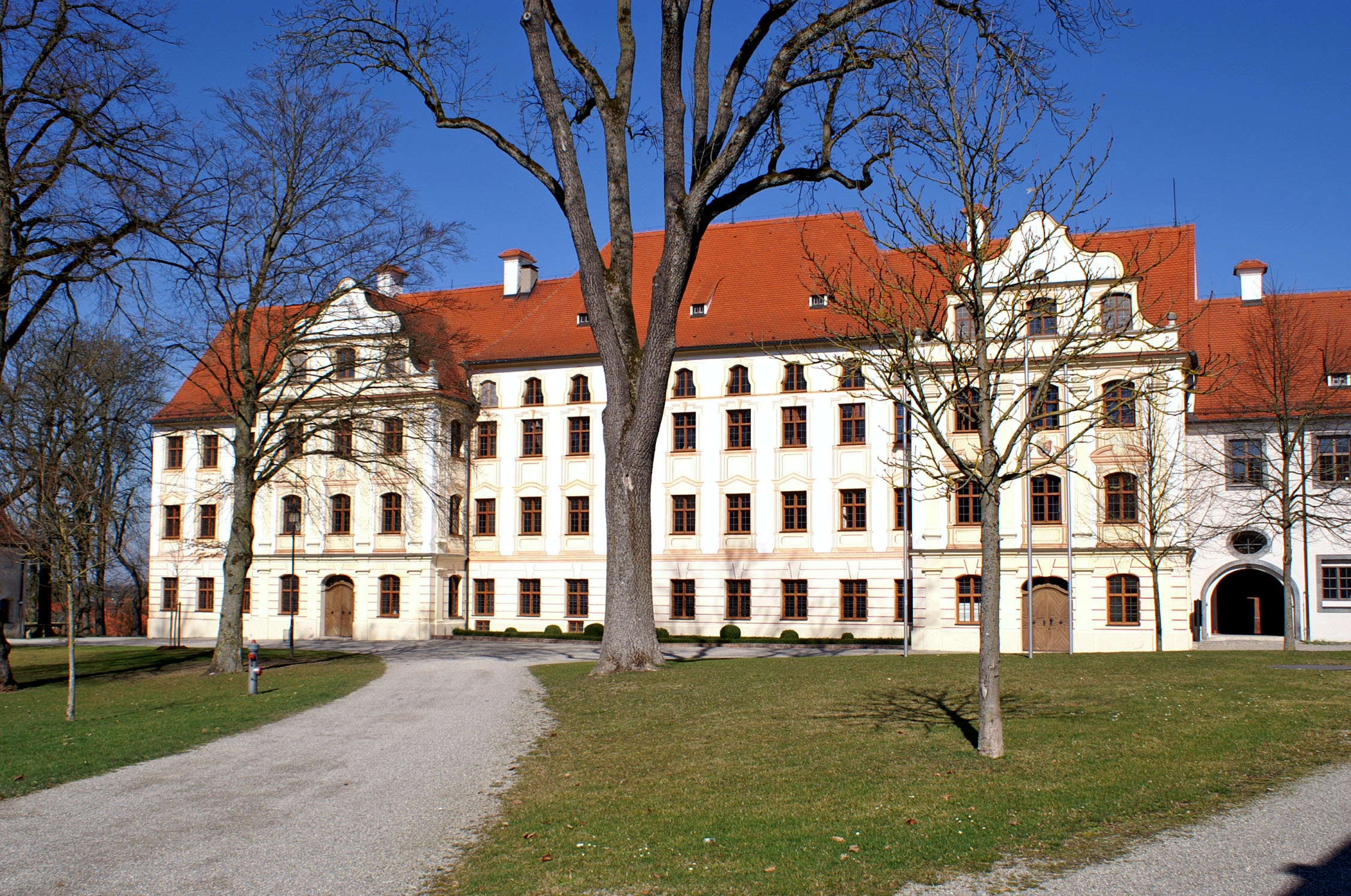
- Thierhaupten Abbey

- Coat of arms

- Location of Thierhaupten within Augsburg district
- Interactive map of Thierhaupten
- Location within Germany Location within Bavaria
- Coordinates: 48°34′N 10°55′E
- Country: Germany
- State: Bavaria
- Admin. region: Schwaben
- District: Augsburg

Government
  - Mayor (2020–26): Anton Brugger (CSU)

Area
  - Total: 39.19 km^{2} (15.13 sq mi)
- Elevation: 430 m (1,410 ft)

Population (2025-12-31)
  - Total: 4,086
  - Density: 104.3/km^{2} (270.0/sq mi)
- Time zone: UTC+01:00 (CET)
  - Summer (DST): UTC+02:00 (CEST)
- Postal codes: 86672
- Dialling codes: 08271
- Vehicle registration: A
- Website: www.thierhaupten.de

Thierhaupten (German pronunciation: [tiːɐ̯ˈhaʊptn̩]) is a market town in south-central Germany in the district of Augsburg (district) in the Swabia administrative region of Bavaria, and is located at the Lech Valley.

== Districts ==
There are 8 town districts (Ortsteile) in Thierhaupten:

- Altenbach
- Hölzlarn
- Königsbrunn
- Neukirchen
- Ötz
- Sparmannseck
- Thierhaupten
- Weiden

== Geography ==
Thierhaupten is located on the eastern margin of the Lech (river) Valley in the middle between Augsburg and Donauwörth. The "lower village" is located in the Lech Valley, so as the villages Ötz and Altenbach. The "upper village" of Thierhaupten and the villages Neukirchen, Weiden, Hölzlarn, Sparmannseck are located in the Old Bavarian Tertiary Hills.

The Lech is the western frontier of the town district of Thierhaupten, but it does not touch the town itself. The Friedberger Ach creek goes through Thierhaupten from south to north.

The Kühberg (499 m NN) ("cow hill") in the village district of Neukirchen is the highest elevation of Thierhaupten. The Kreuzberg (479 m NN) ("cross hill") dominates the Thierhaupten town itself.

=== Neighbour municipalities ===
- Aindling (district of Aichach-Friedberg)
- Baar, Swabia (district of Aichach-Friedberg)
- Ellgau (Augsburg (district))
- Meitingen (Augsburg (district))
- Münster, Bavaria (district of Donau-Ries)
- Pöttmes (district of Aichach-Friedberg
- Todtenweis (district of Aichach-Friedberg)

== History ==
The name "Thierhaupten" is of Germanic origin: there must have been a Germanic settlement, where animal heads were exposed (Tierhaupt = animal head). In the year of 1776 a sandy stone animal head was dug out. This could be a further indication in favour of this theory.

After a legend, in the year 750 Tassilo III, Duke of Bavaria (Agilolfings dynasty) lost his way in the woods around Thierhaupten and swore to God to build a monastery (Thierhaupten Abbey) at the place of his rescue. Suddenly a hind appeared and showed him his way back (German hunter's jargon: Tier = hind). Still today a hind is on the Thierhaupten coat of arms.

Thierhaupten Abbey was one of the eldest monasteries in Bavaria. The abbey was looted by the Hungarians in 955. It was destroyed by the Swabian League in 1504 but re-built, although it was always a small municipality. Finally it was dissolved in 1803 in the secularisation of Bavaria.

The buildings were sold off to a local businessman. The last abbot, Edmund Schmid, remained in Thierhaupten as the parish priest, and succeeded in 1812 in acquiring the former abbey church for use as the parish church. The remaining buildings gradually fell into disrepair, but were bought by the Thierhaupten market town administration in 1983 and renovated.
