= Wehringen =

- Municipality
- Coat of arms

- Location of Wehringen within Augsburg district
- Interactive map of Wehringen
- Location within Germany Location within Bavaria
- Coordinates: 48°15′N 10°48′E
- Country: Germany
- State: Bavaria
- Admin. region: Schwaben
- District: Augsburg

Government
  - Mayor (2020–26): Manfred Nerlinger (CSU)

Area
  - Total: 14.11 km^{2} (5.45 sq mi)
- Elevation: 532 m (1,745 ft)

Population (2025-12-31)
  - Total: 3,171
  - Density: 224.7/km^{2} (582.1/sq mi)
- Time zone: UTC+01:00 (CET)
  - Summer (DST): UTC+02:00 (CEST)
- Postal codes: 86517
- Dialling codes: 08234
- Vehicle registration: A
- Website: www.wehringen.de

Wehringen (German pronunciation: [ˈveːʁɪŋən]) is a municipality in the district of Augsburg in Bavaria in Germany it is located 15 km (9.3 mi) south of Augsburg.

== Mayors ==
- Franz Öschay: 1945–1948
- Georg Rott: 1948–1967
- Franz Geirhos (CSU-FWV): 1967–1978
- Johann Merk (CSU): 1978–2008
- Manfred Nerlinger (CSU): since 2008
