= Martin Sailer =

German politician (born 1970)

Member of the Landtag of Bavaria
- In office 6 October 2003 – 30 March 2008
- Succeeded by: Lydia Pflanz
- Constituency: Swabia

Personal details
- Born: 22 April 1970 (age 55) Munich
- Party: Christian Social Union (since 1987)

Martin Sailer (born 22 April 1970 in Munich) is a German politician. He has served as Landrat of Augsburg since 2008, and as chairman of the regional council of Swabia since 2018. From 2003 to 2008, he was a member of the Landtag of Bavaria.
