= Gessertshausen (Verwaltungsgemeinschaft) =

- Verwaltungsgemeinschaft
- Location of Gessertshausen within Augsburg district
- Interactive map of Gessertshausen
- Location within Germany Location within Bavaria
- Coordinates: 48°20′N 10°44′E
- Country: Germany
- State: Bavaria
- Admin. region: Swabia
- District: Augsburg
- Seat: Gessertshausen
- Subdivisions: 2 municipalities

Area
  - Total: 53.61 km^{2} (20.70 sq mi)

Population (2025-12-31)
  - Total: 5,585
  - Density: 104.2/km^{2} (269.8/sq mi)
- Time zone: UTC+01:00 (CET)
  - Summer (DST): UTC+02:00 (CEST)
- Website: www.gessertshausen.de

Gessertshausen is a Verwaltungsgemeinschaft (municipal association) in the district of Augsburg in Bavaria, Germany. Its seat is in Gessertshausen.

It consists of the following municipalities:

1. Gessertshausen
2. Ustersbach
