= Untermeitingen =

- Municipality
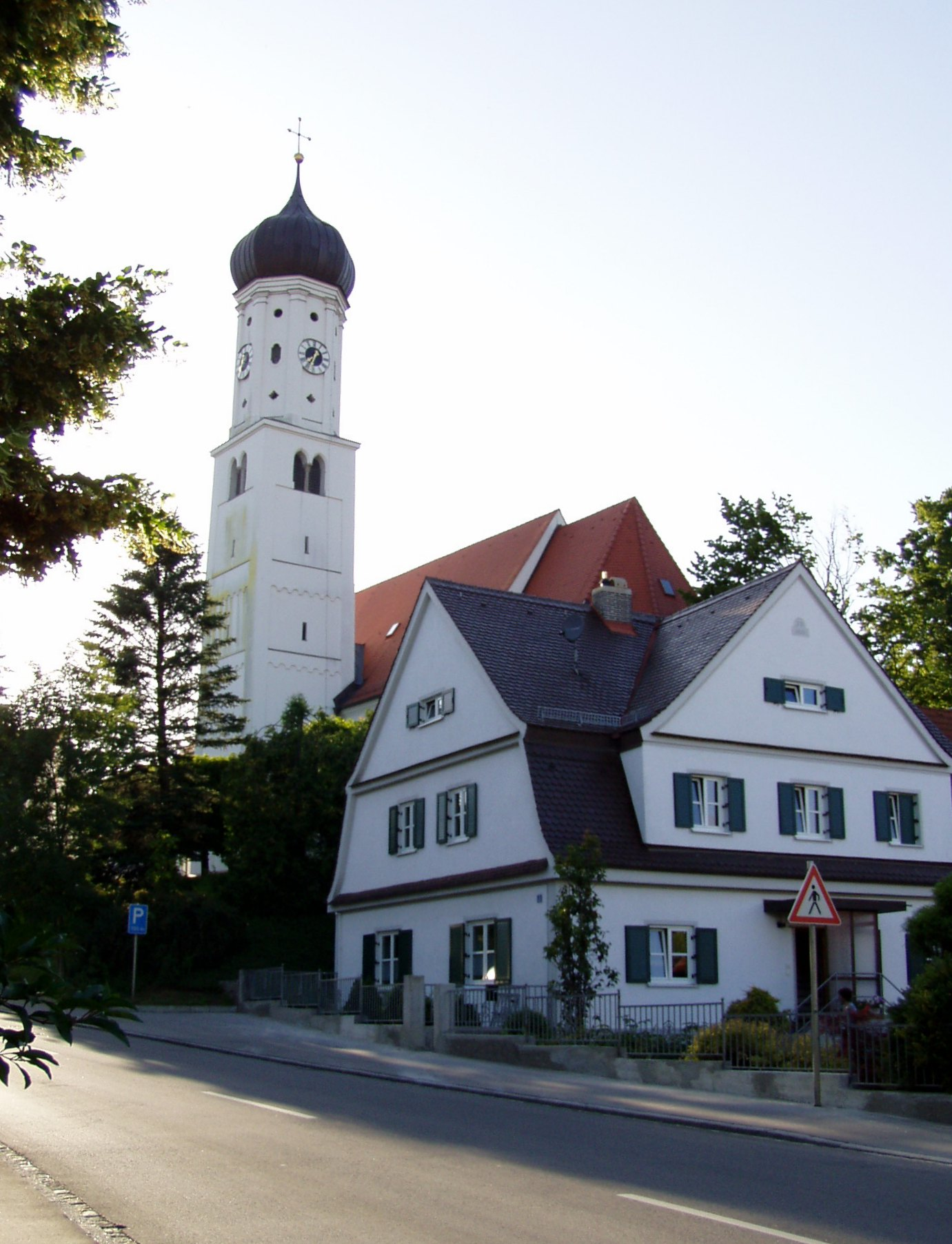
- Church of Saint Stephen

- Coat of arms

- Location of Untermeitingen within Augsburg district
- Interactive map of Untermeitingen
- Location within Germany Location within Bavaria
- Coordinates: 48°10′N 10°48′E
- Country: Germany
- State: Bavaria
- Admin. region: Schwaben
- District: Augsburg
- Municipal assoc.: Lechfeld

Government
  - Mayor (2020–26): Simon Schropp (CSU)

Area
  - Total: 15.58 km^{2} (6.02 sq mi)
- Elevation: 550–575 m (1,804–1,886 ft)

Population (2025-12-31)
  - Total: 7,785
  - Density: 499.7/km^{2} (1,294/sq mi)
- Time zone: UTC+01:00 (CET)
  - Summer (DST): UTC+02:00 (CEST)
- Postal codes: 86836
- Dialling codes: 08232
- Vehicle registration: A

Untermeitingen is a municipality in the district of Augsburg in Bavaria in Germany.

== Geography ==
Untermeitingen is found in the district of Augsburg Untermeitingen which is located in the Lechfeld plain on the left bank of the Lech, 27 km south of Augsburg. The town, located on the border with the district of Landsberg am Lech, forms the administrative area of Lechfeld with the area Klosterlechfeld. Two municipalities together contained 8,795 inhabitants in 2006 over an area of 18 38 km ².

Surrounding communities (starting from the north and in the direction of clockwise): Graben, Scheuring, Obermeitingen, Langerringen and Schwabmünchen.

== History ==
From the tenth century, the village belonged to the bishopric of Augsburg. In 1803, Untermeitingen became part of the new Kingdom of Bavaria. In 1818, it was built as a town and became part of the borough of Schwabmünchen until the latter's death in 1972.

The neighborhood of Lagerlechfeld exists since the nineteenth century as a large military establishment. By 1870, it housed a prison camp, then various railway buildings were built, plus a military hospital in 1899. In 1934, an air base was installed. During the Second World War it served as a base for tests for Messerschmitt Augsburg factories. The base was bombed in 1945. Since 1956, this is a facility of the Bundeswehr.

== Mayors ==
- Since 2014: Simon Schropp
- 1978-2014: Georg Klaußner (CSU)
