= Hiltenfingen =

- Municipality
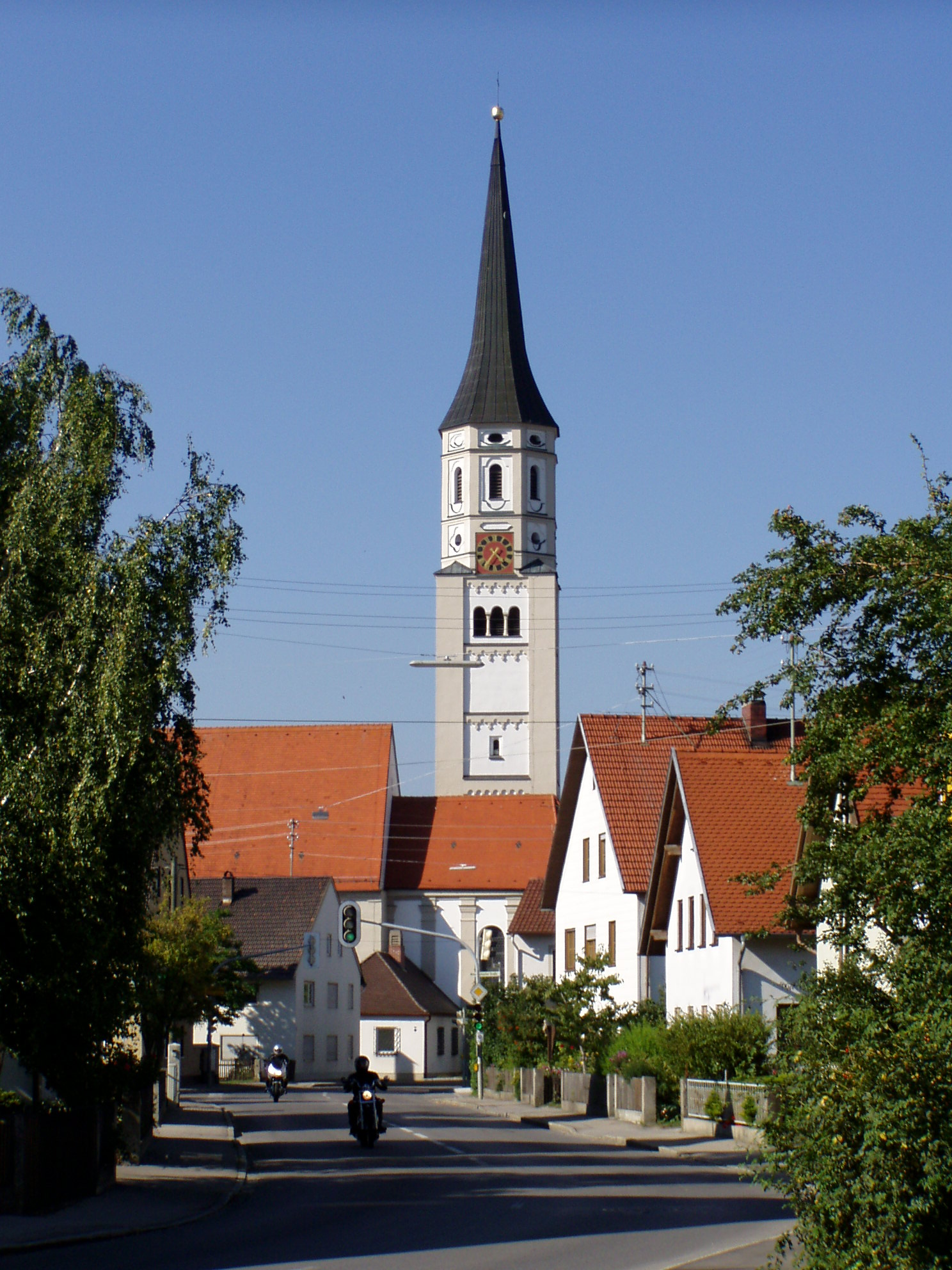
- Center of the village with the Church of Saint Silvester

- Coat of arms

- Location of Hiltenfingen within Augsburg district
- Interactive map of Hiltenfingen
- Location within Germany Location within Bavaria
- Coordinates: 48°10′N 10°42′E
- Country: Germany
- State: Bavaria
- Admin. region: Schwaben
- District: Augsburg
- Municipal assoc.: Langerringen

Government
  - Mayor (2020–26): Robert Irmler

Area
  - Total: 14.55 km^{2} (5.62 sq mi)
- Elevation: 556 m (1,824 ft)

Population (2025-12-31)
  - Total: 1,666
  - Density: 114.5/km^{2} (296.6/sq mi)
- Time zone: UTC+01:00 (CET)
  - Summer (DST): UTC+02:00 (CEST)
- Postal codes: 86856
- Dialling codes: 08232
- Vehicle registration: A
- Website: www.hiltenfingen.de

Hiltenfingen is a municipality in the district of Augsburg in Bavaria in Germany. It is part of the administrative region of Swabia and of the Verwaltungsgemeinschaft of Langerringen.

It is located on the river Wertach, about 30 km south of Augsburg and one kilometer southwest of Schwabmünchen.
