= Großaitingen (Verwaltungsgemeinschaft) =

- Verwaltungsgemeinschaft
- Location of Großaitingen within Augsburg district
- Interactive map of Großaitingen
- Location within Germany Location within Bavaria
- Coordinates: 48°14′N 10°47′E
- Country: Germany
- State: Bavaria
- Admin. region: Swabia
- District: Augsburg
- Seat: Großaitingen
- Subdivisions: 3 municipalities

Area
  - Total: 63.31 km^{2} (24.44 sq mi)

Population (2025-12-31)
  - Total: 8,356
  - Density: 132.0/km^{2} (341.8/sq mi)
- Time zone: UTC+01:00 (CET)
  - Summer (DST): UTC+02:00 (CEST)
- Website: www.grossaitingen.de

Großaitingen is a Verwaltungsgemeinschaft (municipal association) in the district of Augsburg in Bavaria, Germany. Its seat is in Großaitingen.

It consists of the following municipalities:

1. Großaitingen
2. Kleinaitingen
3. Oberottmarshausen
