= Horgau =

- Municipality
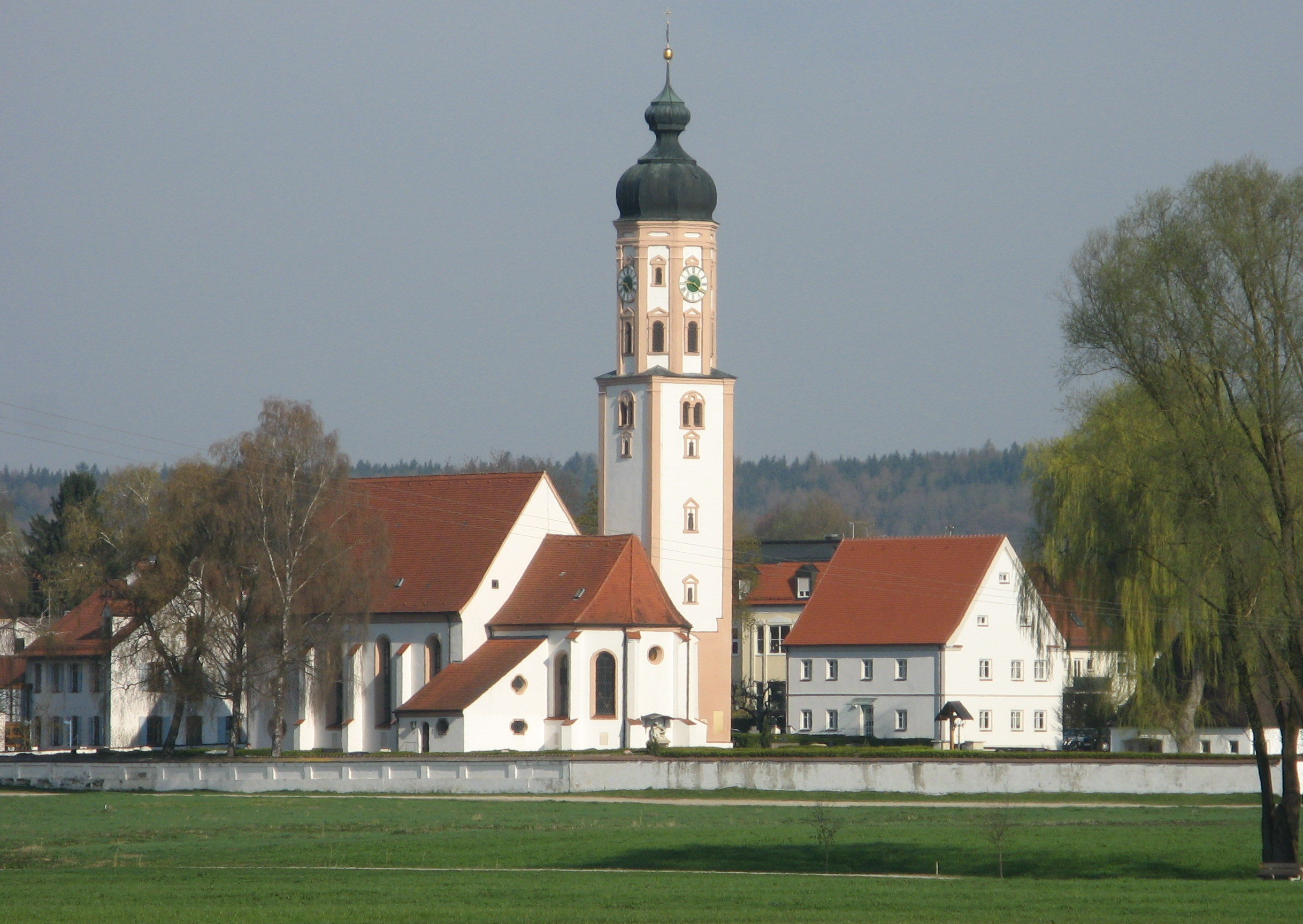
- Church of Saint Martin with the town hall to the right

- Coat of arms

- Location of Horgau within Augsburg district
- Interactive map of Horgau
- Location within Germany Location within Bavaria
- Coordinates: 48°24′N 10°41′E
- Country: Germany
- State: Bavaria
- Admin. region: Schwaben
- District: Augsburg

Government
  - Mayor (2020–26): Thomas Hafner

Area
  - Total: 26.52 km^{2} (10.24 sq mi)
- Elevation: 465 m (1,526 ft)

Population (2025-12-31)
  - Total: 2,935
  - Density: 110.7/km^{2} (286.6/sq mi)
- Time zone: UTC+01:00 (CET)
  - Summer (DST): UTC+02:00 (CEST)
- Postal codes: 86497
- Dialling codes: 08294
- Vehicle registration: A
- Website: www.horgau.de

Horgau is a municipality in the district of Augsburg in Bavaria in Germany.

Districts (villages) of the municipality Horgau: Horgau, Horgauergreut, Auerbach, Bieselbach, Horgau Bahnhof, Lindgraben, Schäfstoß, Herpfenried
