= Ustersbach =

- Municipality
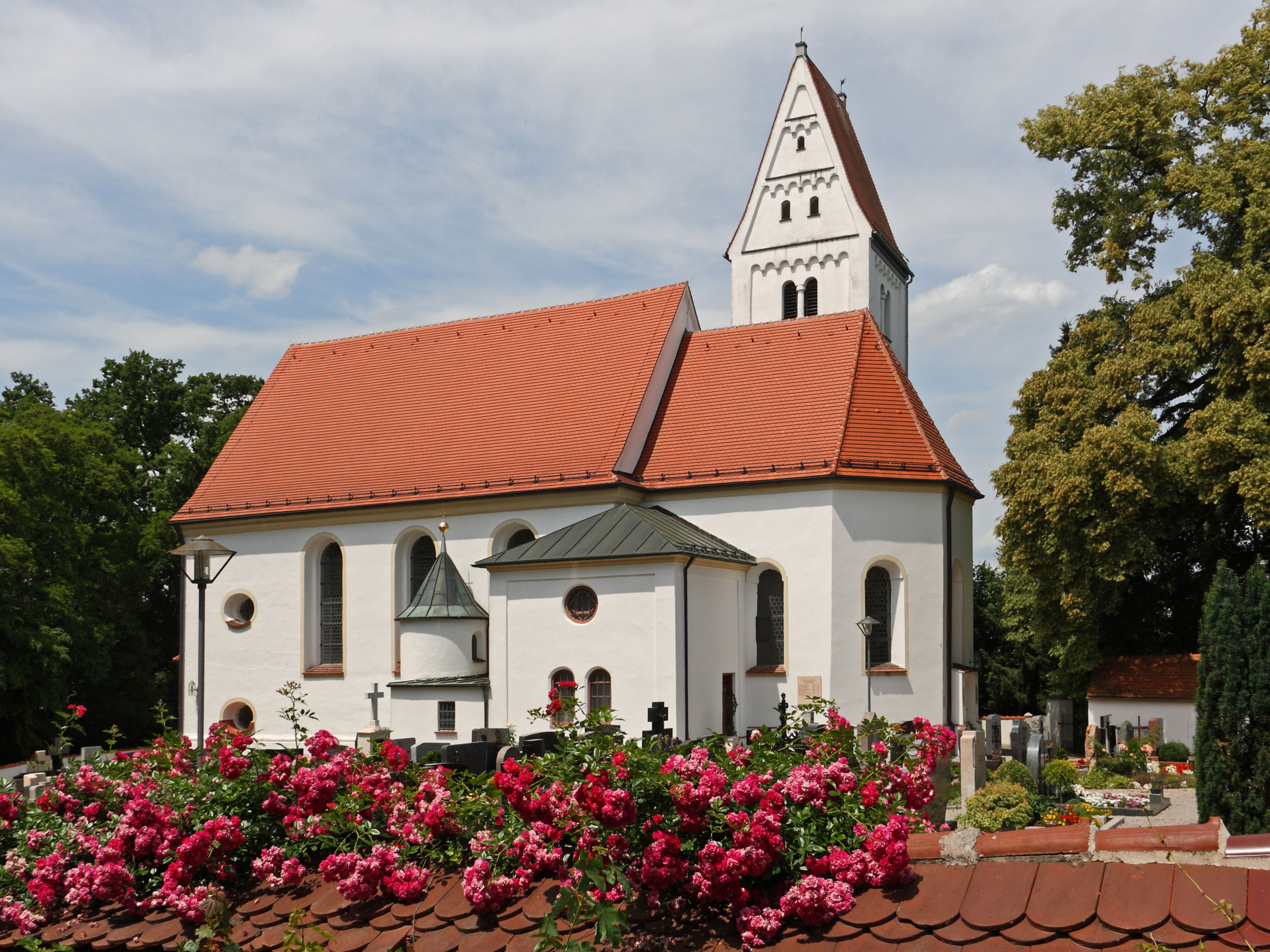
- Church of Saint Fridolin

- Coat of arms

- Location of Ustersbach within Augsburg district
- Interactive map of Ustersbach
- Location within Germany Location within Bavaria
- Coordinates: 48°19′N 10°38′E
- Country: Germany
- State: Bavaria
- Admin. region: Schwaben
- District: Augsburg
- Municipal assoc.: Gessertshausen

Government
  - Mayor (2018–24): Wilhelm Reiter (CSU)

Area
  - Total: 11.14 km^{2} (4.30 sq mi)
- Elevation: 490 m (1,610 ft)

Population (2025-12-31)
  - Total: 1,205
  - Density: 108.2/km^{2} (280.2/sq mi)
- Time zone: UTC+01:00 (CET)
  - Summer (DST): UTC+02:00 (CEST)
- Postal codes: 86514
- Dialling codes: 08236
- Vehicle registration: A
- Website: www.ustersbach.de

Ustersbach is a municipality in the district of Augsburg in Bavaria in Germany. It is situated approx. 20 kilometres (12 mi) west of Augsburg.

== History ==
The village was probably founded in the 11th century and was first mentioned in 1277. It has been part of Bavaria since 1803.

== Main sights ==
The most important monument in Ustersbach is a marble stone dating back to the late Middle Ages commemorating the murder of a knight in 1408.

== Commerce and infrastructure ==
=== Transport ===
Ustersbach is located on the Bundesstraße 300 linking it to Augsburg. The Ulm–Augsburg railway line also crosses the territory of Ustersbach.

=== Economy ===
The main industry of Ustersbach is a brewery producing beer and soft drinks labeled 'Ustersbacher Bier'.

== Politics ==
Distribution of places on the 12-seat municipality-council (as of municipal elections in 2008) is as follows:

- CSU/FW: 8 seats
- Freie Wählergemeinschaft (citizens' coalition): 4 seats

== Notable citizens ==
After the bombing of Munich in World War II the German writer, translator and cultural critic Theodor Haecker fled to Ustersbach. Theodor Haecker had connections with the German resistance, particularly the White Rose. He died in April 1945 and is buried in Ustersbach.

== Culture ==
=== Religion ===
Saint Fridolin of Säckingen is the patron saint of the Roman Catholic parish church of Ustersbach.

=== Sport ===
The local sport club is named TSV Ustersbach. Although its name is referring to sports and gymnastics in general, its most important section is football.
