= Auerbach (Horgau) =

Village in Augsburg, Swabia-Bavaria, Germany

Auerbach
Auerbach (Horgau) is located in Germany
Country:	Germany
State:	Bavaria
Admin.region:	Schwaben
District:	Augsburg
Municipality:	Horgau
Coordinates:	48° 24′ N, 10° 40′ E
Elevation:	465 m (1526 ft)
Population:	500 (2007)
Postal code:	86497 (old: 8901)
Area code:	08294
Licence plate code:	A

Auerbach (German pronunciation: [ˈaʊɐbax]) is a village in the municipality Horgau near Augsburg (13 km) in the district of Augsburg, in Swabia - Bavaria, southern Germany.
