= Allmannshofen =

- Municipality
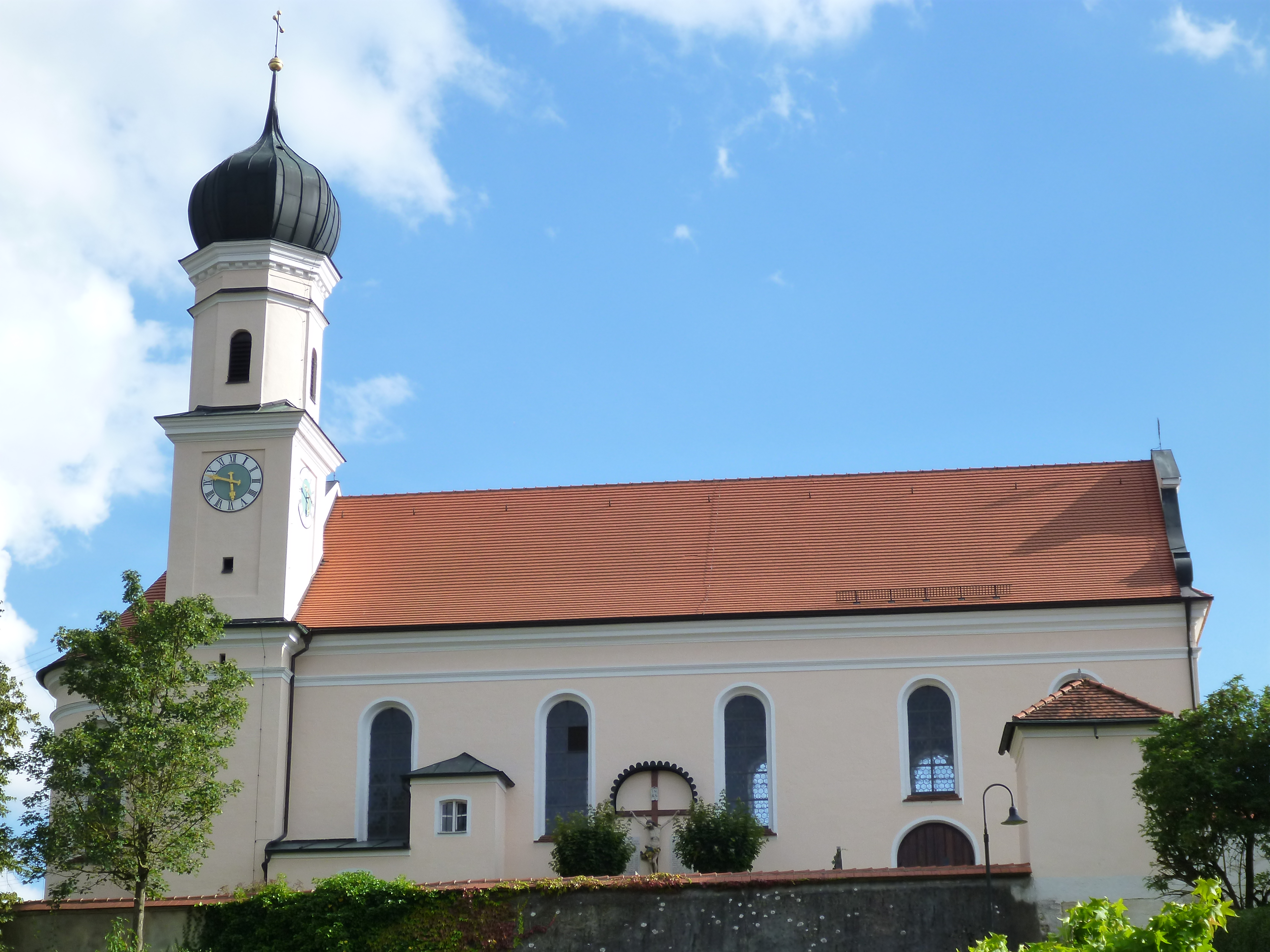
- Church of Saint Nicholas

- Coat of arms

- Location of Allmannshofen within Augsburg district
- Interactive map of Allmannshofen
- Location within Germany Location within Bavaria
- Coordinates: 48°37′N 10°49′E
- Country: Germany
- State: Bavaria
- Admin. region: Schwaben
- District: Augsburg
- Municipal assoc.: Nordendorf

Government
  - Mayor (2020–26): Markus Stettberger

Area
  - Total: 10.31 km^{2} (3.98 sq mi)
- Elevation: 440 m (1,440 ft)

Population (2025-12-31)
  - Total: 976
  - Density: 94.7/km^{2} (245/sq mi)
- Time zone: UTC+01:00 (CET)
  - Summer (DST): UTC+02:00 (CEST)
- Postal codes: 86695
- Dialling codes: 08273
- Vehicle registration: A
- Website: www.allmannshofen.de

Allmannshofen is a municipality in the district of Augsburg, in Bavaria in Germany.

== Events ==
Johannimarkt (Kloster Holzen) is held in June.
