= Langerringen =

- Municipality
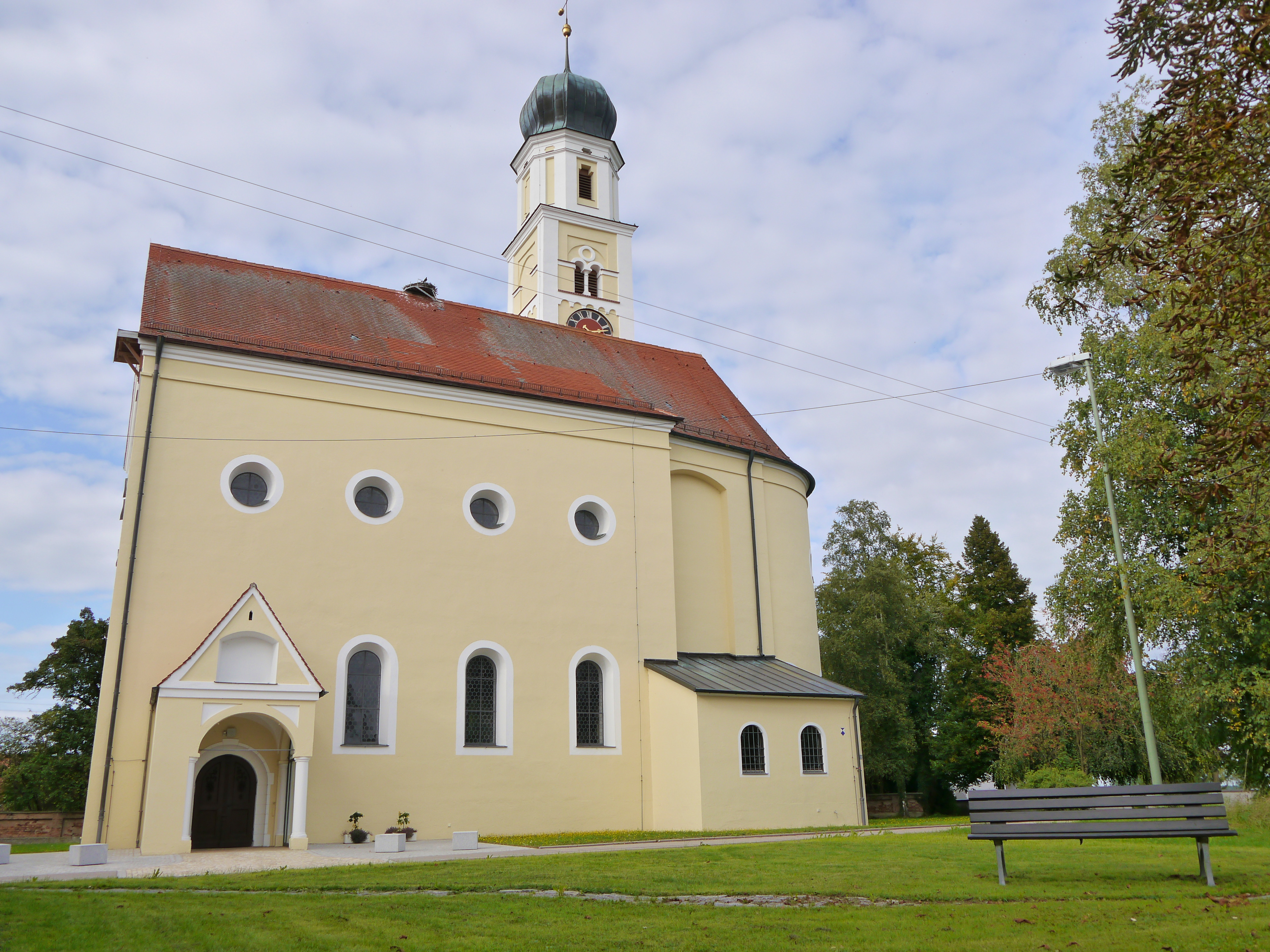
- Church of Saint John the Baptist in Gennach

- Coat of arms

- Location of Langerringen within Augsburg district
- Interactive map of Langerringen
- Location within Germany Location within Bavaria
- Coordinates: 48°9′N 10°46′E
- Country: Germany
- State: Bavaria
- Admin. region: Schwaben
- District: Augsburg
- Municipal assoc.: Langerringen

Government
  - Mayor (2020–26): Marcus Knoll

Area
  - Total: 42.10 km^{2} (16.25 sq mi)
- Elevation: 565–590 m (1,854–1,936 ft)

Population (2025-12-31)
  - Total: 4,185
  - Density: 99.41/km^{2} (257.5/sq mi)
- Time zone: UTC+01:00 (CET)
  - Summer (DST): UTC+02:00 (CEST)
- Postal codes: 86853
- Dialling codes: 08232
- Vehicle registration: A
- Website: www.langerringen.de

Langerringen is a municipality in the district of Augsburg in Bavaria in Germany.
