= Lechfeld (Verwaltungsgemeinschaft) =

- Verwaltungsgemeinschaft
- Location of Lechfeld within Augsburg district
- Interactive map of Lechfeld
- Location within Germany Location within Bavaria
- Coordinates: 48°10′N 10°48′E
- Country: Germany
- State: Bavaria
- Admin. region: Swabia
- District: Augsburg
- Seat: Untermeitingen
- Subdivisions: 2 municipalities

Area
  - Total: 17.38 km^{2} (6.71 sq mi)

Population (2025-12-31)
  - Total: 10,830
  - Density: 623.1/km^{2} (1,614/sq mi)
- Time zone: UTC+01:00 (CET)
  - Summer (DST): UTC+02:00 (CEST)
- Website: lechfeld.de

Lechfeld is a Verwaltungsgemeinschaft (municipal association) in the district of Augsburg in Bavaria, Germany. Its seat is in Untermeitingen. It takes its name from the Lechfeld, the floodplain of the river Lech south of Augsburg.

It consists of the following municipalities:

1. Klosterlechfeld
2. Untermeitingen
