= Thierhaupten Abbey =

Coordinates: 48°33′41″N 10°54′41″E

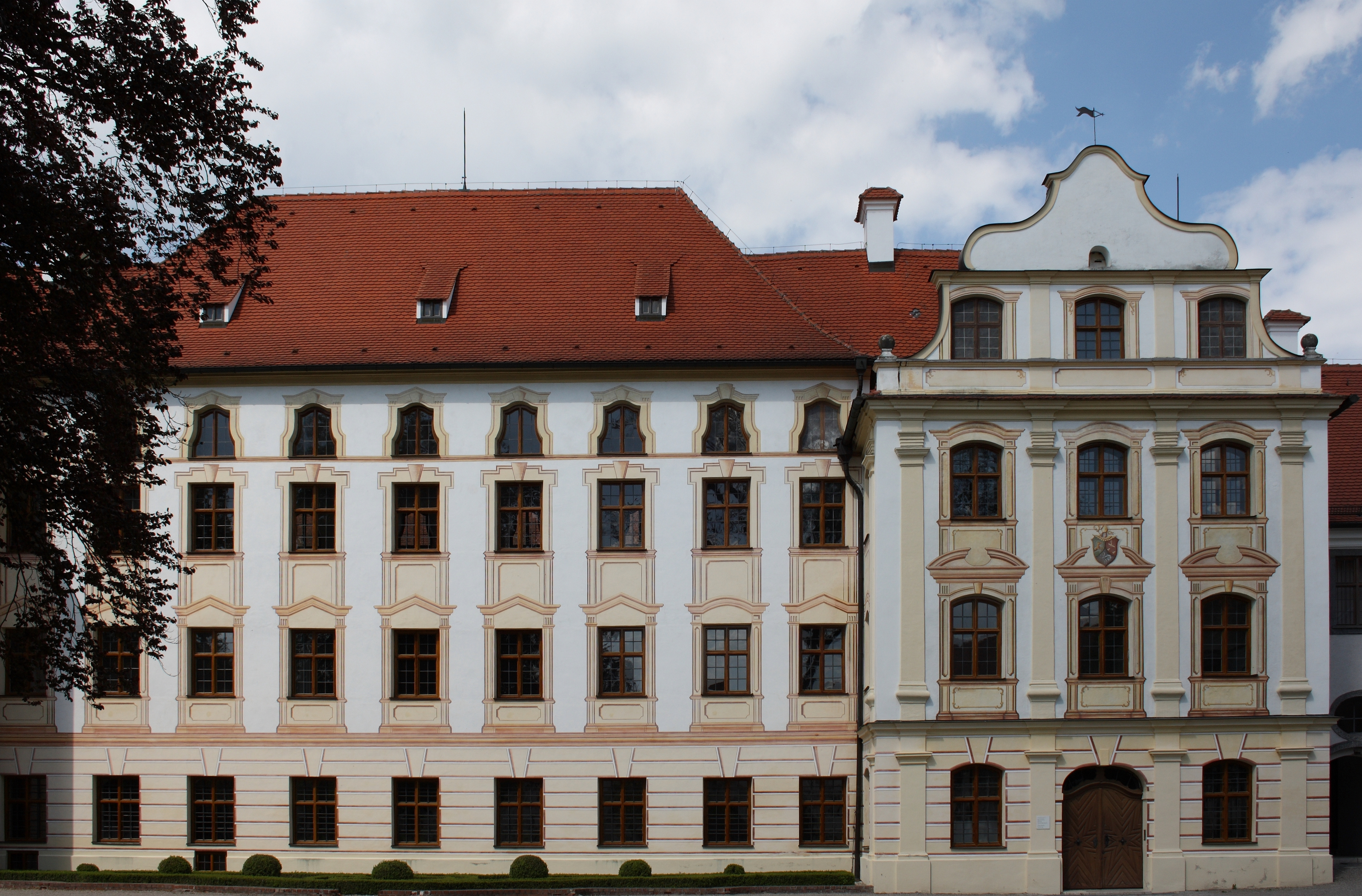
Thierhaupten Abbey

Thierhaupten Abbey (German: Kloster Thierhaupten) was a Benedictine monastery in Thierhaupten near the Lech River and near Augsburg in Bavaria, Germany.

== History ==
The monastery, dedicated to Saints Peter and Paul, was founded in the late 8th century by Duke Tassilo III of Bavaria - the last of the Agilolfings, who was deposed by Charlemagne in 788. Under the Carolingian dynasty, the abbey became a possession of the Augsburg bishops. Its name Thierhaupten, which means "beasts' heads" in German, is supposed to refer to a heathen shrine formerly on the site, possibly the remnants of a pagan cult place.

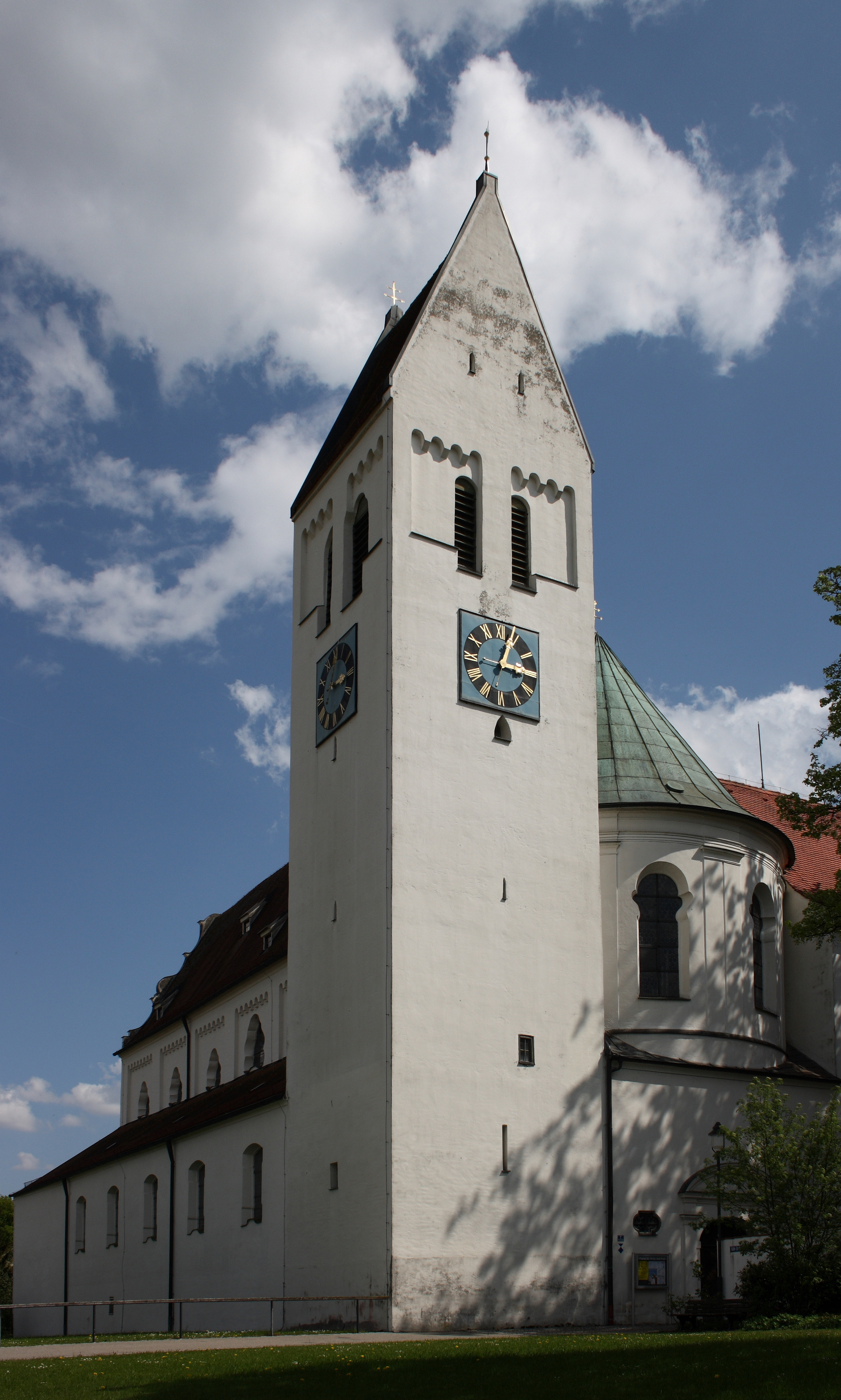
Abbey Church Sts Peter and Paul

The abbey was looted by the Hungarians in 910 and again in 955, when they met with East Frankish troops at the nearby Battle of Lechfeld. It was re-established in 1028 at the behest of Bishop Gebhard II of Regensburg and the abbot of St. Emmeram's Abbey. Thierhaupten received further estates from the Wittelsbach emperor Louis IV and was vassalized by the dukes of Bavaria-Landshut upon his death. Devastated by the troops of the Swabian League in the course of the 1504 Landshut War of Succession and again in the Schmalkaldic War of 1546/47, it was re-built and prospered, although it always remained a small community. Heavily affected by the Thirty Years' War and the War of the Spanish Succession, it was finally dissolved in 1803 in the course of the secularisation in the Electorate of Bavaria.

== Buildings ==
The buildings were sold off to a local businessman. The last abbot, Edmund Schmid, remained in Thierhaupten as the parish priest, and succeeded in 1812 in acquiring the former abbey church for use as the parish church. The remaining buildings were preserved, but gradually fell into disrepair, until they were bought by the Thierhaupten municipality administration in 1983 and renovated.
