= Großaitingen =

- Municipality
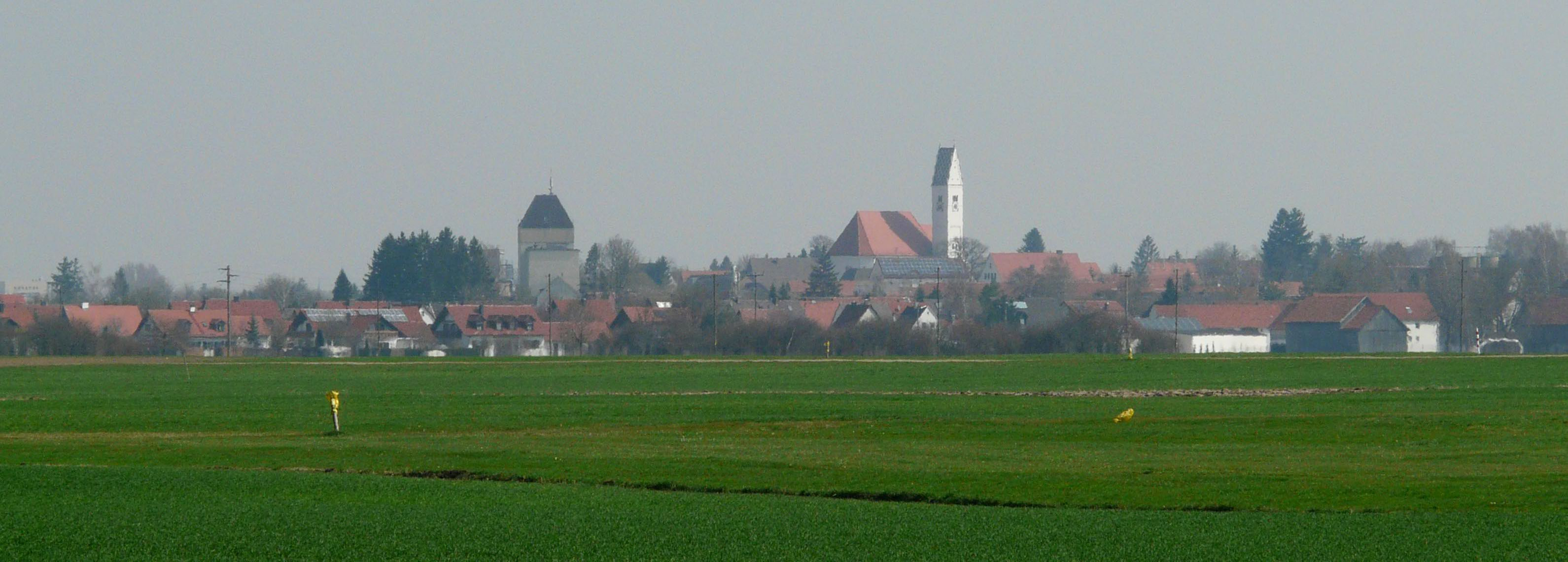
- Großaitingen seen from the southwest

- Coat of arms

- Location of Großaitingen within Augsburg district
- Interactive map of Großaitingen
- Location within Germany Location within Bavaria
- Coordinates: 48°14′N 10°47′E
- Country: Germany
- State: Bavaria
- Admin. region: Schwaben
- District: Augsburg
- Municipal assoc.: Großaitingen

Government
  - Mayor (2020–26): Erwin Goßner

Area
  - Total: 39.09 km^{2} (15.09 sq mi)
- Elevation: 539 m (1,768 ft)

Population (2025-12-31)
  - Total: 5,314
  - Density: 135.9/km^{2} (352.1/sq mi)
- Time zone: UTC+01:00 (CET)
  - Summer (DST): UTC+02:00 (CEST)
- Postal codes: 86845
- Dialling codes: 08203
- Vehicle registration: A
- Website: www.grossaitingen.de

Großaitingen is a municipality in the district of Augsburg in Bavaria in Germany. It lies on the Singold and Wertach rivers.

== Notable people ==
- Cyrill Kistler (1848-1907), composer, music theoretician, music educator and music publisher.
