= Nordendorf (Verwaltungsgemeinschaft) =

- Verwaltungsgemeinschaft
- Location of Nordendorf within Augsburg district
- Interactive map of Nordendorf
- Location within Germany Location within Bavaria
- Coordinates: 48°36′N 10°50′E
- Country: Germany
- State: Bavaria
- Admin. region: Swabia
- District: Augsburg
- Seat: Nordendorf
- Subdivisions: 6 municipalities

Area
  - Total: 54.85 km^{2} (21.18 sq mi)

Population (2025-12-31)
  - Total: 8,538
  - Density: 155.7/km^{2} (403.2/sq mi)
- Time zone: UTC+01:00 (CET)
  - Summer (DST): UTC+02:00 (CEST)
- Website: www.vg-nordendorf.de

Nordendorf is a Verwaltungsgemeinschaft (municipal association) in the district of Augsburg in Bavaria, Germany. Its seat is in Nordendorf.

It consists of the following municipalities:

1. Allmannshofen
2. Ehingen
3. Ellgau
4. Kühlenthal
5. Nordendorf
6. Westendorf
