= Theodor Haecker =

German writer (1879–1945)

- Born: 4 June 1879; Eberbach, Germany
- Died: 9 April 1945 (aged 65); Ustersbach, Germany
- Citizenship: German
- Occupations: Writer, translator

Theodor Haecker (4 June 1879 – 9 April 1945) was a German writer, translator and cultural critic.

== Life ==
Haecker was a translator into German of Kierkegaard and Cardinal Newman. He wrote an essay, Kierkegaard and the Philosophy of Inwardness in 1913 at a time when few had heard of Haecker and even fewer had heard of Kierkegaard. After that he translated Newman's Grammar of Assent and became a Roman Catholic convert in April 1921.

Haecker is known for his consistent opposition to the Nazi regime and his connections with the German resistance, such as the White Rose. From 1935 he was not allowed to speak in public and from 1938 he was forbidden to publish books. It was during this time that he wrote his most important work, the journal titled collectively as Journal in the Night. They are the documents of an intellectual's inner resistance against National Socialism. Haecker's achievement can be considered an important foundation of Christian resistance to National Socialism. Haecker had links with the circle around the Scholl siblings, where he read excerpts from his Journal in the Night.

In early 1944, Haecker's house was completely destroyed during the bombing of Munich. With his sight failing due to worsening diabetes, he left Munich to live the last months of his life in the small village of Ustersbach near Augsburg. His daughter visited him but his son, Reinhard had been sent to the Russian front in early 1945, and was shortly after reported missing. Theodor Haecker died on 9 April 1945 and is buried in Ustersbach. There is a bust by sculptor Gerold Jäggle atop a fountain dedicated to Haecker in Laupheim near Ulm, paid for by the local citizens.

== Work ==
Among his papers was a manuscript possibly written in 1943 and published in English in 1950 as Kierkegaard The Cripple. Haecker questions the claim by Rikard Magnussen, in his two books Søren Kierkegaard seen from the Outside and The Special Cross, that Kierkegaard was a hunchback. Haecker asks: 'What significance can be attached to an exterior, physical examination of someone whose work and achievements lie solely in the intellectual and spiritual realms of memory and of historical tradition and experience, as in the case of Kierkegaard? (...) Is there any point in trying to explain the connection between Kierkegaard's physical appearance and his inner self, the purely materially visible and spiritually non-sensual and invisible? Would not this make the inner man, the outer, and the outer man, the inner, which is precisely what Kierkegaard so passionately protested?" Yet, Haecker goes on "to examine the thesis that Kierkegaard's psychological structure was influenced by his deformity." He tried to relate Kierkegaard's inner life to his outer appearance.

The translator, Alexander Dru, says about Haecker's Journal in the Night, "This book, reminiscent in form of Pascal's Pensées, is his last testimony to the truth and a confession of faith that is a spontaneous rejoinder to a particular moment in history. It is written by a man intent, by nature, on the search for truth, and driven, by circumstance, to seek for it in anguish, in solitude, with an urgency that grips the reader." In the opening to Dru's translation, Jacques Maritain (misspelled "Jacques Maratain") is quoted as saying, "Theodor Haecker was a man of deep insight and rare intellectual integrity — a Knight of Faith to use Kierkegaard's expression. The testimony of this great Christian has an outstanding value."

== Publications in English ==
- Virgil, Father of the West; translated by Arthur Wesley Wheen (Sheed & Ward: London, 1934)
- Søren Kierkegaard, by Theodore Haecker, translated, and With a Biographical Note, by Alexander Dru (Oxford University Press, 1937). (The first part was given in the form of a lecture in Zurich in 1924 and the second part the epilogue to his translation of Kierkegaard's Discourses at Communion Service on Friday, 1851.)
- Journal in the Night; translated by Alexander Dru; With a biographical and critical introduction by the translator (Pantheon Books, 1950)
- Kierkegaard The Cripple, by Theodor Haecker, translated by C. Vasn O. Bruyn, With an Introduction by A. Dru, Published 1950 by the Philosophical Library Inc.
