= Langerringen (Verwaltungsgemeinschaft) =

- Verwaltungsgemeinschaft
- Location of Langerringen within Augsburg district
- Interactive map of Langerringen
- Location within Germany Location within Bavaria
- Coordinates: 48°09′N 10°46′E
- Country: Germany
- State: Bavaria
- Admin. region: Swabia
- District: Augsburg
- Seat: Langerringen
- Subdivisions: 2 municipalities

Area
  - Total: 56.65 km^{2} (21.87 sq mi)

Population (2025-12-31)
  - Total: 5,851
  - Density: 103.3/km^{2} (267.5/sq mi)
- Time zone: UTC+01:00 (CET)
  - Summer (DST): UTC+02:00 (CEST)

Langerringen is a Verwaltungsgemeinschaft (municipal association) in the district of Augsburg in Bavaria, Germany. Its seat is in Langerringen.

It consists of the following municipalities:

1. Hiltenfingen
2. Langerringen
