= Langweid am Lech =

- Municipality
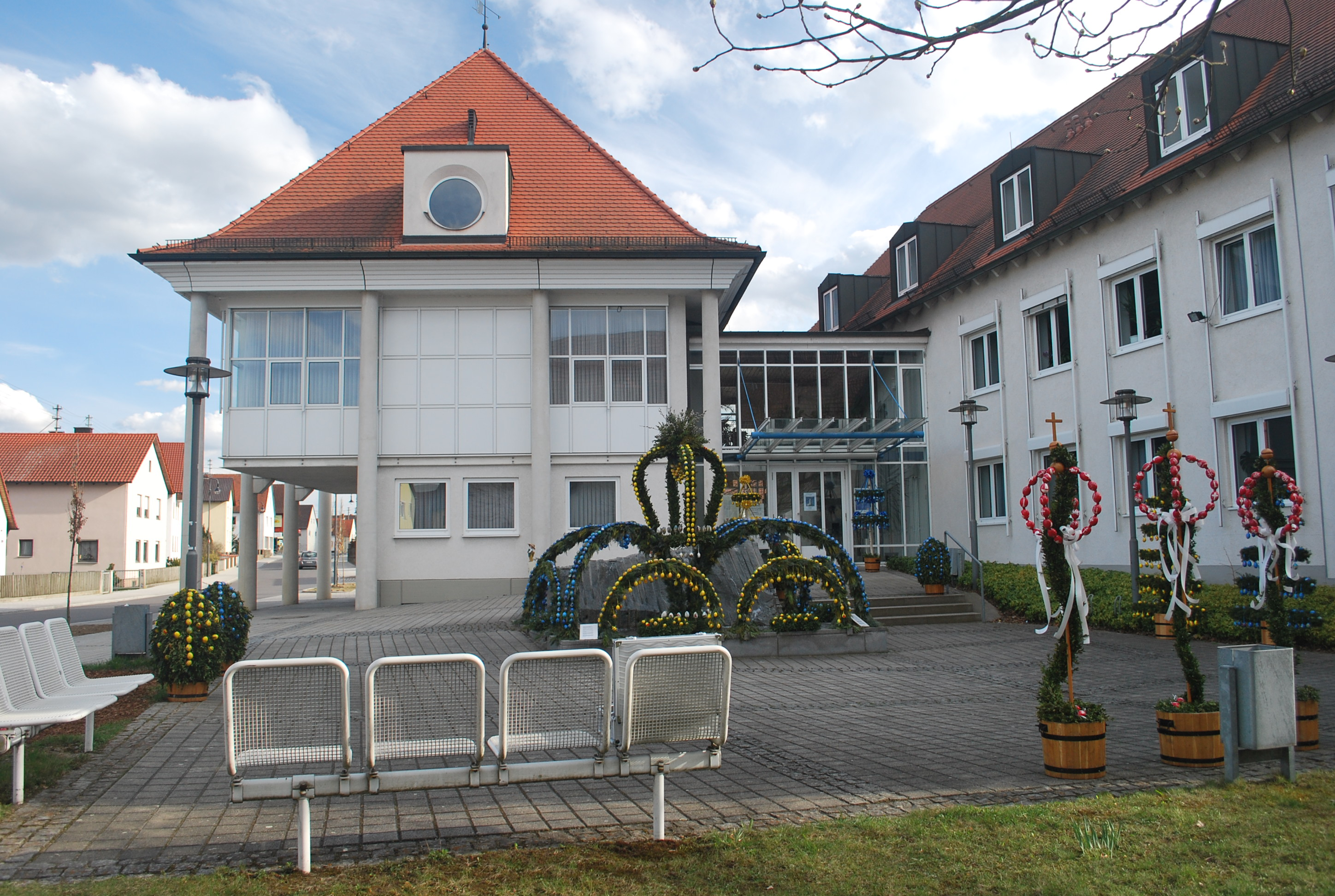
- Town hall

- Coat of arms

- Location of Langweid am Lech within Augsburg district
- Interactive map of Langweid am Lech
- Location within Germany Location within Bavaria
- Coordinates: 48°29′N 10°51′E
- Country: Germany
- State: Bavaria
- Admin. region: Schwaben
- District: Augsburg

Government
  - Mayor (2020–26): Jürgen Gilg (CSU)

Area
  - Total: 23.55 km^{2} (9.09 sq mi)
- Elevation: 450 m (1,480 ft)

Population (2025-12-31)
  - Total: 8,818
  - Density: 374.4/km^{2} (969.8/sq mi)
- Time zone: UTC+01:00 (CET)
  - Summer (DST): UTC+02:00 (CEST)
- Postal codes: 86462
- Dialling codes: 08230
- Vehicle registration: A
- Website: www.langweid.de

Langweid am Lech (German pronunciation: [ˈlaŋvaɪt ʔam ˈlɛç], lit. 'Langweid on the Lech') is a municipality and a village in the district of Augsburg in Bavaria, Germany.

The municipality is located on the river Lech, 9 miles north of Augsburg.

On 28 July 2023, three people were killed and two others injured in a spree shooting.
