= Ehingen, Swabia =

Ehingen
- Municipality
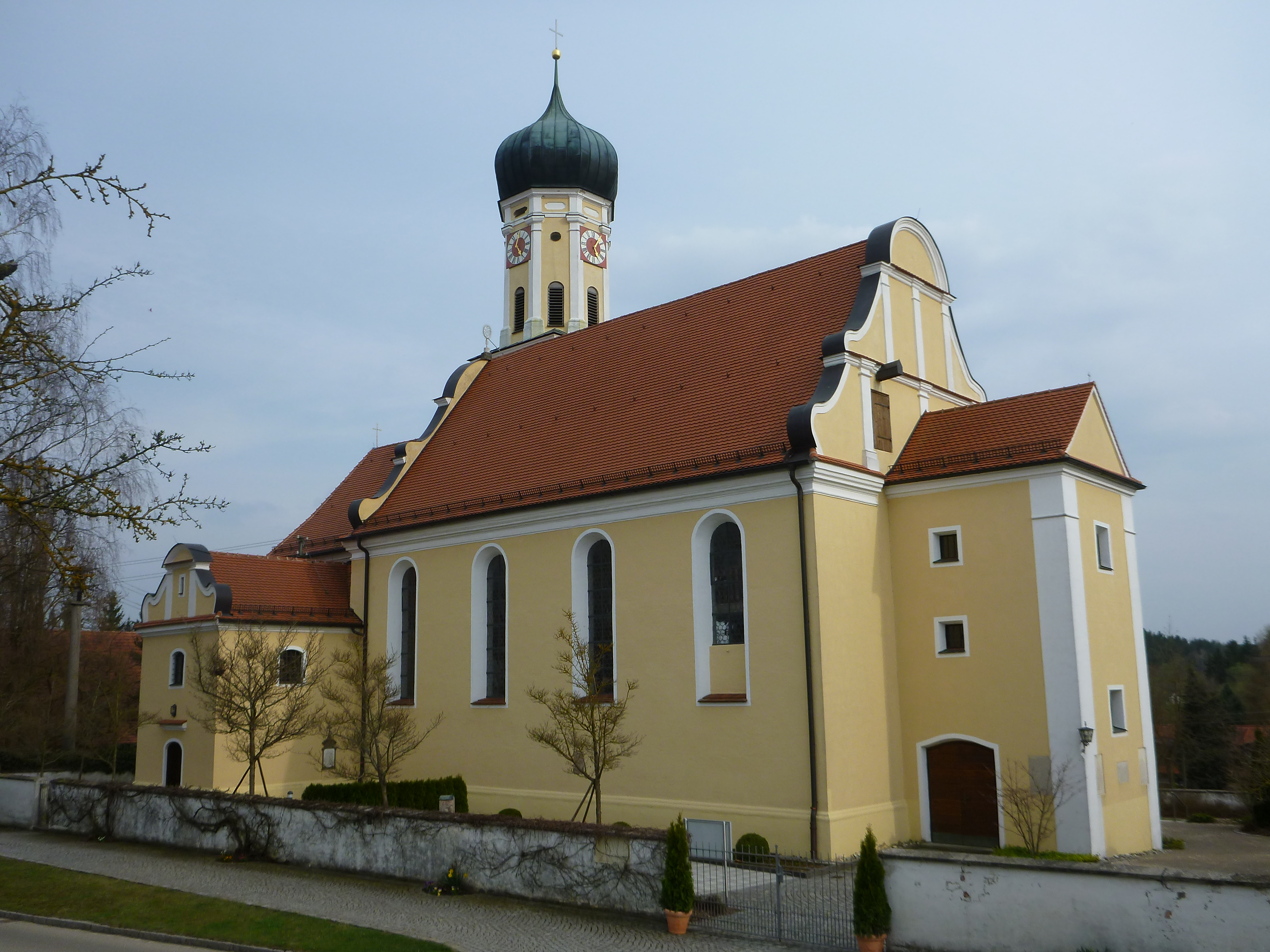
- Church of Saint Lawrence

- Coat of arms

- Location of Ehingen within Augsburg district
- Interactive map of Ehingen
- Location within Germany Location within Bavaria
- Coordinates: 48°36′N 10°48′E
- Country: Germany
- State: Bavaria
- Admin. region: Schwaben
- District: Augsburg
- Municipal assoc.: Nordendorf

Government
  - Mayor (2020–26): Franz Schlögel

Area
  - Total: 9.65 km^{2} (3.73 sq mi)
- Elevation: 443 m (1,453 ft)

Population (2025-12-31)
  - Total: 1,158
  - Density: 120/km^{2} (311/sq mi)
- Time zone: UTC+01:00 (CET)
  - Summer (DST): UTC+02:00 (CEST)
- Postal codes: 86678
- Dialling codes: 08273
- Vehicle registration: A
- Website: www.ehingen-gemeinde.de

Ehingen (German pronunciation: [ˈeː(h)ɪŋən]) is a municipality in the district of Augsburg in Bavaria in Germany.
