= Biberbach, Bavaria =

- Municipality
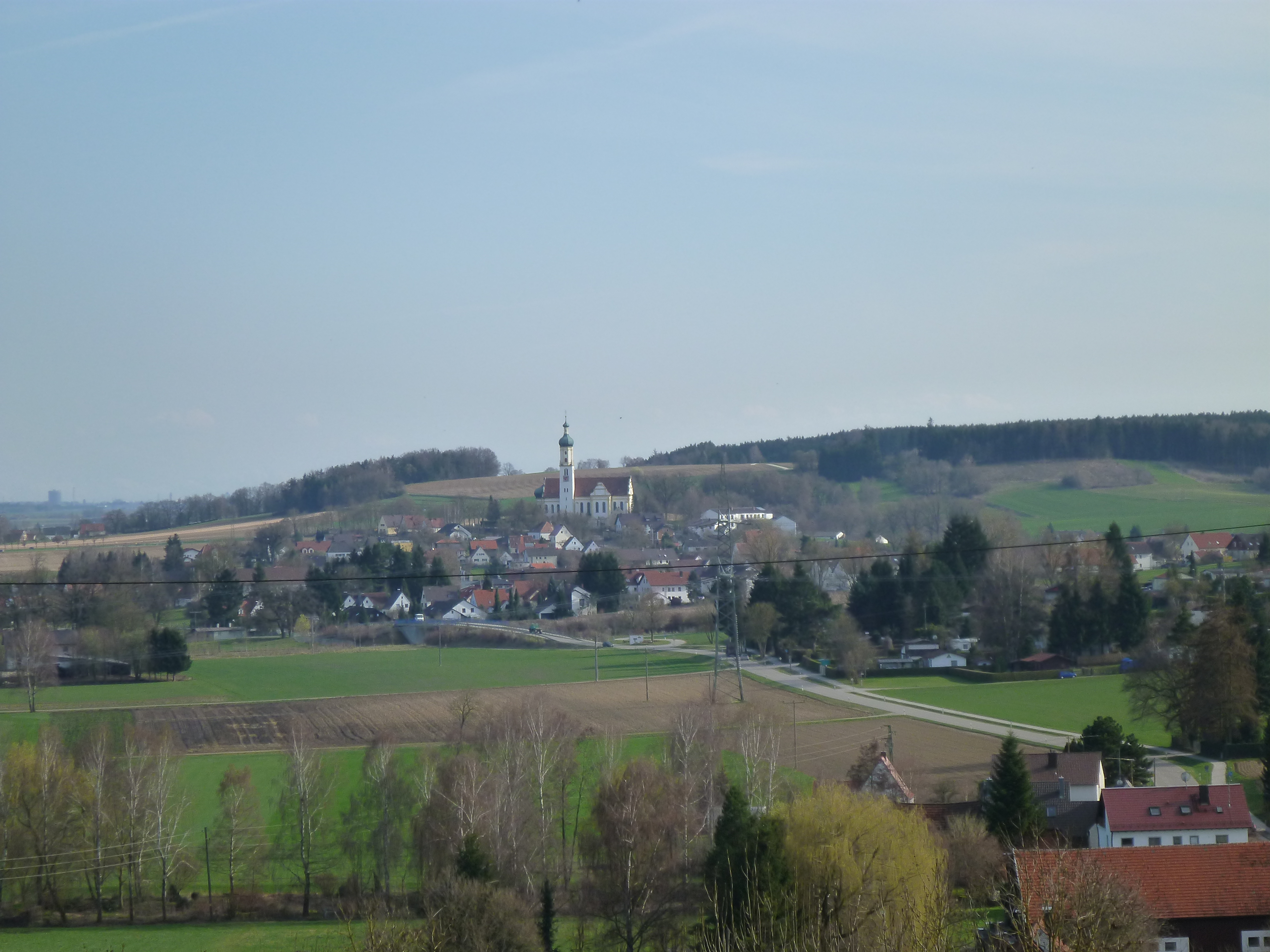
- Biberach as seen from Markt Castle

- Coat of arms

- Location of Biberbach, Bavaria within Augsburg district
- Interactive map of Biberbach, Bavaria
- Location within Germany Location within Bavaria
- Coordinates: 48°31′N 10°49′E
- Country: Germany
- State: Bavaria
- Admin. region: Schwaben
- District: Augsburg

Government
  - Mayor (2020–26): Wolfgang Jarasch

Area
  - Total: 36.86 km^{2} (14.23 sq mi)
- Elevation: 464 m (1,522 ft)

Population (2025-12-31)
  - Total: 3,475
  - Density: 94.28/km^{2} (244.2/sq mi)
- Time zone: UTC+01:00 (CET)
  - Summer (DST): UTC+02:00 (CEST)
- Postal codes: 86485
- Dialling codes: 08271
- Vehicle registration: A
- Website: www.biberbach.de

Biberbach (German pronunciation: [ˈbiːbɐbax]) is a municipality in the northern part of the district of Augsburg in Bavaria in Germany. A famous baroque pilgrimage church (Holy Cross) is located on the hill above the village.

First mentioned in 1070, the village was part of the Duchy of Swabia. In 1514 the lordship was purchased by Jakob Fugger. Markt castle became the seat of the administration of the Biberbach district of the Fugger county. Later it was owned by the counts and princes Fugger of Babenhausen. In 1806 it became part of the Kingdom of Bavaria.

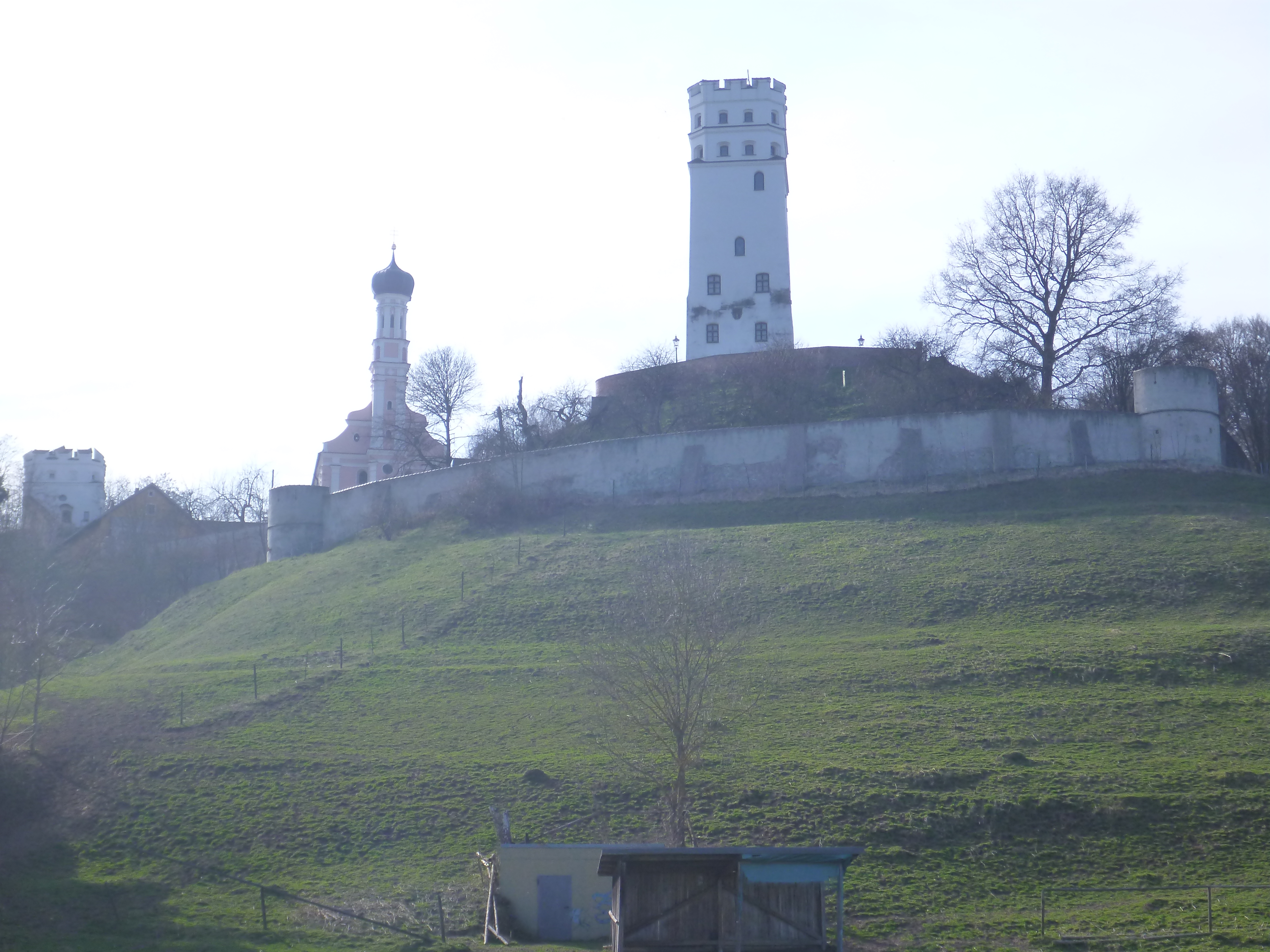
Remains of Markt Castle
