= Neusäß =

Neusäß Neisäß (Swabian)
- Municipality
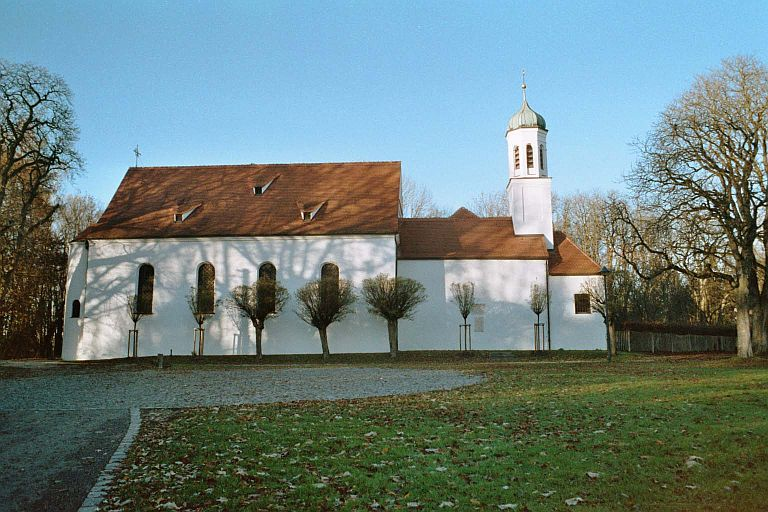
- The pilgrimage church Maria Loreto on the Kobel mountain

- Coat of arms

- Location of Neusäß within Augsburg district
- Interactive map of Neusäß
- Location within Germany Location within Bavaria
- Coordinates: 48°24′N 10°50′E
- Country: Germany
- State: Bavaria
- Admin. region: Schwaben
- District: Augsburg

Government
  - Mayor (2020–26): Richard Greiner (CSU)

Area
  - Total: 25.22 km^{2} (9.74 sq mi)
- Elevation: 476–485 m (1,562–1,591 ft)

Population (2025-12-31)
  - Total: 23,026
  - Density: 913.0/km^{2} (2,365/sq mi)
- Time zone: UTC+01:00 (CET)
  - Summer (DST): UTC+02:00 (CEST)
- Postal codes: 86356
- Dialling codes: 0821
- Vehicle registration: A
- Website: www.neusaess.de

Neusäß (German pronunciation: [ˈnɔʏzɛːs]; Swabian: Neisäß), also given in English as Neusaess, is a town in the District of Augsburg, Bavaria, Germany. The town lies on the Schmutter river and borders the city of Augsburg. As of 2018, the city had 22,164 inhabitants.

== Town districts ==
- Alt-Neusäß
- Hainhofen
- Hammel
- Westheim
- Schlipsheim
- Täfertingen
- Ottmarshausen
- Steppach

== History ==
Neusaess is a union from 8 formerly independent villages, which united in the years 1972 and 1977, in order to avoid the threatening incorporation by Augsburg.

Since 2014, Richard Greiner (CSU) has been mayor of Neusäß.

== Attractions ==
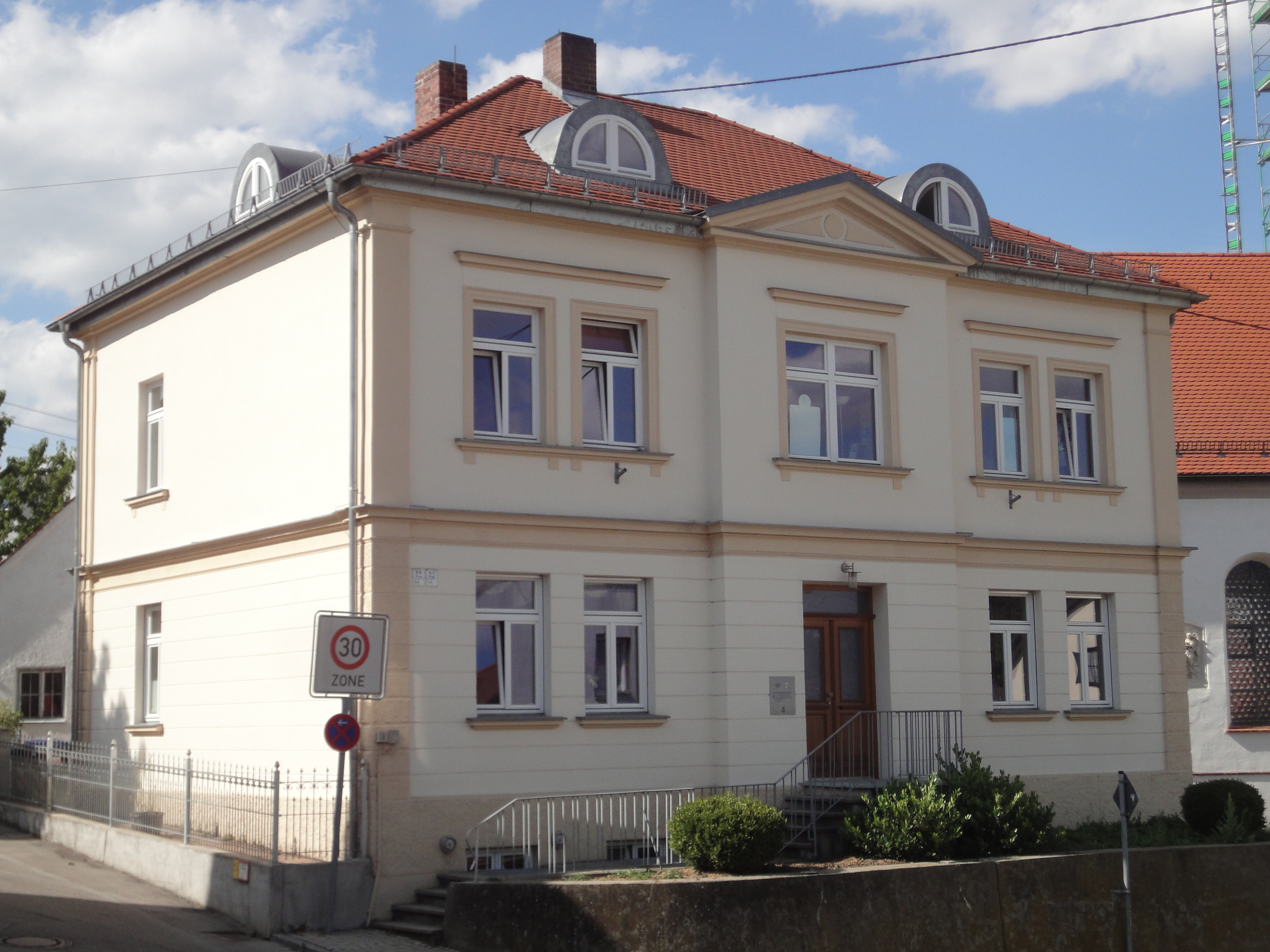
Täfertingen Rectory

- Pilgrimage church Maria Loreto on the Kobel (Westheim)
- Schloss Hainhofen
- Schloss Hamel
- Bismarckturm (Steppach)
- Titania hot springs
- Schmutter

== Twin towns — Sister cities ==
Neusäß is twinned with:

- Cusset, France
- Eksjö, Sweden
- Markkleeberg, Germany
- Bracciano, Italy

== Notable people ==
- Sena Jurinac (1921–2011), Lederle, soprano and member of the Viennese Mozart ensemble, lived from 1973 until her death in Hainhofen
