= Nordendorf =

- Municipality
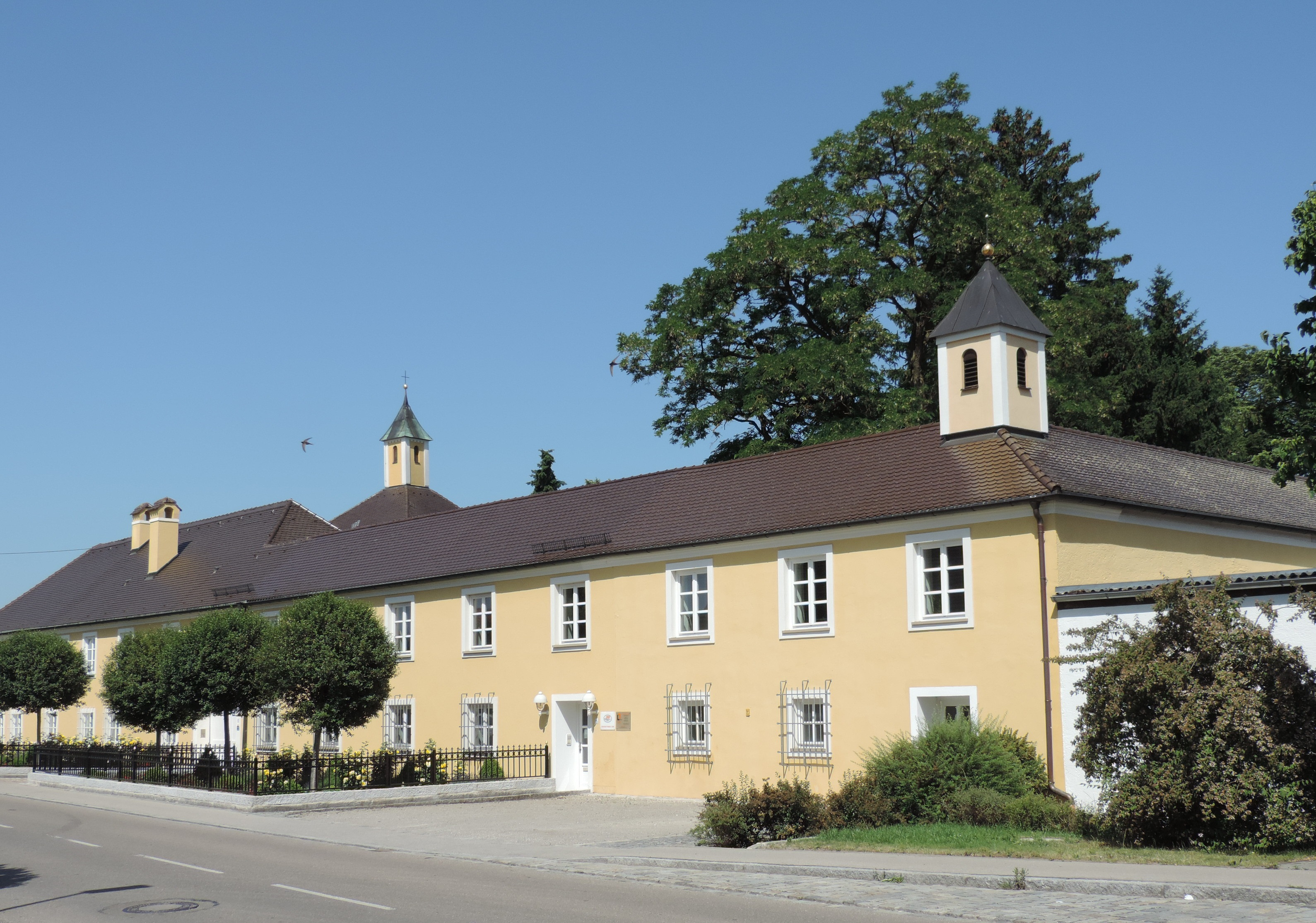
- Nordendorf Castle

- Coat of arms

- Location of Nordendorf within Augsburg district
- Interactive map of Nordendorf
- Location within Germany Location within Bavaria
- Coordinates: 48°36′N 10°50′E
- Country: Germany
- State: Bavaria
- Admin. region: Schwaben
- District: Augsburg
- Municipal assoc.: Nordendorf

Government
  - Mayor (2020–26): Tobias Kunz

Area
  - Total: 7.51 km^{2} (2.90 sq mi)
- Elevation: 422 m (1,385 ft)

Population (2025-12-31)
  - Total: 2,660
  - Density: 354/km^{2} (917/sq mi)
- Time zone: UTC+01:00 (CET)
  - Summer (DST): UTC+02:00 (CEST)
- Postal codes: 86695
- Dialling codes: 08273
- Vehicle registration: A
- Website: www.nordendorf.de

Nordendorf is a municipality in the district of Augsburg in Bavaria, Germany.

== Geography ==
Nordendorf is located on the federal highway 2 and the railway line Augsburg - Donauwörth, and Blankenburg, which is stretching southwest up the Schmutterleite, form the current community since 1975. Northwest of Nordendorf is the monastery Holzen.

== History ==
The name Nordendorf is of Franconian origin; evidence of an Alamanni forerunner settlement from around the middle of the 6th century came in 1844 when a row of 433 graves was uncovered on the occasion of the construction of the Augsburg-Donauwörth railway line, making the site one of the most important sites of the early Middle Ages in the Swabian-Bavarian region. The most important archaeological finds are the hanger brooches of Nordendorf, two clasps with runic inscriptions engraved on the back.

The current name is mentioned for the first time in 1213. Initially the lords of Donnsberg, Truchsesse of the Augsburg bishops, who had their castle on Donnsberg west of Nordendorf, were the lords of the manor. Around 1268 the Wittelsbachers destroyed Donnsberg Castle and Nordendorf came into their possession. In 1560 a new castle was built in the middle of the village, which burnt down in 1862. In 1580 a branch of the Fugger family had acquired the Nordendorf estate. This line lived here until 1878.

After the Second World War Nordendorf developed from an agricultural village to an attractive residential community with an interesting surrounding area between Schmutter and Lech and the local recreation area "Augsburg Western Forests".

Today, agriculture is concentrated in the district of Blankenburg.

== Politics ==
=== Parish council ===
Distribution of seats in the 14-member council (as local elections 2008 ) :

- CSU : 5 seats
- SPD / Active Citizens : 5 seats
- CDU : 4 seats

=== Mayor ===
Tobias Kunz (Freie Wähler Nordendorf/Blankenburg) has been mayor of Nordendorf since 2020.

=== Coat of arms ===
The Heraldic description is: "Split of blue and silver, therein over a red ring a top-tinned bar in counterchanged colours."

== Partner city ==
A partnership with the French commune Biesles (Haute-Marne) has existed since July 15, 1973.

== See also ==
- Nordendorf fibulae
