= Aystetten =

- Municipality
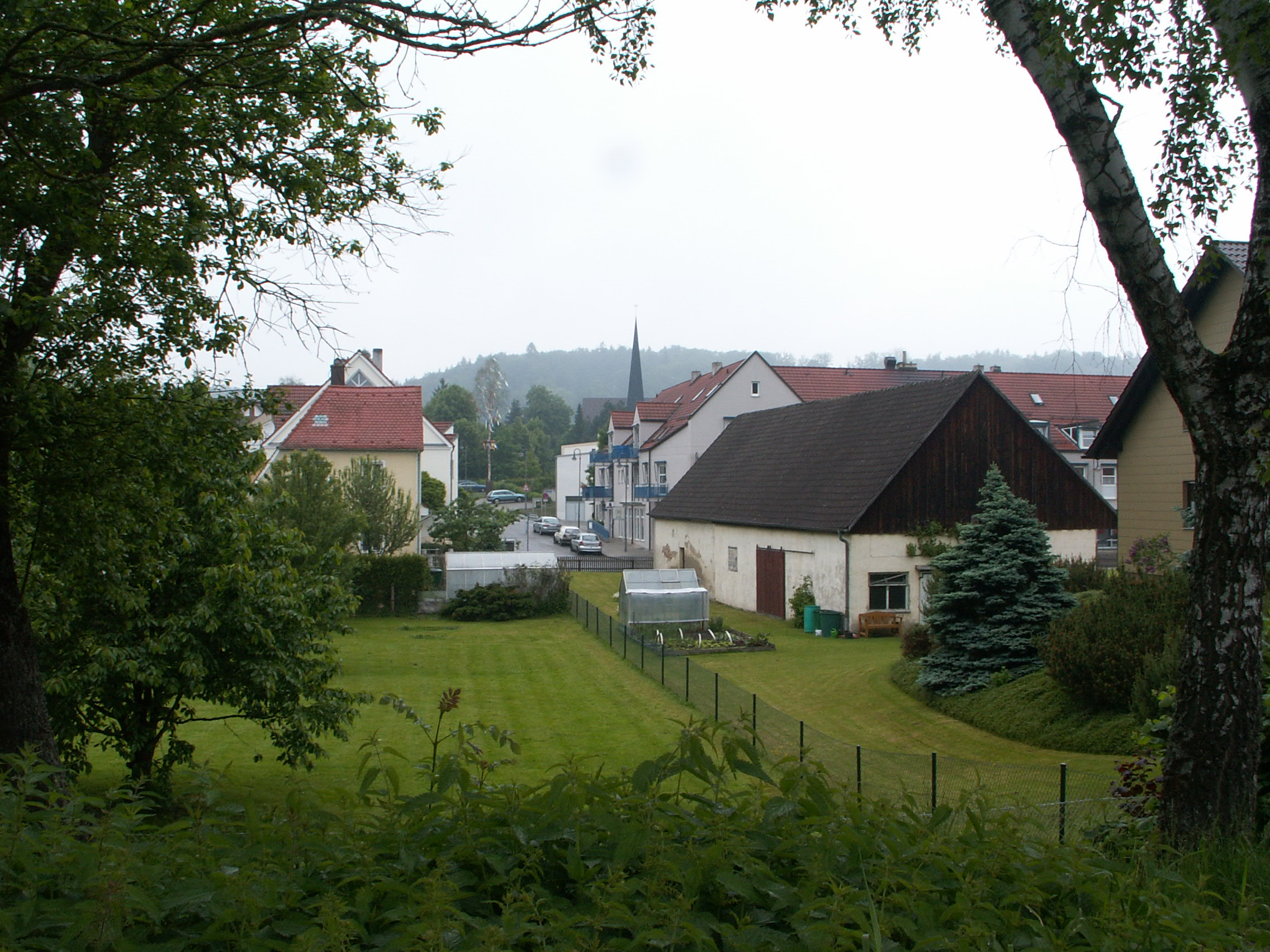
- Aystetten

- Coat of arms

- Location of Aystetten within Augsburg district
- Interactive map of Aystetten
- Location within Germany Location within Bavaria
- Coordinates: 48°24′N 10°46′E
- Country: Germany
- State: Bavaria
- Admin. region: Schwaben
- District: Augsburg

Government
  - Mayor (2020–26): Peter Wendel (FW)

Area
  - Total: 9.35 km^{2} (3.61 sq mi)
- Elevation: 485 m (1,591 ft)

Population (2025-12-31)
  - Total: 3,062
  - Density: 327/km^{2} (848/sq mi)
- Time zone: UTC+01:00 (CET)
  - Summer (DST): UTC+02:00 (CEST)
- Postal codes: 86482
- Dialling codes: 0821
- Vehicle registration: A
- Website: www.aystetten.de

Aystetten is a municipality in the district of Augsburg in Bavaria in Germany.

== Population ==
In the area of the municipality in 1970 there were 1,900 people. In 1987, 2,383 people lived in Aystetten. As of the census of 2000, 3,078 people lived in about 1,250 households counted. In the town the population was spread out, with 200 children up to 6 years old, 213 between 6 and 12 years, 204 young people between 12 and 18 years, 500 people over 65 years.
