= Gessertshausen =

- Municipality
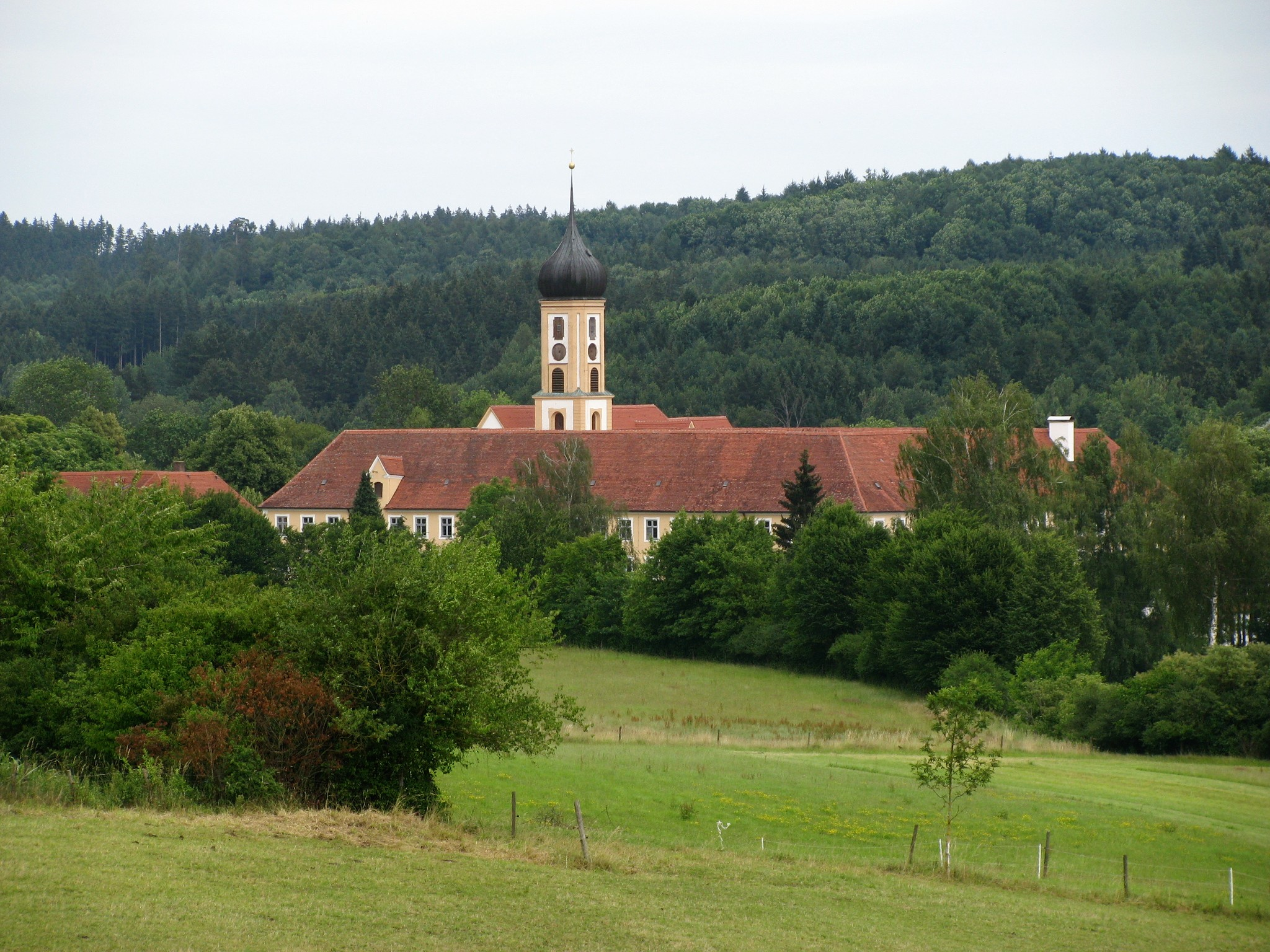
- Oberschönenfeld Abbey

- Coat of arms

- Location of Gessertshausen within Augsburg district
- Interactive map of Gessertshausen
- Location within Germany Location within Bavaria
- Coordinates: 48°20′N 10°44′E
- Country: Germany
- State: Bavaria
- Admin. region: Schwaben
- District: Augsburg
- Municipal assoc.: Gessertshausen

Government
  - Mayor (2022–28): Jürgen Mögele (CSU)

Area
  - Total: 41.34 km^{2} (15.96 sq mi)
- Elevation: 478 m (1,568 ft)

Population (2025-12-31)
  - Total: 4,380
  - Density: 106/km^{2} (274/sq mi)
- Time zone: UTC+01:00 (CET)
  - Summer (DST): UTC+02:00 (CEST)
- Postal codes: 86459
- Dialling codes: 08238
- Vehicle registration: A
- Website: www.gessertshausen.de

Gessertshausen is a municipality in the district of Augsburg in Bavaria in Germany. It lies on the river Schmutter.
