= Altenmünster =

- Municipality
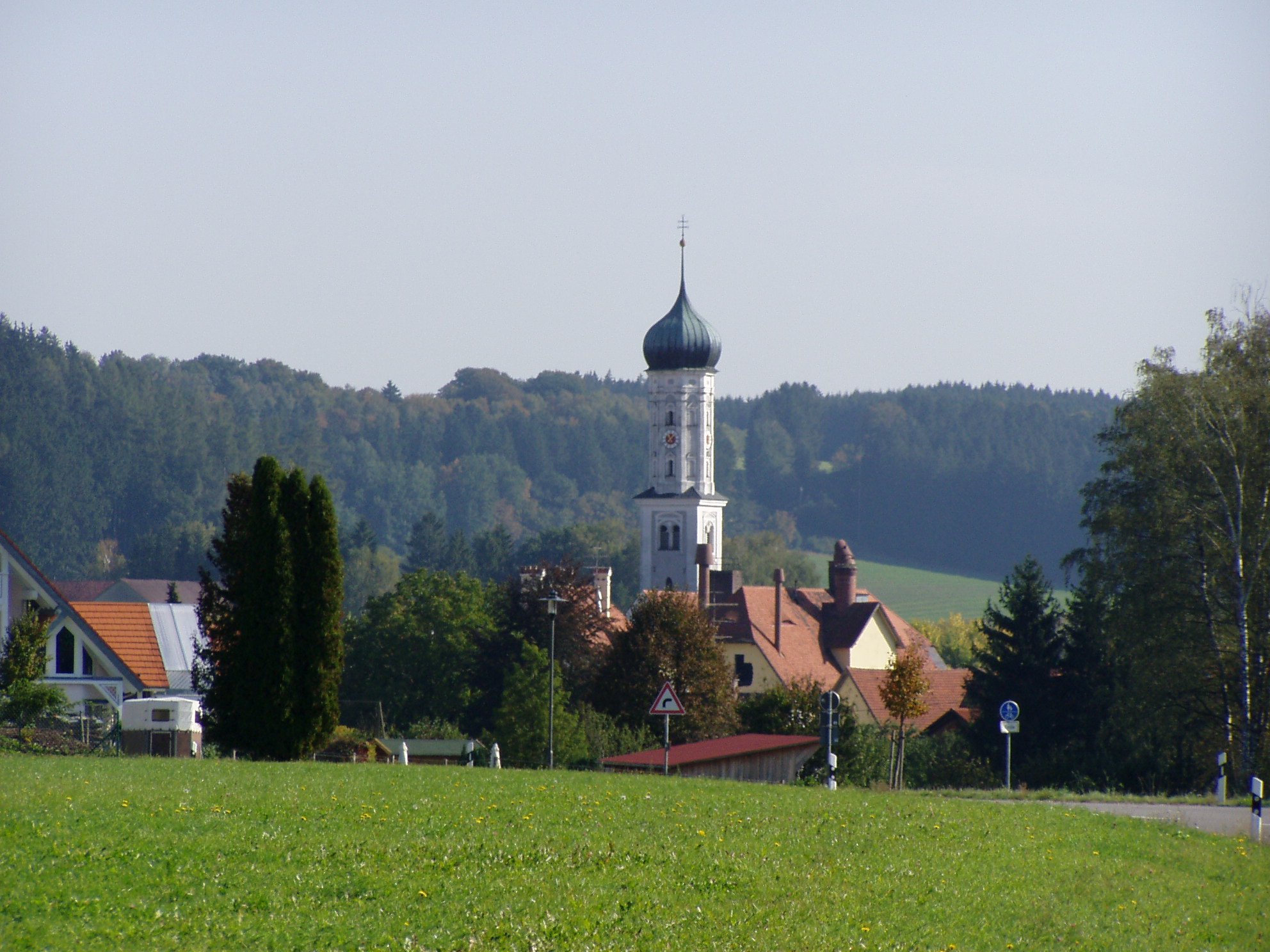
- Altenmünster

- Coat of arms

- Location of Altenmünster within Augsburg district
- Interactive map of Altenmünster
- Location within Germany Location within Bavaria
- Coordinates: 48°28′N 10°36′E
- Country: Germany
- State: Bavaria
- Admin. region: Schwaben
- District: Augsburg

Government
  - Mayor (2020–26): Florian Mair

Area
  - Total: 41.30 km^{2} (15.95 sq mi)
- Elevation: 435 m (1,427 ft)

Population (2025-12-31)
  - Total: 4,826
  - Density: 116.9/km^{2} (302.6/sq mi)
- Time zone: UTC+01:00 (CET)
  - Summer (DST): UTC+02:00 (CEST)
- Postal codes: 86450
- Dialling codes: 08295
- Vehicle registration: A
- Website: www.altenmuenster.de

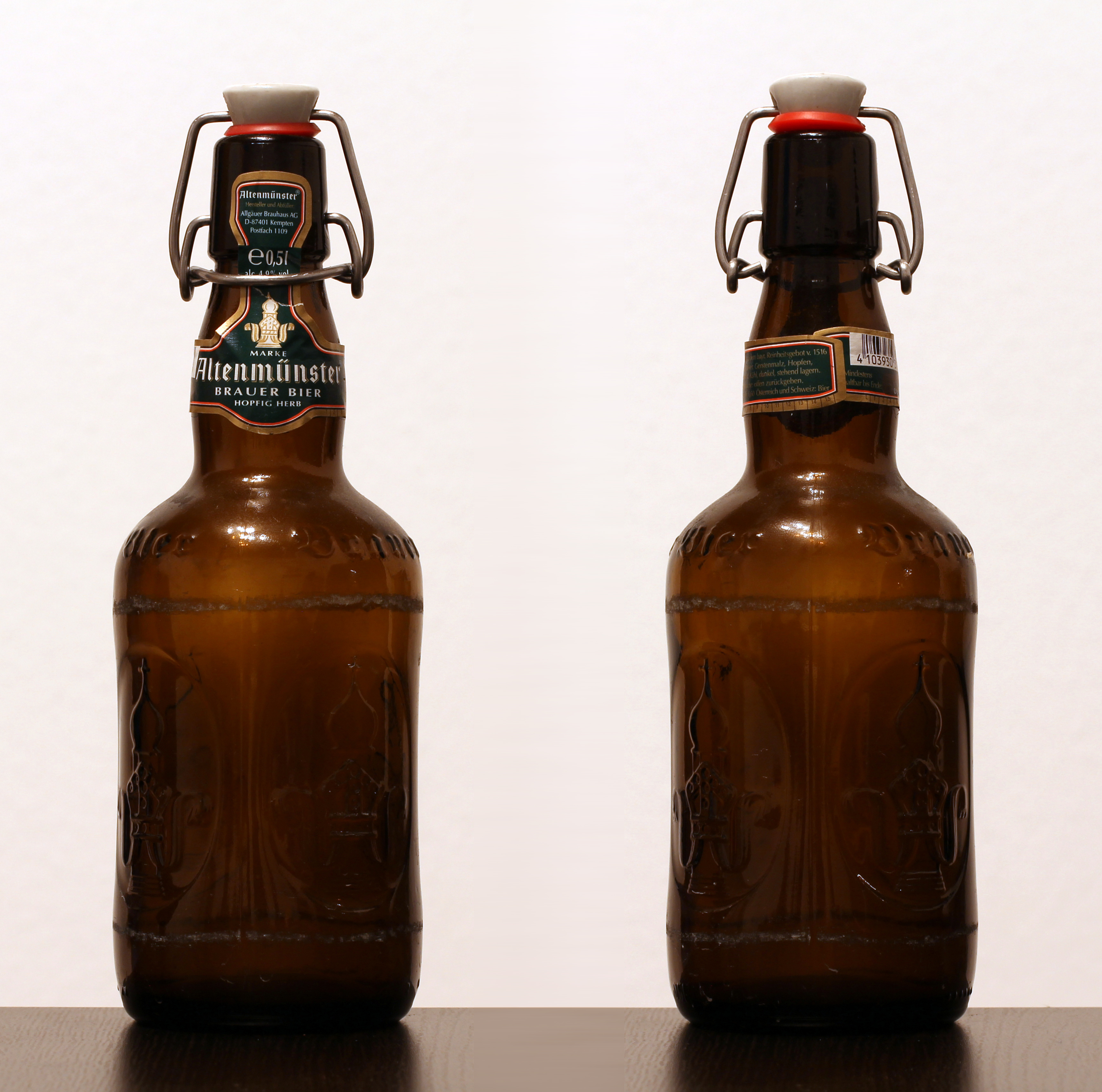
Altenmünster Brauer Bier Hopfig Herb - A beer brewed at the Altenmünster Brewery

Altenmünster is a municipality in the district of Augsburg in Bavaria in Germany.
