= Auerbach (Günz) =

River in Germany

- Location of mouth in Bavaria

Location
- Country: Germany
- State: Bavaria

Physical characteristics
- Mouth
  - location: Günz
  - coordinates: 48.1444°N 10.2453°E
- Length: 12.7 km (7.9 mi)

Basin features
- Progression: Günz→ Danube→ Black Sea

Auerbach (German pronunciation: [ˈaʊɐbax]) is a river in Bavaria, Germany. It is a left tributary of the Günz in Babenhausen.

== See also ==
- List of rivers of Bavaria
