= Westendorf (Schmutter) =

- Municipality
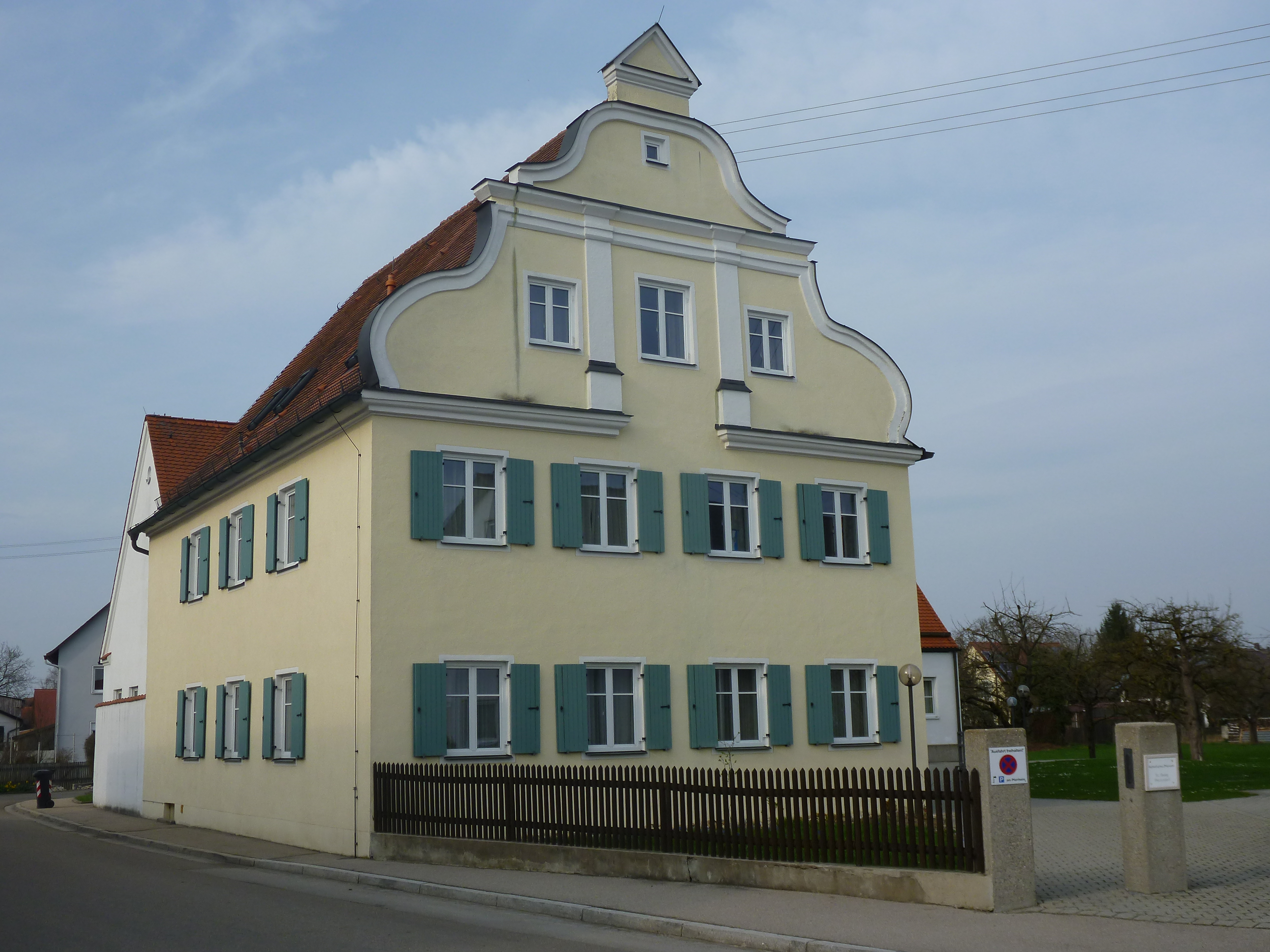
- Rectory

- Coat of arms

- Location of Westendorf within Augsburg district
- Interactive map of Westendorf
- Location within Germany Location within Bavaria
- Coordinates: 48°34′N 10°50′E
- Country: Germany
- State: Bavaria
- Admin. region: Schwaben
- District: Augsburg
- Municipal assoc.: Nordendorf

Government
  - Mayor (2020–26): Steffen Richter

Area
  - Total: 6.32 km^{2} (2.44 sq mi)
- Elevation: 425 m (1,394 ft)

Population (2025-12-31)
  - Total: 1,743
  - Density: 276/km^{2} (714/sq mi)
- Time zone: UTC+01:00 (CET)
  - Summer (DST): UTC+02:00 (CEST)
- Postal codes: 86707
- Dialling codes: 08273
- Vehicle registration: A
- Website: www.westendorf.de

Westendorf (German pronunciation: [ˈvɛstn̩ˌdɔʁf]) is a municipality in the district of Augsburg in Bavaria in Germany. It lies on the river Schmutter.
