= Kühlenthal =

- Municipality
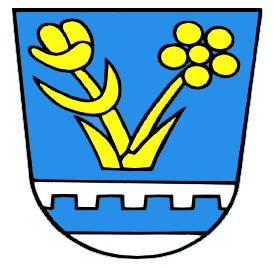
- Coat of arms

- Location of Kühlenthal within Augsburg district
- Interactive map of Kühlenthal
- Location within Germany Location within Bavaria
- Coordinates: 48°34′N 10°49′E
- Country: Germany
- State: Bavaria
- Admin. region: Schwaben
- District: Augsburg
- Municipal assoc.: Nordendorf

Government
  - Mayor (2020–26): Iris Harms

Area
  - Total: 7.13 km^{2} (2.75 sq mi)
- Elevation: 430 m (1,410 ft)

Population (2025-12-31)
  - Total: 838
  - Density: 118/km^{2} (304/sq mi)
- Time zone: UTC+01:00 (CET)
  - Summer (DST): UTC+02:00 (CEST)
- Postal codes: 86707
- Dialling codes: 08273
- Vehicle registration: A
- Website: www.kuehlenthal.de

Kühlenthal is a municipality in the district of Augsburg in Bavaria in Germany.
