= Ellgau =

- Municipality
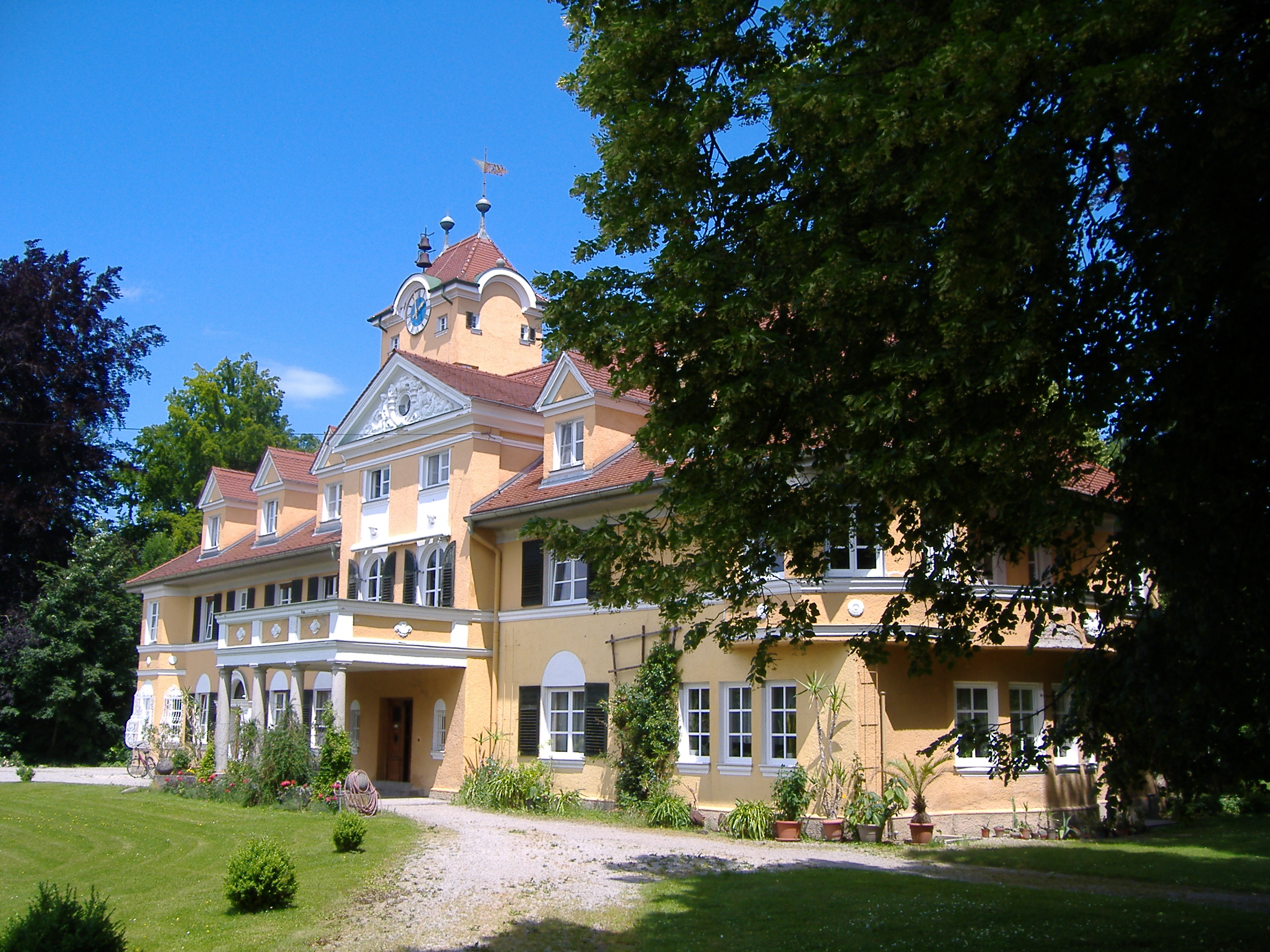
- Herrlehof

- Coat of arms

- Location of Ellgau within Augsburg district
- Interactive map of Ellgau
- Location within Germany Location within Bavaria
- Coordinates: 48°36′N 10°52′E
- Country: Germany
- State: Bavaria
- Admin. region: Schwaben
- District: Augsburg
- Municipal assoc.: Nordendorf

Government
  - Mayor (2020–26): Christine Gumpp

Area
  - Total: 13.89 km^{2} (5.36 sq mi)
- Elevation: 1,019 m (3,343 ft)

Population (2025-12-31)
  - Total: 1,163
  - Density: 83.73/km^{2} (216.9/sq mi)
- Time zone: UTC+01:00 (CET)
  - Summer (DST): UTC+02:00 (CEST)
- Postal codes: 86679
- Dialling codes: 08273
- Vehicle registration: A
- Website: www.ellgau.de

Ellgau is a municipality in the district of Augsburg in Bavaria, Germany.
