= Augsburg (district) =

Coordinates: 48°25′N 10°50′E

- District
- Flag Coat of arms
- Country: Germany
- State: Bavaria
- Adm. region: Swabia
- Capital: Augsburg

Government
  - District admin.: Martin Sailer (CSU)

Area
  - Total: 1,071 km^{2} (414 sq mi)

Population (31 December 2025)
  - Total: 263,381
  - Density: 245.9/km^{2} (636.9/sq mi)
- Time zone: UTC+01:00 (CET)
  - Summer (DST): UTC+02:00 (CEST)
- Vehicle registration: A, SMÜ, WER
- Website: www.landkreis-augsburg.de

Augsburg (German pronunciation: [ˈaʊksbʊʁk]; Swabian German: Augschburg) is a Landkreis (district) in Swabia, Bavaria, Germany. It is bounded by (from the east and clockwise) the city of Augsburg and the districts of Aichach-Friedberg, Landsberg, Ostallgäu, Unterallgäu, Günzburg, Dillingen and Donau-Ries. The city of Augsburg is not part of the district, but nonetheless is its administrative seat.

== History ==
In Roman times the Via Claudia connected the city of Augsburg and Italy. In 233 the Alamanni broke through the limes, and the Roman rule over Swabia was ended. During the time of the Holy Roman Empire Augsburg was a bishopric principality. The city and the adjoining regions became subordinate to Bavaria after the Napoleonic Wars.

The district of Augsburg was established in 1972 by merging the former districts of Augsburg and Schwabmünchen and parts of other adjoining districts.

More than twice as old as Nuremberg or Munich, Augsburg was founded in 15 B.C. by the Roman commanders Drusus and Tiberius. Under the orders of their stepfather Emperor Augustus, they enslaved the Celts and Alp-dwellers and founded the military camp Augusta Vindelicorum on the site of current-day Augsburg. The camp soon became the capital of the Roman province Raetia.

Augsburg's early development was molded by its 400-year affiliation with the Roman Empire. Critical to its ascent were its military importance in the Roman Empire, as well as its favorable location at the confluence of the Alpine rivers, the Lech and the Wertach, with direct access to the most important Alpine passes. Consequently, Augsburg was situated at the intersection of many important European east-west and north-south connections. Out of these Roman roads emerged the trade routes of the Middle Ages.

In the 13th century, Augsburg became a Free Imperial City and remained so for the next 500 years. Augsburg has been a bishopric for over 1250 years.

The peak years of growth were reached in the 15th and 16th centuries through the bank and metal businesses of the merchant families Fugger and Welser. The financial power of these families fostered Augsburg's position as a cosmopolitan city, as a city of emperors and parliaments. It was a creative center for famous painters, sculptors and musicians. Augsburg is the birthplace of the Holbein family of artists and print-makers, notably Hans Holbein the Elder and Holbein, as well as composer Leopold Mozart (father of Amadeus Wolfgang), and the playwright Berthold Brecht. Rococo became so prevalent in the city that it became known as “Augsburg style”.

After the Thirty Years' War, the decorative arts came to the fore. Gold- and silversmiths as well as copper engraving and lithography flourished. The crafters guilds were very strong and their work was known internationally. At the end of the 18th century, the textile industry began its rise to prominence, followed by machine manufacturing (MAN, Diesel, Messerschmitt). Groundbreaking innovations in industry lent Augsburg international standing.

Rudolf Diesel constructed the first internal combustion engine here, Linde built the first refrigerator, and Messerschmitt created the first mass-produced jet airplane. Today, with its rich heritage, Augsburg and the region are centers for industry, science, art and culture. Augsburg has circa 275,000 inhabitants, is a university city and is the third largest economic- and industrial center in Bavaria. The city of Augsburg and its surrounding rural areas offer attractive business and industry zones and are the headquarters of research institutions and technology concerns.

Augsburg is the only German city with its own legal holiday, the Peace of Augsburg, celebrated on August 8 of every year, to commemorate the religious parity declared in Augsburg in 1555. This gives Augsburg more legal holidays than any other region or city in Germany.

== Geography ==
The district comprises a large area west of the city of Augsburg. 90% are located in the Augsburg-Westliche Wälder Nature Park, which is a hilly region covered with forests. It is sparsely populated and crisscrossed by brooks, flowing either eastwards to the Lech or northwards to the Danube. The Lech forms the eastern border of the district.

The six cities (see below) are all situated in the easternmost part of the district, mainly in the vicinity of Augsburg. The western forest region consists of small villages.

== Coat of arms ==
The coat of arms displays:

- top: the red and white colours of Augsburg
- bottom left: the cross from the arms of the former district of Schwabmünchen
- bottom right: the family arms of the Fugger

== Towns and municipalities ==
Clickable map of towns and municipalities in the district

Towns
1. Bobingen
2. Gersthofen
3. Königsbrunn
4. Neusäß
5. Schwabmünchen
6. Stadtbergen

Market towns

1. Biberbach
2. Diedorf
3. Dinkelscherben
4. Fischach
5. Meitingen
6. Thierhaupten
7. Zusmarshausen
Municipalities
1. Adelsried
2. Altenmünster
3. Aystetten
4. Gablingen
5. Graben
6. Horgau
7. Kutzenhausen
8. Langweid am Lech
9. Wehringen

Verwaltungsgemeinschaften
1. Gessertshausen; 1. Gessertshausen^{1}; 2. Ustersbach; 2. Großaitingen; 1. Großaitingen^{1}; 2. Kleinaitingen; 3. Oberottmarshausen	3. Langerringen; 1. Hiltenfingen; 2. Langerringen^{1}; 4. Lechfeld; 1. Klosterlechfeld; 2. Untermeitingen^{1}	5. Nordendorf; 1. Allmannshofen; 2. Ehingen; 3. Ellgau; 4. Kühlenthal; 5. Nordendorf^{1}; 6. Westendorf	6. Stauden; 1. Langenneufnach^{1}; 2. Mickhausen; 3. Mittelneufnach; 4. Scherstetten; 5. Walkertshofen	7. Welden; 1. Bonstetten; 2. Emersacker; 3. Heretsried; 4. Welden^{1,2}
^{1}seat of the Verwaltungsgemeinschaft; ^{2}Markt
