= Augsburg Western Woods Nature Park =

Nature park in Bavaria, Germany

Augsburg-Western Woods Nature Park
- Naturpark Augsburg-Westliche Wälder
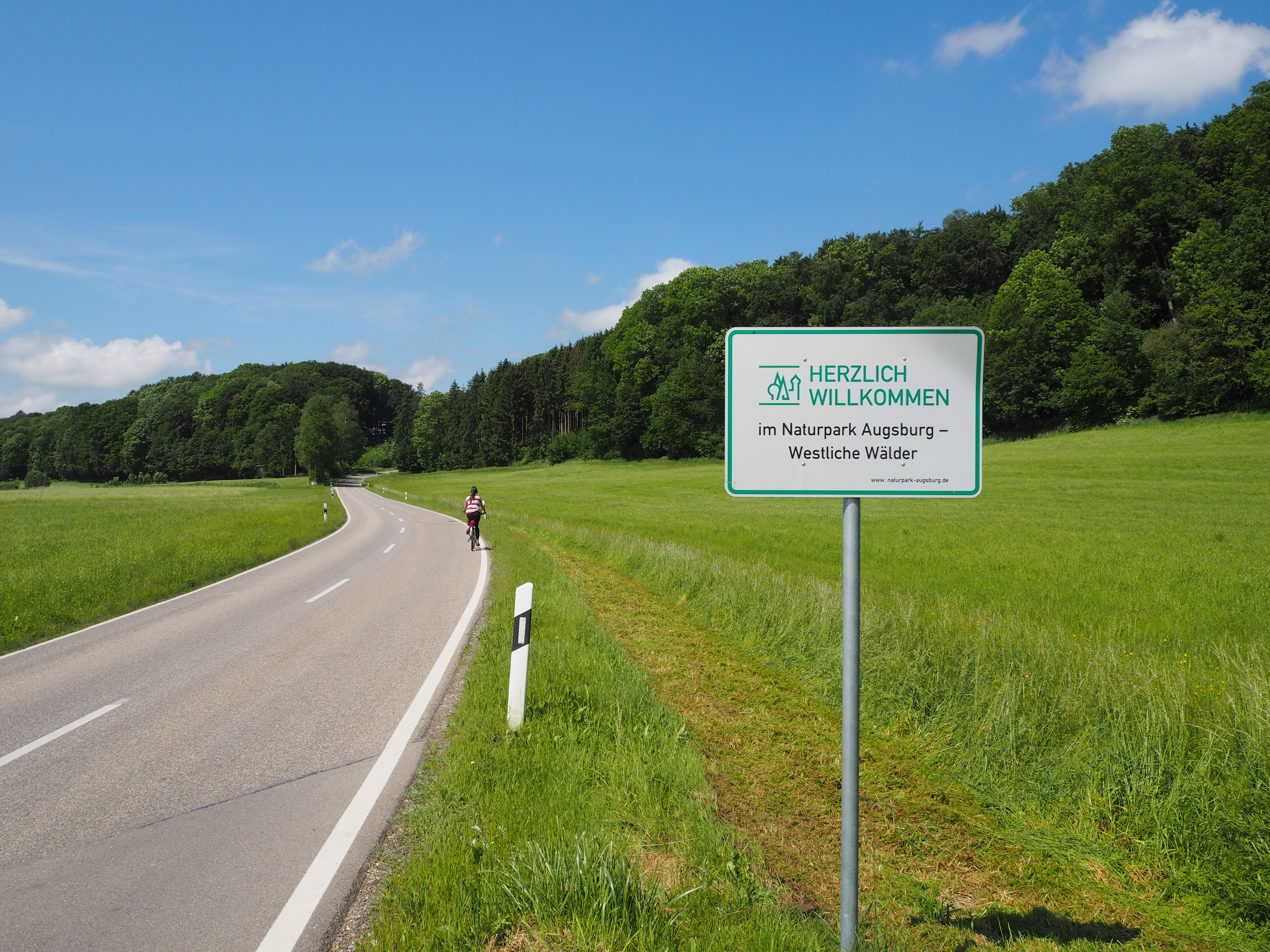

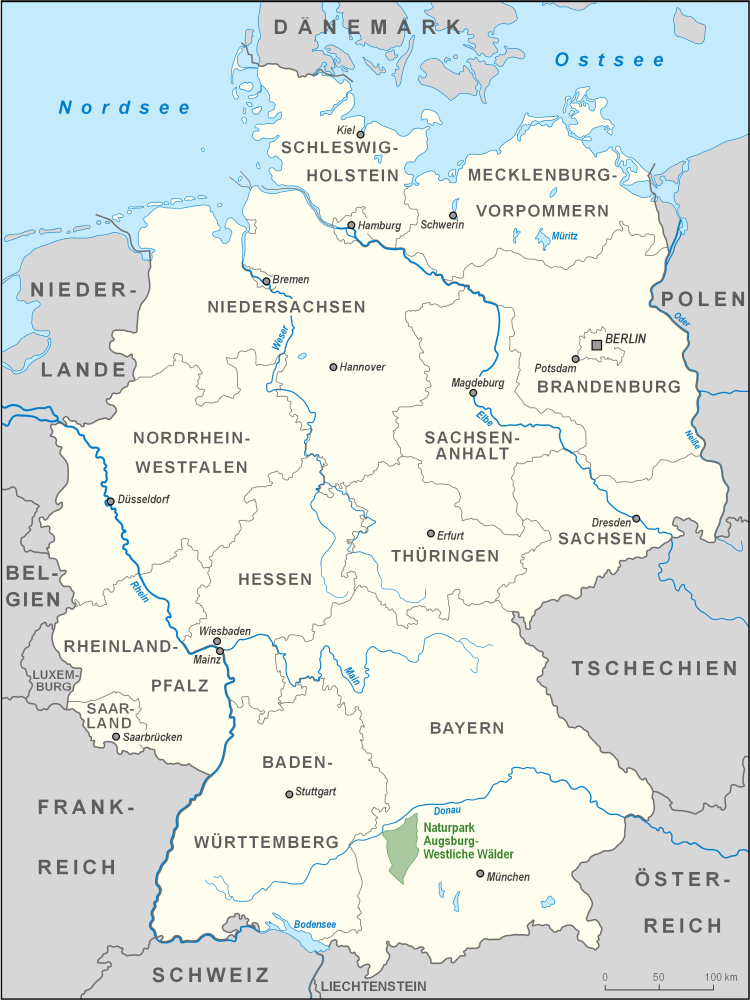
- Location of the nature park in Germany
- Location: Swabia, Bavaria, Germany
- Nearest city: Augsburg
- Coordinates: 48.397°N 10.672°E
- Area: 1,175 km^{2} (454 mi^{2})
- Established: 1988
- Website: www.naturpark-augsburg.de

The Augsburg-Western Woods Nature Park (German: Naturpark Augsburg-Westliche Wälder) is one of the two nature parks in Bavarian Swabia. The 1988 founded park has a size of 1,175 km^{2} (454 mi^{2}). The nature park is bordered by the rivers Danube, Wertach, Schmutter, Flossach and Mindel. The biggest part of it is located in Augsburg (district) and extends to the edge of the districts Unterallgäu, Günzburg (district) and Dillingen (district).

== Landscape ==
The gentle, hilly landscape is divided by the streams Schmutter, Neufnach and Zusam into gently undulating plateaus and flat interfluves. It is part of the Tertiary Hills between the Danube and the Bavarian Alpine Foreland. Nearly half (43%) of the region are forested and the proportion of grassland are high, too. The northern part around Welden is named Holzwinkel, the middle part around Dinkelscherben, Reischenau and the south part (south of the line Thannhausen-Ziemetshausen-Fischach-Gessertshausen-Stadtbergen) are the Stauden.

== Sights and attractions ==
=== Nature-Park-House near Oberschönenfeld Abbey ===
The Nature-Park-House, which was opened in the year 1992, is located in an adjoining building of Oberschönenfeld Abbey south of Gessertshausen. In the rooms of the Nature-Park-House the exhibition Nature and Men in the Nature-Park is shown. Furthermore there is near the Nature-Park-House the last thatched Staudenhaus, a little farm house in the type of construction which was typical in the Stauden. This house was rebuilt at this place between the years 1974 and 1980. In the stables, unused since 1972, the Bezirk Schwaben established the Swabian Folklore and Crafts Museum (Schwäbische Volkskundemuseum) in 1984.

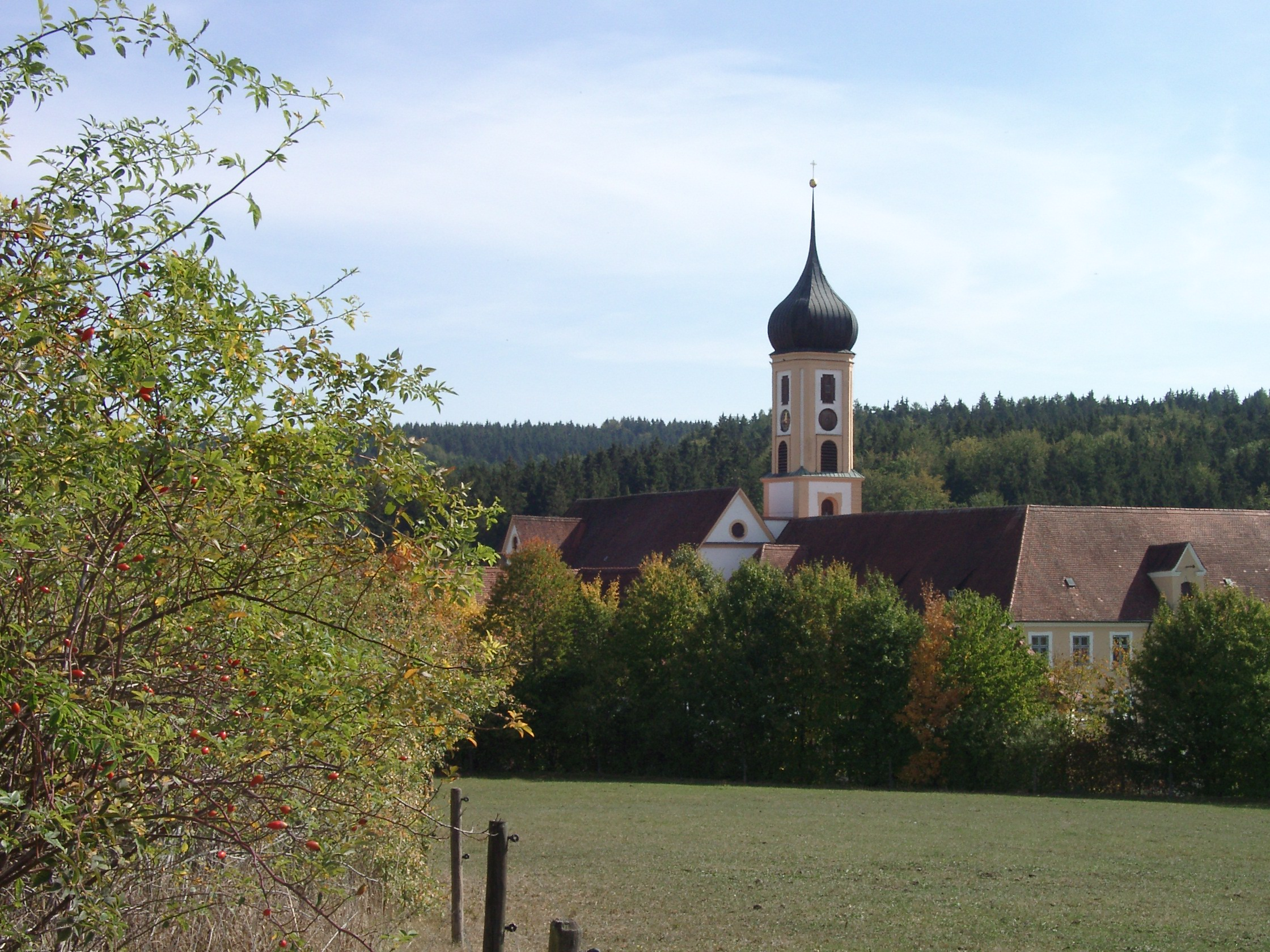
Oberschönenfeld Abbey

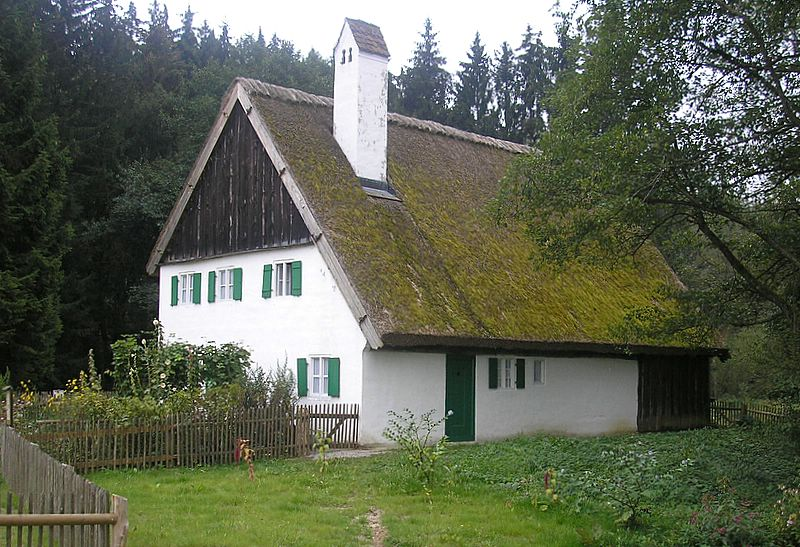
Staudenhaus

=== Further attractions and sights in the Augsburg-Westliche Wälder Nature Park ===
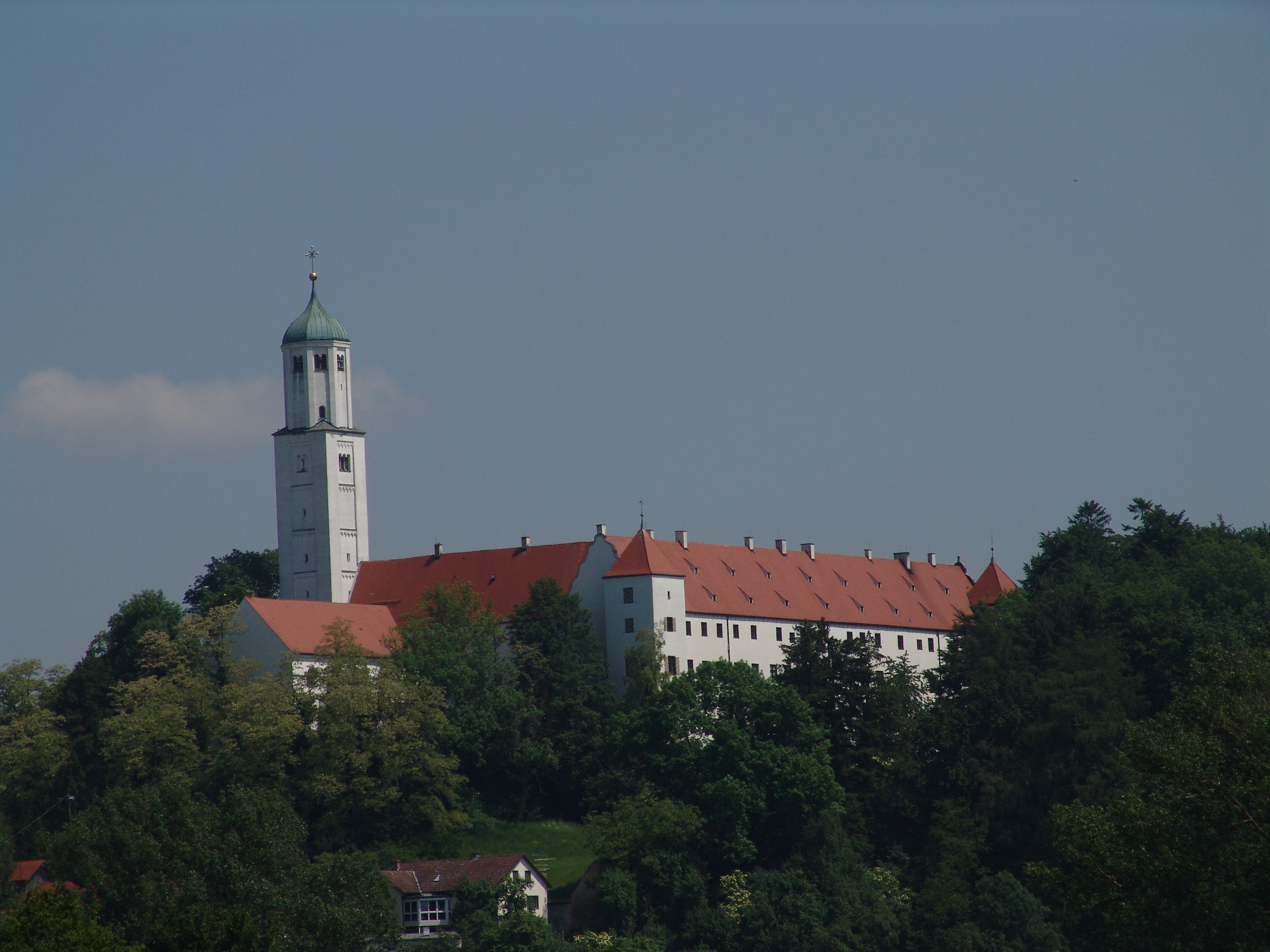
Fuggercastle Kirchheim

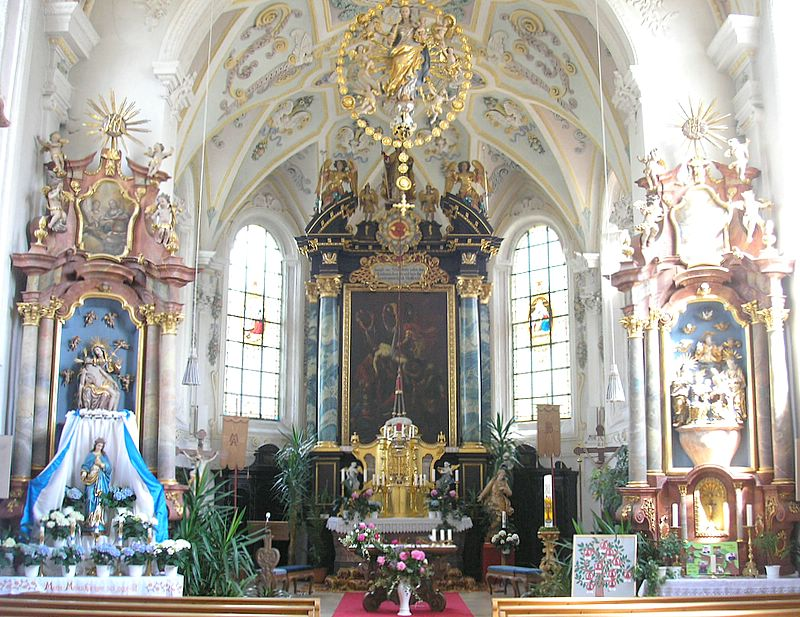
one of the many baroque- and rococo-churches in the "Swabian Pfaffenwinkel": church St. Wolfgang in Mickhausen

- people's observatory in Streitheim
- Nemetons and former castles, built in the Middle Ages (for example the Haldenburg near Schwabegg)
- Fuggercastle Kirchheim, from the 18th century, with the „Cedarhall“, one of the most beautiful renaissancehalls of Europe. The hall has a coffered ceiling with timber of Cedar from the Lebanon and 14 native kinds of wood, all in natura.
- pilgrimage church of St. Michael in Violau and observatory from the 18th century
- pilgrimage church of Maria Vesperbild near Ziemetshausen
- pilgrimage church in Biberbach
- pilgrimage church of Allerheiligen near Scheppach (municipality Jettingen-Scheppach)
- church of St. Thekla in Welden
- many little baroque- and rococo-churches in the "Swabian Pfaffenwinkel"

== Gallery ==
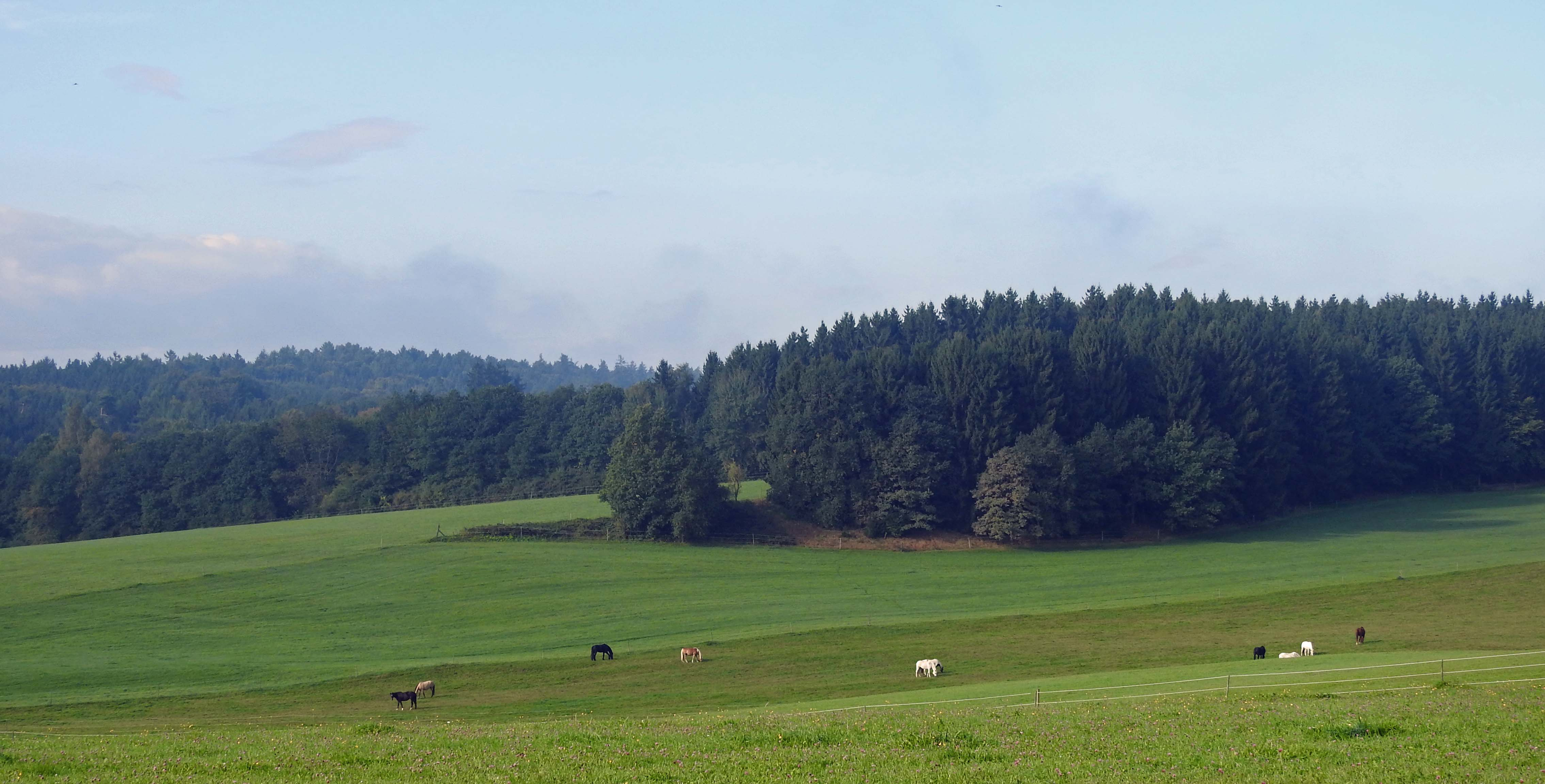

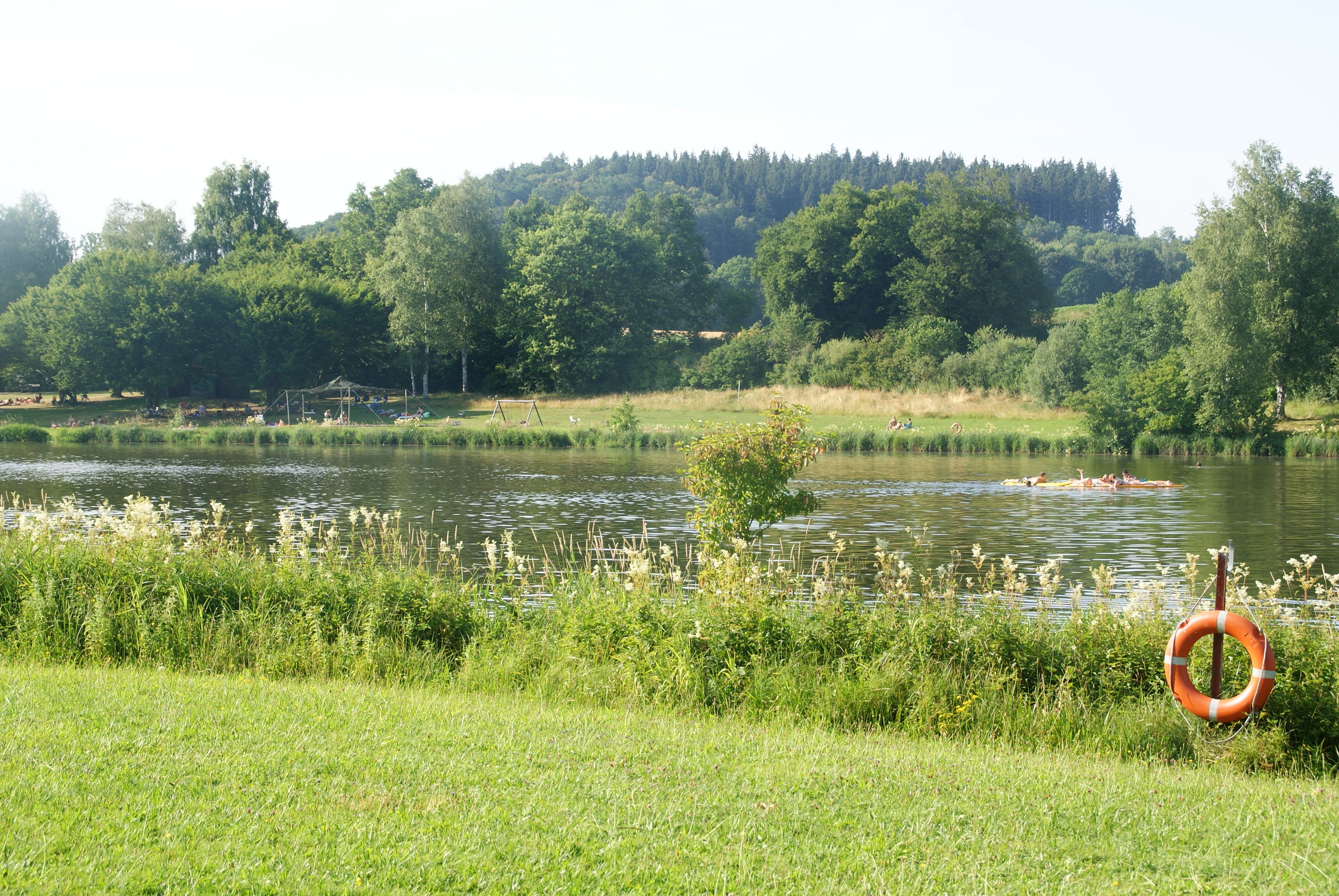
Rothsee

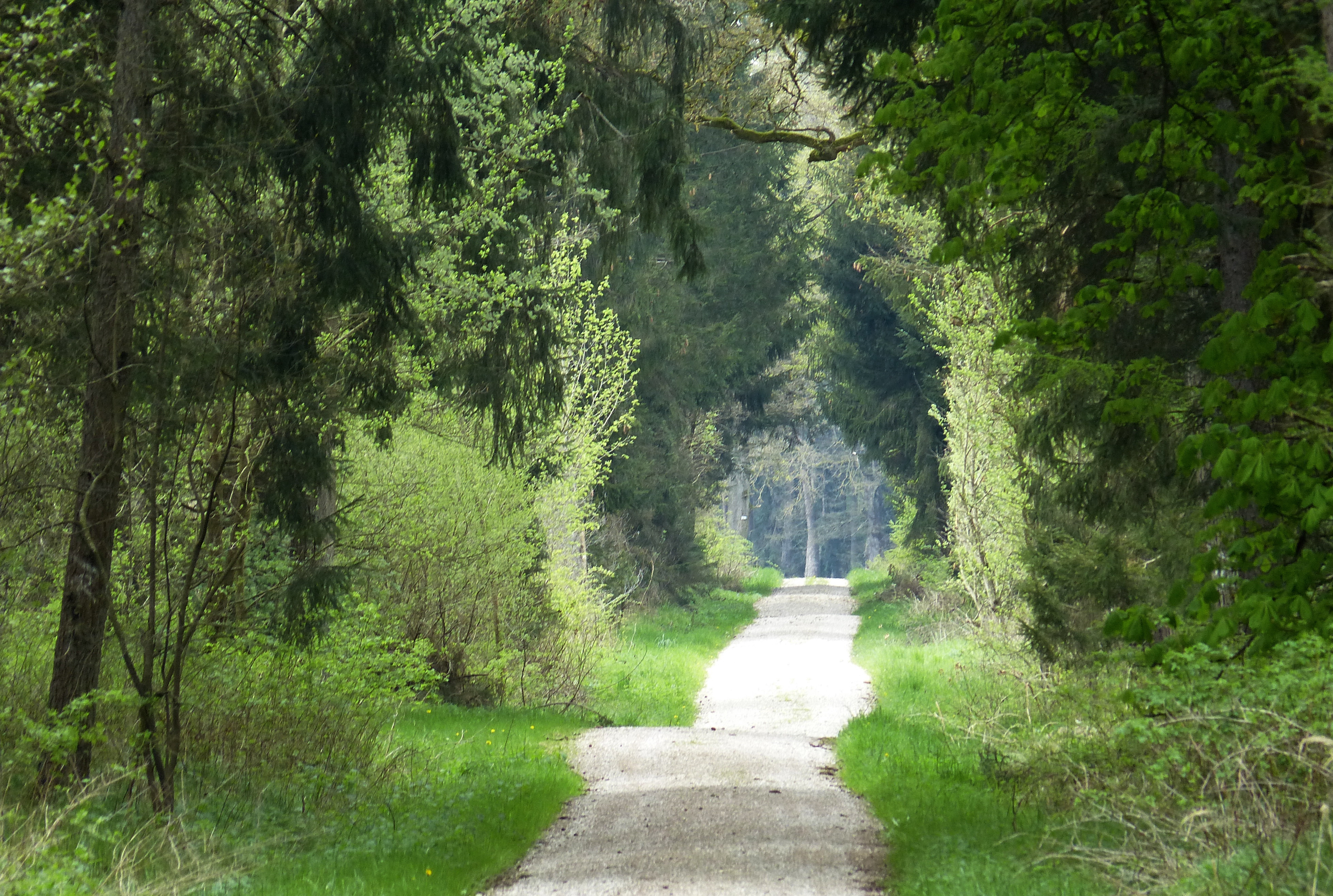

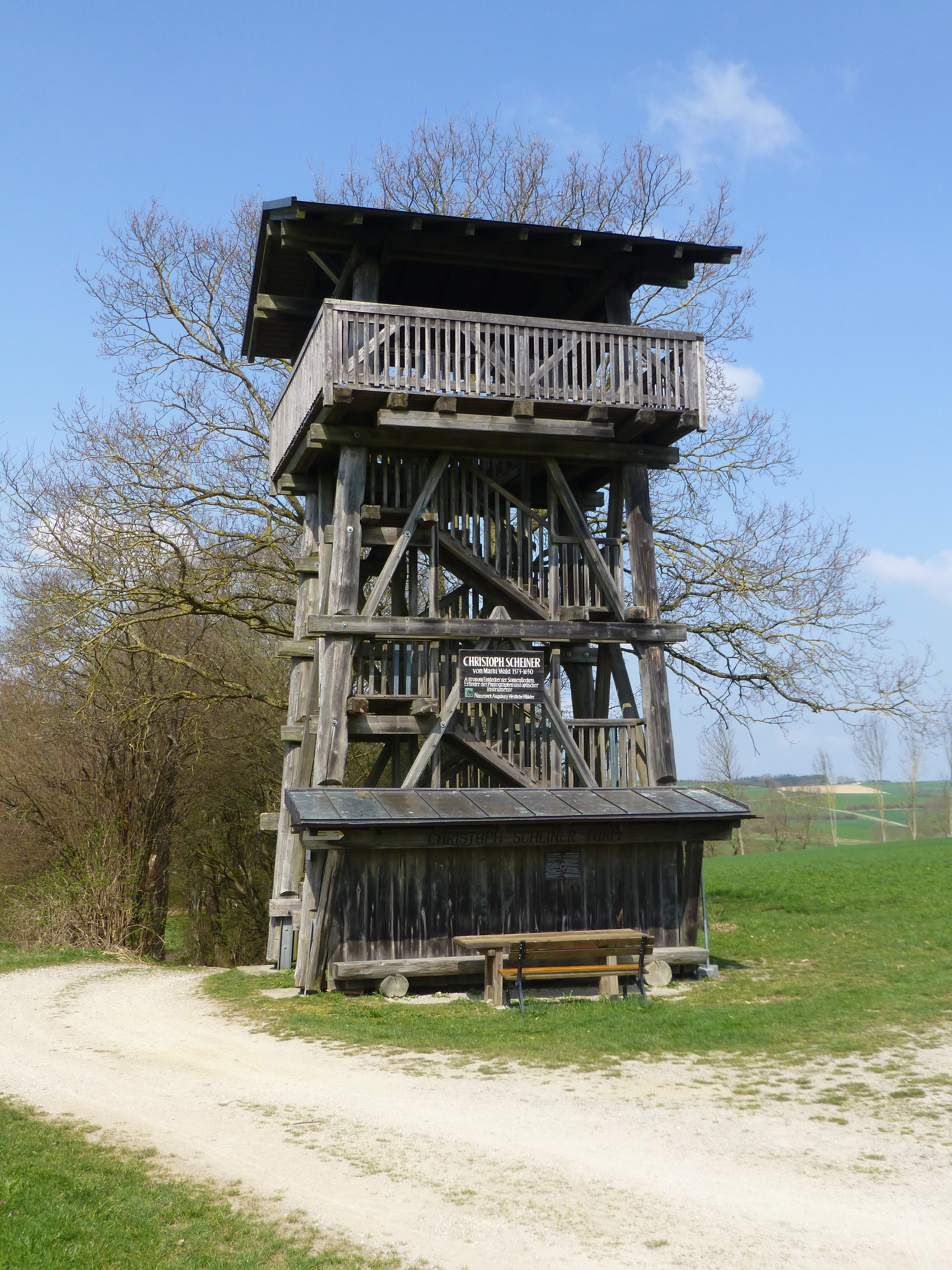

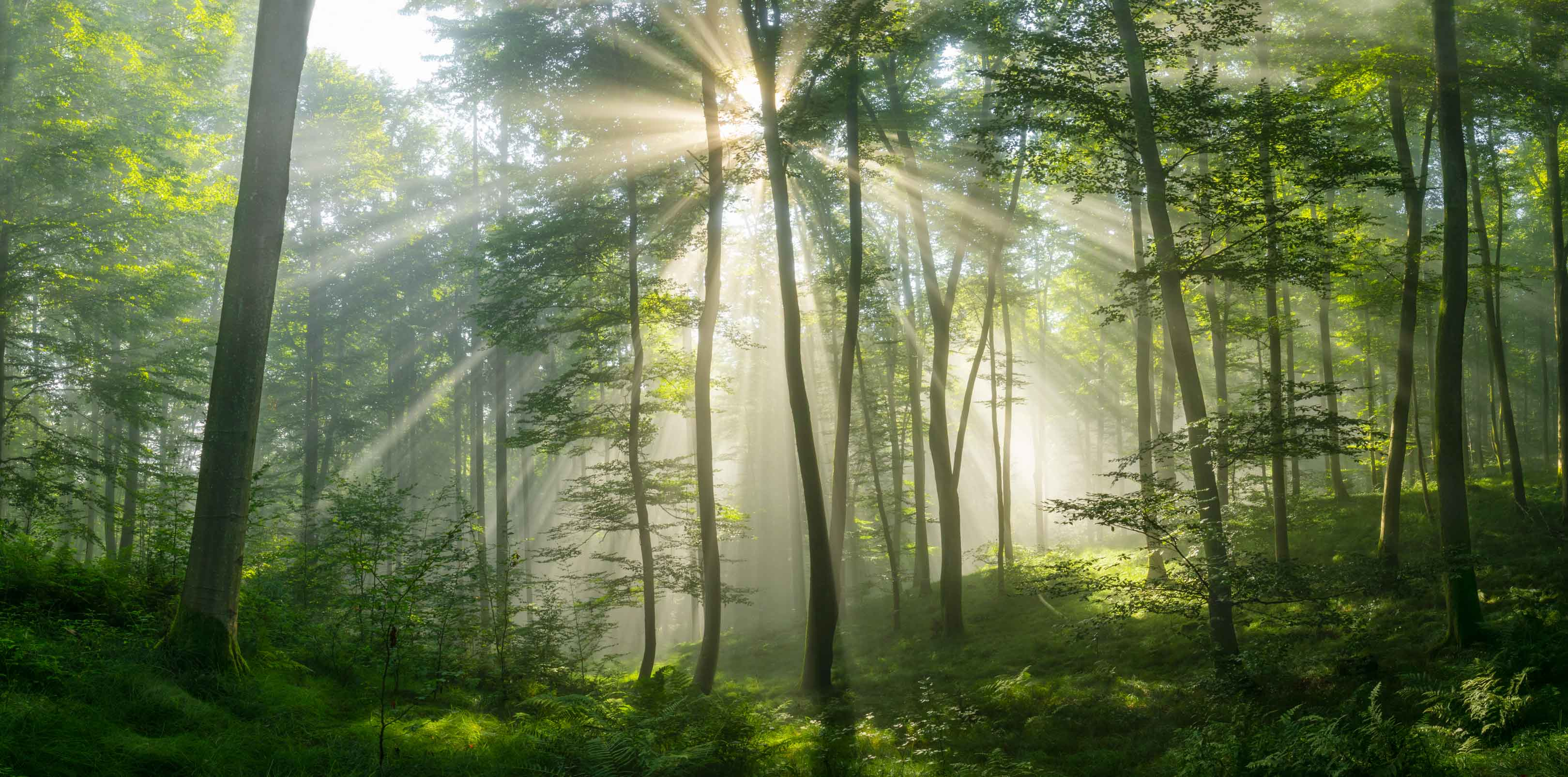

== See also ==
- List of nature parks in Germany
