= Flossach =

River in Germany

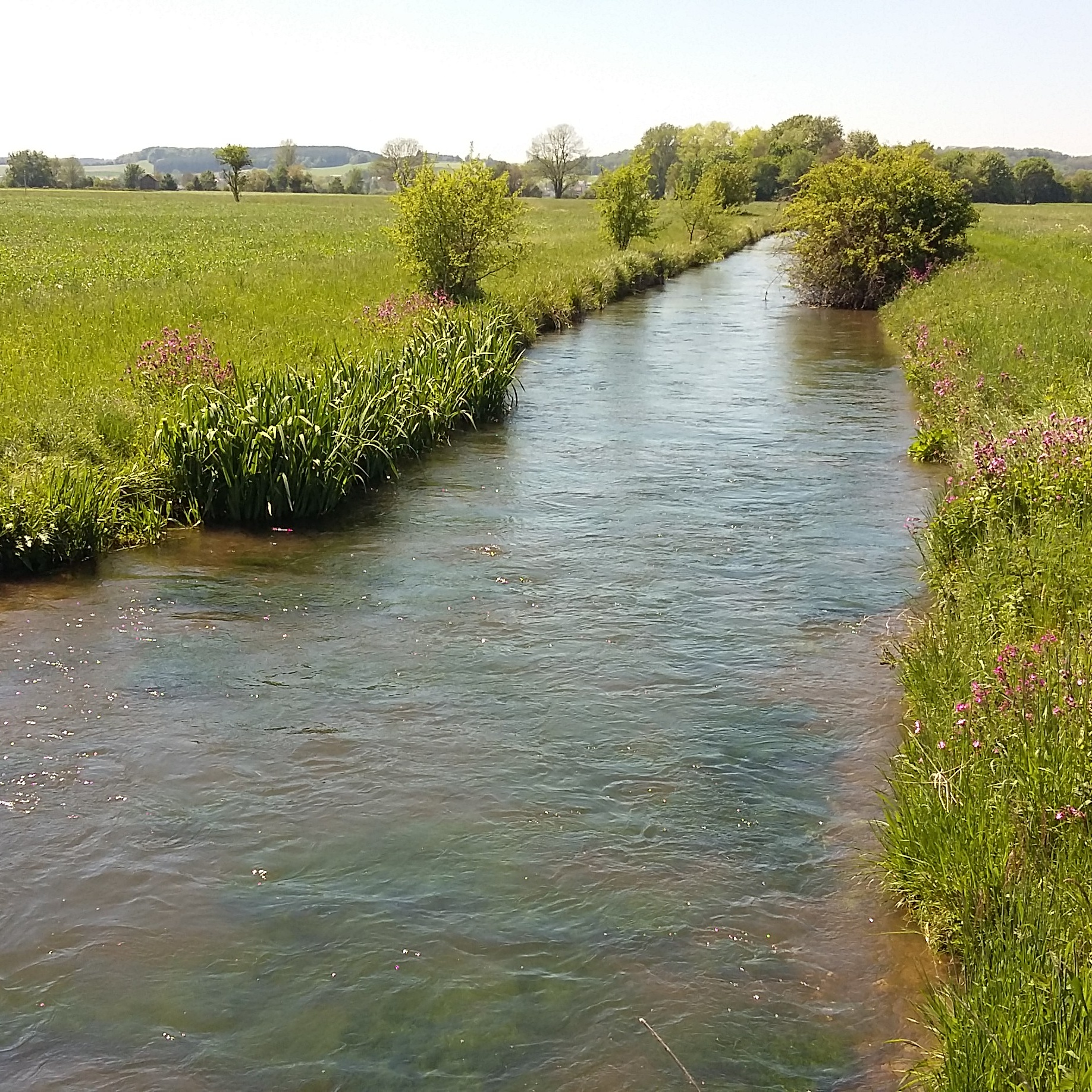
- The Flossach in the Mindel Valley, east of Hasberg, Kirchheim in Schwaben

Location
- Country: Germany
- State: Bavaria

Physical characteristics
- Source
  - location: northwest of Türkheim, east of Gerum (Rammingen)
  - coordinates: 48°4′40″N 10°36′19″E
  - elevation: 588 m (1,929 ft) above sea level
- Mouth
  - location: north of Hasberg in the Mindel
  - coordinates: 48°12′36″N 10°26′31″E
  - elevation: 522 m (1,713 ft) above sea level
- Length: 21.9 km (13.6 mi)

Basin features
- Progression: Mindel→ Danube→ Black Sea
- Tributaries
  - left: Wörthbach, Tiefenbach, Hierbach

Flossach is a 21.9-kilometre-long (13.6 mi) river in Bavaria, Germany. It is a right tributary of the Mindel and an indirect right tributary of the Danube.

== Geography ==
The Flossach rises near the village of Gerum, northwest of Türkheim at an elevation of 588 m (1,929 ft). It flows in a northwesterly direction through a broad valley, formed during the last glacial times. The 14.5 km (9.0 mi) long Weissbach flows parallel to the Flossach in the same valley. Approximately 900 m (3,000 ft) below the mouth of the brook Wörth, the Flossach divides into two branches. The main Flossach branch flows through the towns of Tussenhausen and Zaisertshofen; the other branch (called the Lettenbach or Lehnbachof) flows through Mattsiesmühle (north of Mattsies) and along the Mindelheim-Mattsies airfield. Just before joining the Mindel at an elevation of 522 m (1,713 ft), the Flossbach flows through the district of Günzburg and forms the border between Unterallgäu and Günzburg counties.

== Places in the Flossach Valley ==
- Gerum (Rammingen)
- Mattsies and Mattsiesmühle (Tussenhausen)
- Tussenhausen
- Zaisertshofen (Tussenhausen)

== Towns along the Flossach ==
- Salgen (located on the Eastern Mindel)
- Mörgen (Eppishausen)
- Bronnen (Salgen, located on the Eastern Mindel)
- Spöck (Kirchheim in Schwaben)
- Bronnerlehe (Salgen, located on the Eastern Mindel)
- Diepenhofen (Kirchheim in Schwaben)
- Kirchheim in Schwaben
- Dern (Kirchheim in Schwaben)
- Hasberg (Kirchheim in Schwaben, located on the Mindel)

== See also ==
- List of rivers of Bavaria
