= Neufnach =

River in Germany

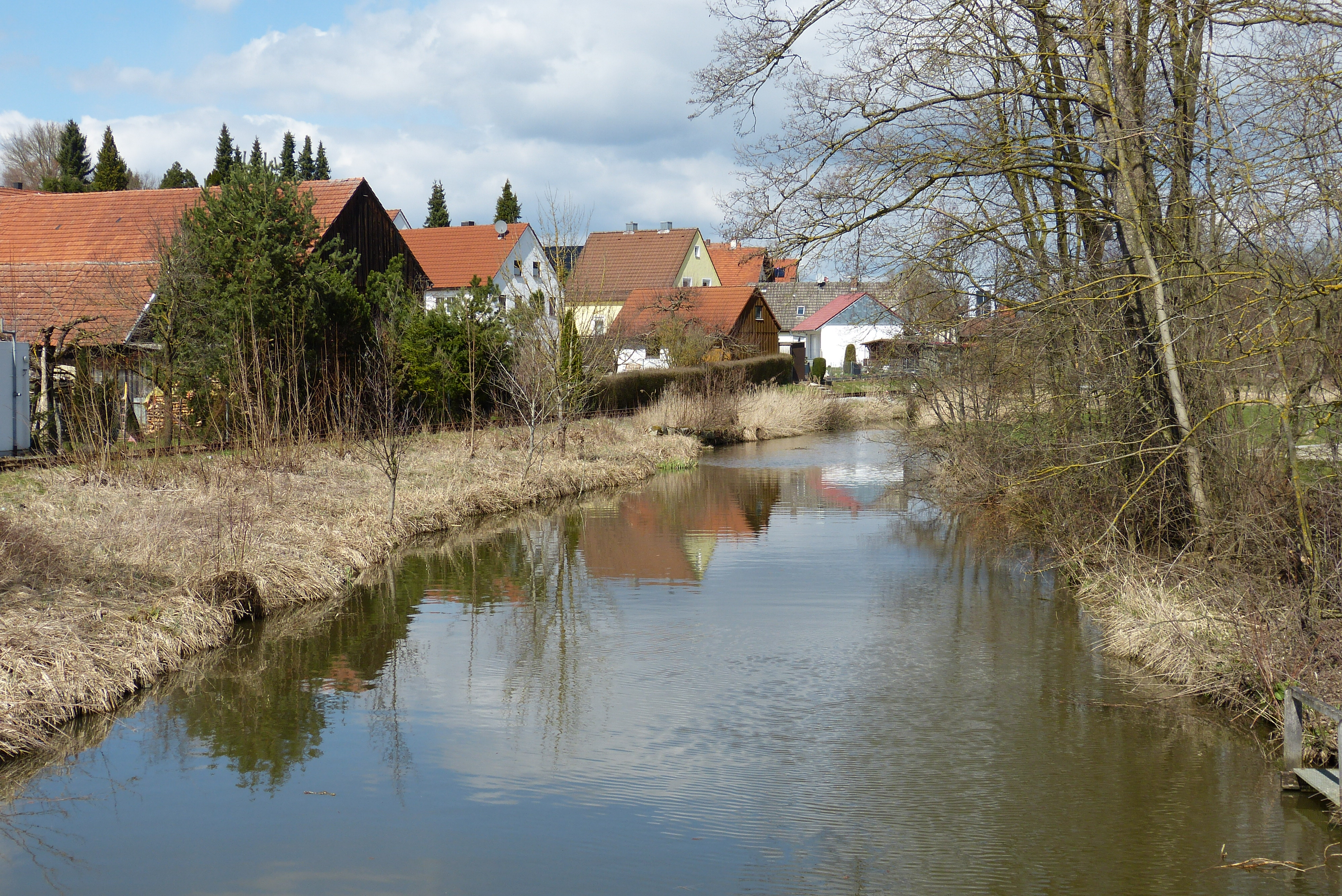
- The Neufnach at Langenneufnach, view toward the north

Location
- Country: Germany
- State: Bavaria

Physical characteristics
- Mouth
  - location: Schmutter
  - coordinates: 48.2907°N 10.6513°E
- Length: 30.0 km (18.6 mi)
- Basin size: 72 km^{2} (28 sq mi)

Basin features
- Progression: Schmutter→ Danube→ Black Sea

Neufnach is a river of Bavaria, Germany. It flows into the Schmutter in Fischach.

== See also ==
- List of rivers of Bavaria
