= Edenbergen =

- Ortsteil of Gersthofen
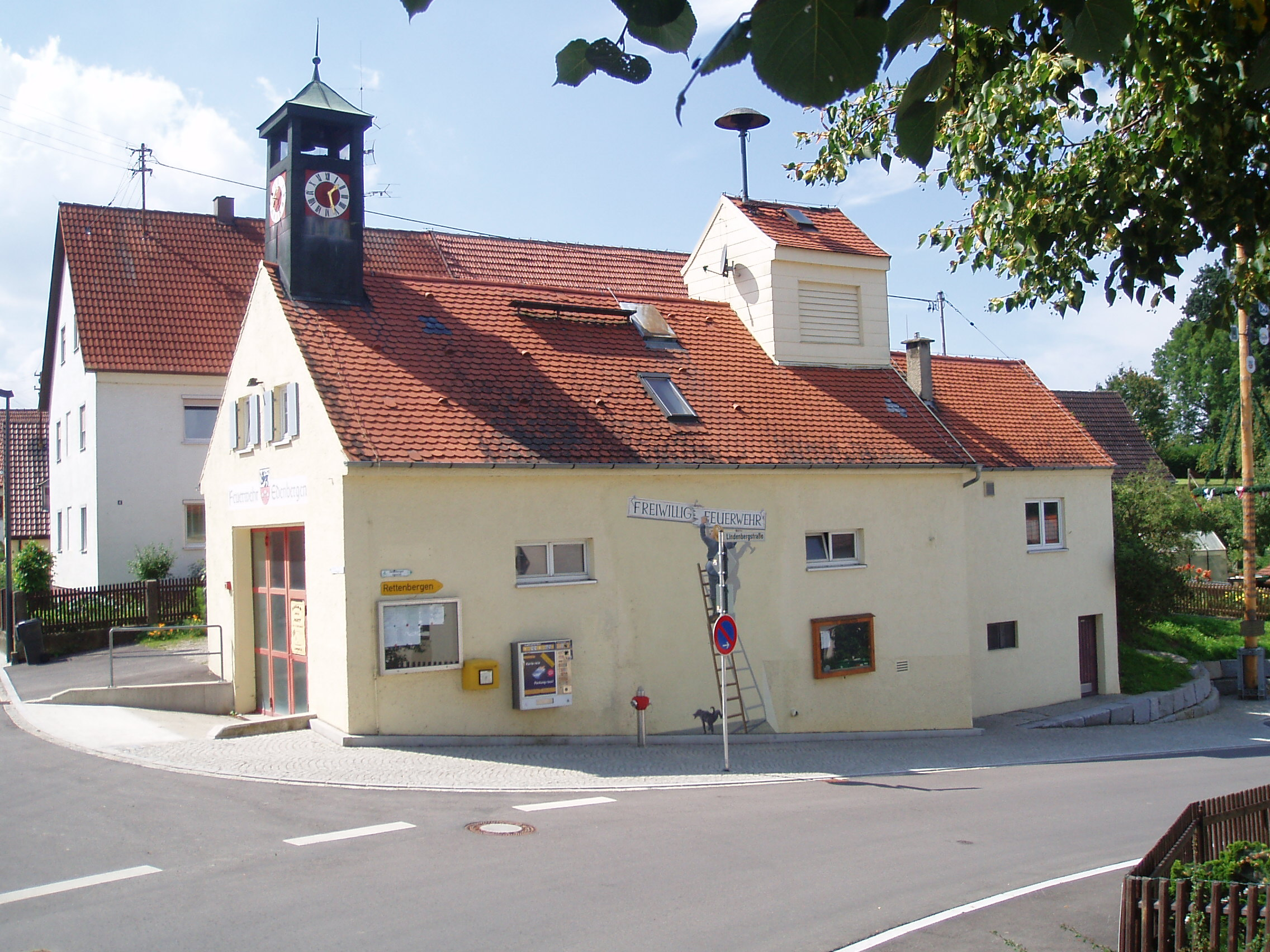

- Coat of arms
- Interactive map of Edenbergen
- Location within Germany Location within Bavaria
- Coordinates: 48°25′29″N 10°48′29″E
- Country: Germany
- State: Bavaria
- District: Augsburg
- Municipality: Gersthofen

Area
  - Total: 4.41 km^{2} (1.70 sq mi)
- Elevation: 476 m (1,562 ft)

Population (2021)
  - Total: 301
  - Density: 68.3/km^{2} (177/sq mi)
- Time zone: UTC+01:00 (CET)
  - Summer (DST): UTC+02:00 (CEST)
- Postal codes: 86368
- Dialling codes: 08230
- Vehicle registration: A

Edenbergen is a village and a former municipality in the district Augsburg in Bavaria, Germany. Since 1 January 1978, it is part of the municipality of Gersthofen. Edenbergen incorporates the hamlets of Gailenbach and Gailenbacher Mühle.

== Geography ==
Edenbergen is located at an altitude of 476 meters (1,562 feet) above sea level on a ridge between Böglebach to the north and Gailenbach to the south. These two creeks run through the village from the west to the east where they empty into the Schmutter river. The Gailenbacher Mühle (Gailenbach mill) lies on the banks of the Schmutter and belongs to Edenbergen as well as Gailenbach, a small hamlet in the southeast of Edenbergen.

== Demographics ==
=== Population ===
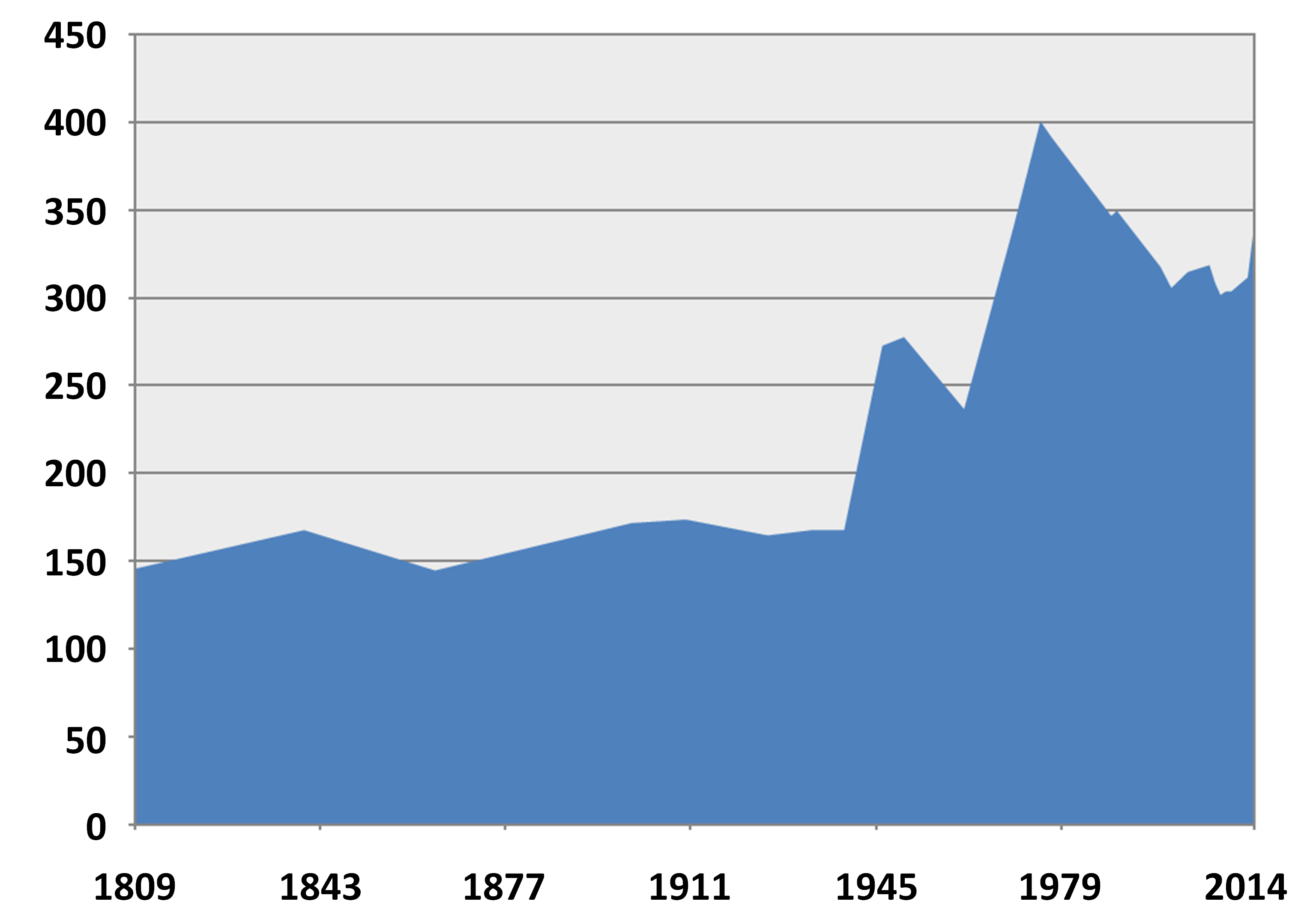
Historical population of Edenbergen

Edenbergen is the smallest village of the municipality of Gersthofen and amounts only to about 1.5 percent of the town's total population. On 1 July 2009, 304 people lived in Edenbergen, 148 females and 156 males. This corresponds to a proportion of women of 48.7 percent. At that time, the population density of Edenbergen was 69 inhabitants per square kilometer (180 inhabitants per square mile).

| Year | Population |
|---|---|
| 1809 | 146 |
| 1840 | 168 |
| 1864 | 145 |
| 1900 | 172 |
| 1910 | 174 |
| 1925 | 165 |

| Year | Population |
|---|---|
| 1933 | 168 |
| 1939 | 168 |
| 1946 | 273 |
| 1950 | 278 |
| 1961 | 237 |
| 1970 | 340 |

| Year | Population |
|---|---|
| 1975 | 401 |
| 1977 | 392 |
| 1987 | 351 |
| 1988 | 347 |
| 1989 | 350 |
| 1997 | 318 |

| Year | Population |
|---|---|
| 1999 | 306 |
| 2002 | 315 |
| 2005 | 318 |
| 2006 | 319 |
| 2007 | 309 |
| 2008 | 302 |

| Year | Population |
|---|---|
| 2009 | 304 |
| 2010 | 304 |
| 2013 | 312 |

=== Religion ===
Roman Catholics comprise most of the population in Edenbergen and belong to the parish of Batzenhofen, a village half a mile east of Edenbergen and part of the Diocese of Augsburg. There is no church building in Edenbergen, but three chapels dedicated to the Blessed Virgin Mary.

== Coats of arms ==
Coats of arms of Edenbergen

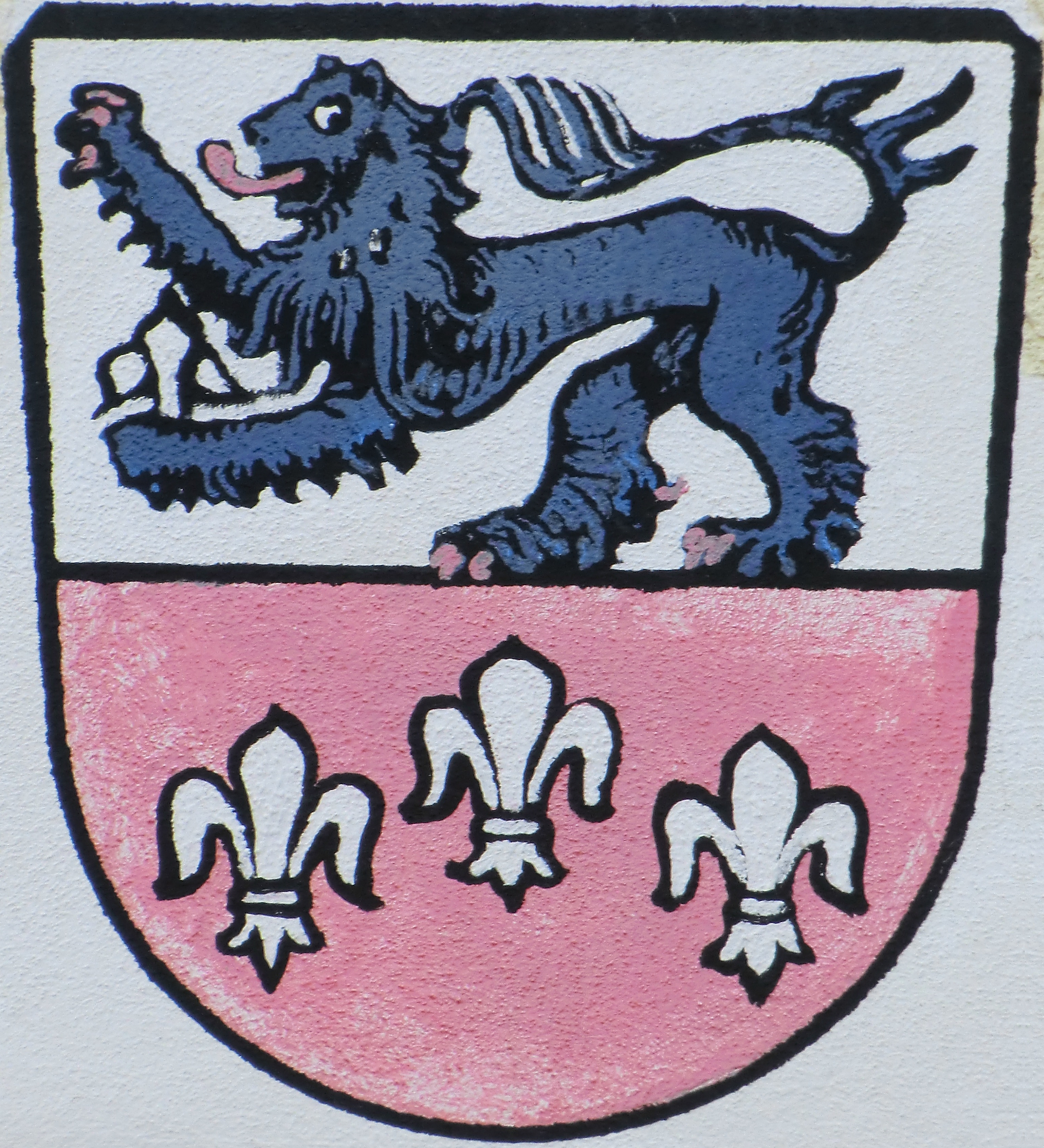
Coats of arms of Edenbergen at the local fire station

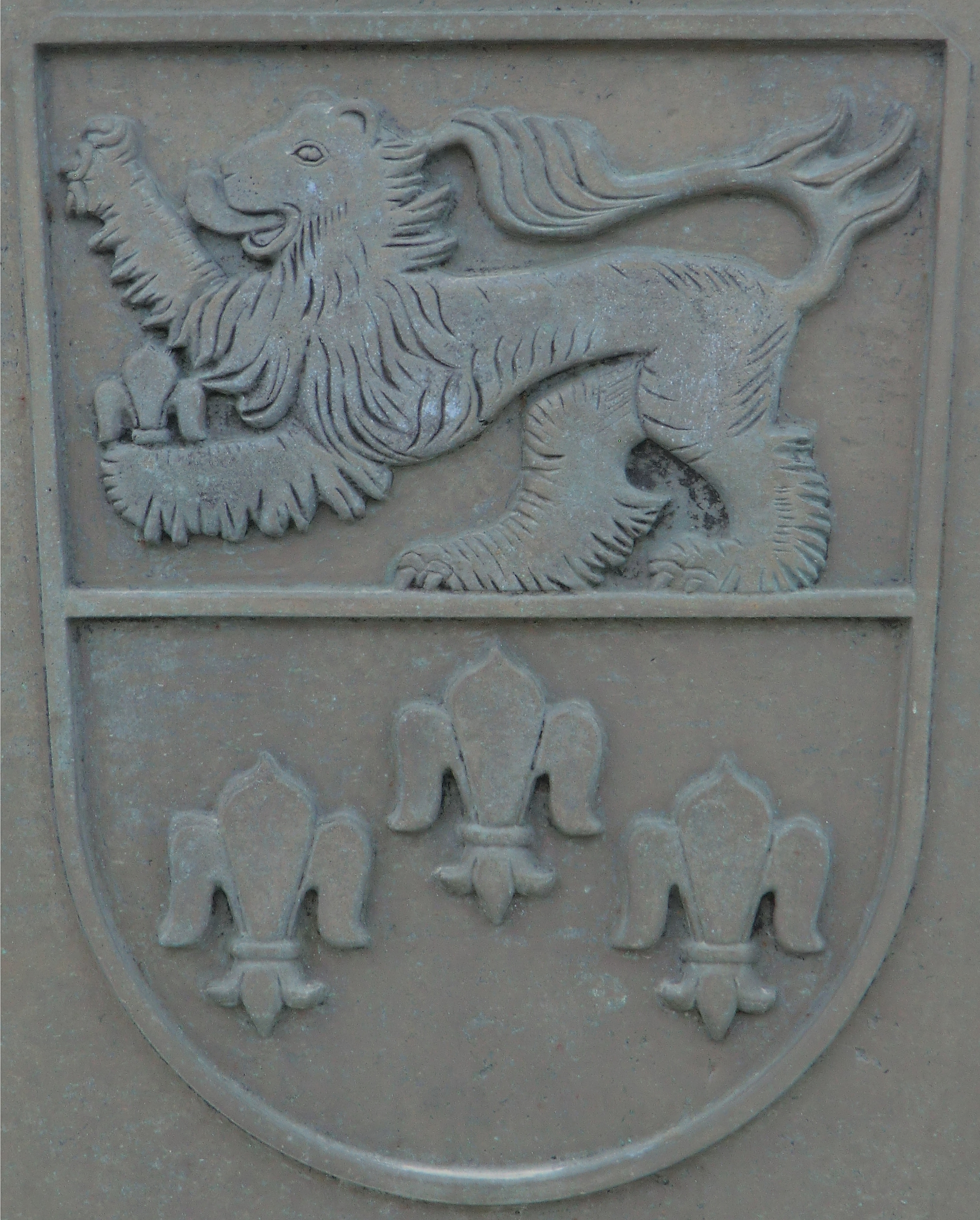
Coats of arms of Edenbergen at a bridge railing

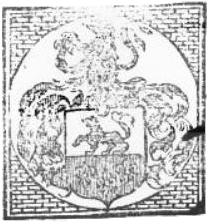
Coats of arms of Paris family
