= Wörthbach =

River in Germany

- The Wörthbach in Bad Wörishofen

Location
- Country: Germany
- State: Bavaria

Physical characteristics
- Mouth
  - location: Flossach
  - coordinates: 48.0838°N 10.5815°E
- Length: 34.5 km (21.4 mi)
- Basin size: 134 km^{2} (52 sq mi)

Basin features
- Progression: Flossach→ Mindel→ Danube→ Black Sea

Wörthbach is a river of Bavaria, Germany. It flows into the Flossach near Rammingen.

== See also ==
- List of rivers of Bavaria
