= Wiedergeltingen =

- Municipality
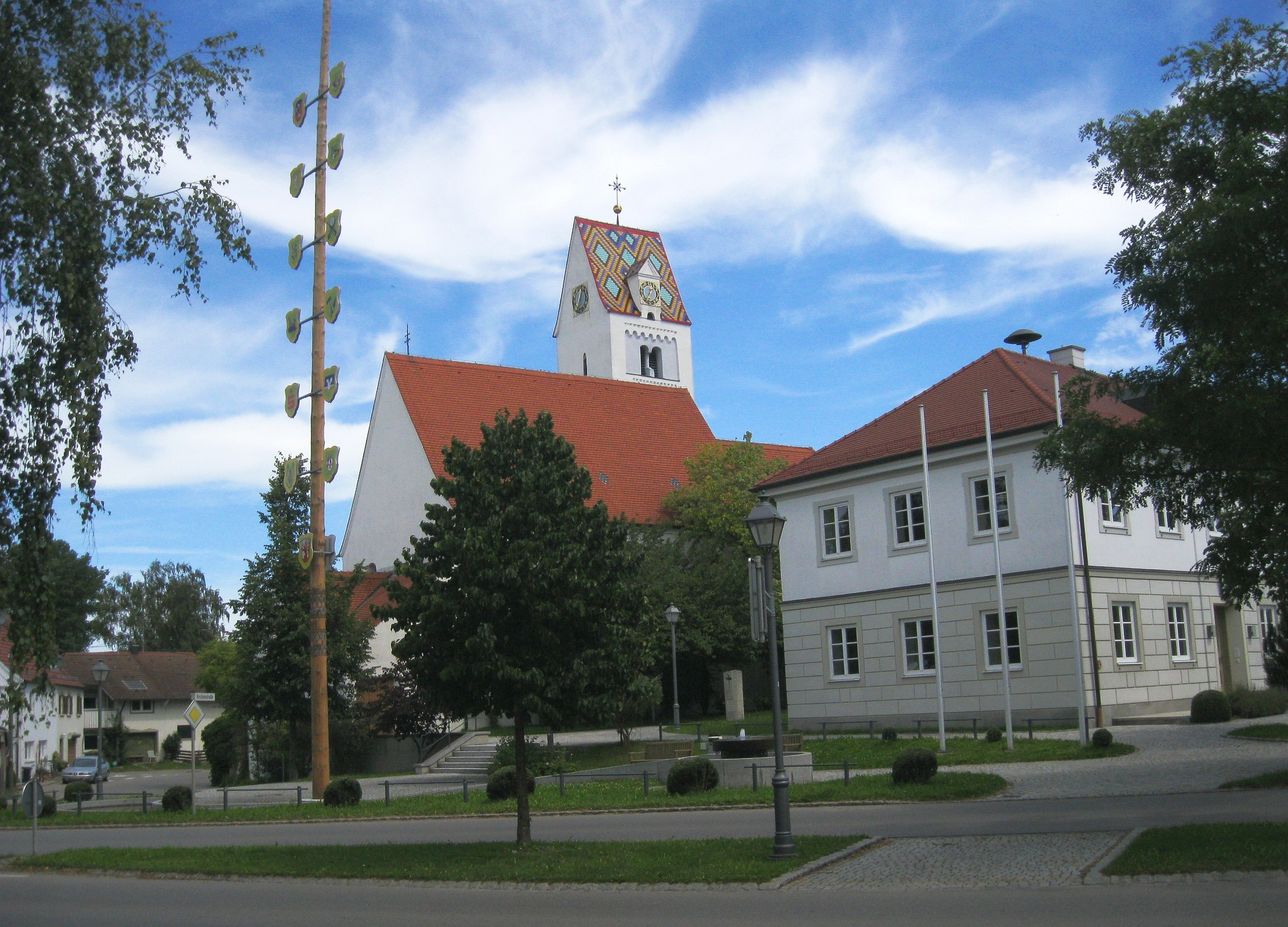
- Church and town hall in Wiedergeltingen

- Coat of arms

- Location of Wiedergeltingen within Unterallgäu district
- Interactive map of Wiedergeltingen
- Location within Germany Location within Bavaria
- Coordinates: 48°01′N 10°40′E
- Country: Germany
- State: Bavaria
- Admin. region: Schwaben
- District: Unterallgäu
- Municipal assoc.: Türkheim

Government
  - Mayor (2020–26): Norbert Führer

Area
  - Total: 11.61 km^{2} (4.48 sq mi)
- Elevation: 609 m (1,998 ft)

Population (2025-12-31)
  - Total: 1,472
  - Density: 126.8/km^{2} (328.4/sq mi)
- Time zone: UTC+01:00 (CET)
  - Summer (DST): UTC+02:00 (CEST)
- Postal codes: 86879
- Dialling codes: 08241
- Vehicle registration: MN
- Website: www.wiedergeltingen.de

Wiedergeltingen is a municipality in the district of Unterallgäu in Bavaria, Germany. The town has a municipal association with Türkheim.
