= Scherstetten =

- Municipality
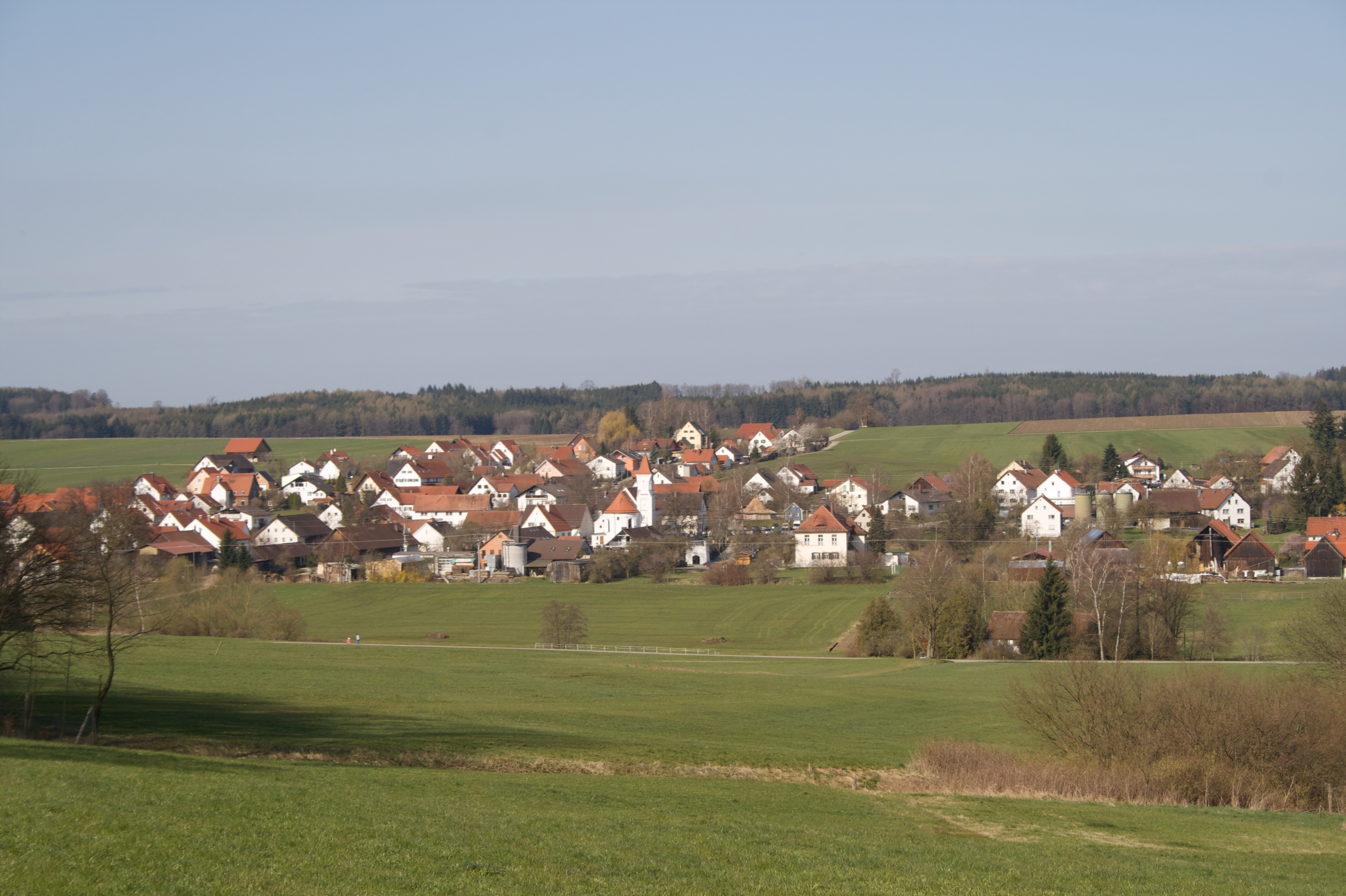
- General view of the village

- Coat of arms

- Location of Scherstetten within Augsburg district
- Interactive map of Scherstetten
- Location within Germany Location within Bavaria
- Coordinates: 48°11′N 10°38′E
- Country: Germany
- State: Bavaria
- Admin. region: Schwaben
- District: Augsburg
- Municipal assoc.: Stauden

Government
  - Mayor (2020–26): Robert Wippel

Area
  - Total: 15.69 km^{2} (6.06 sq mi)
- Elevation: 550 m (1,800 ft)

Population (2025-12-31)
  - Total: 1,103
  - Density: 70.30/km^{2} (182.1/sq mi)
- Time zone: UTC+01:00 (CET)
  - Summer (DST): UTC+02:00 (CEST)
- Postal codes: 86872
- Dialling codes: 08262
- Vehicle registration: A

Scherstetten is a municipality in the district of Augsburg in Bavaria in Germany.
