= Oberschönenfeld Abbey =

Coordinates: 48°18′44″N 10°43′38″E

Oberschönenfeld Abbey (Kloster Oberschönenfeld) is a Cistercian nunnery in Gessertshausen in Bavaria, Germany.

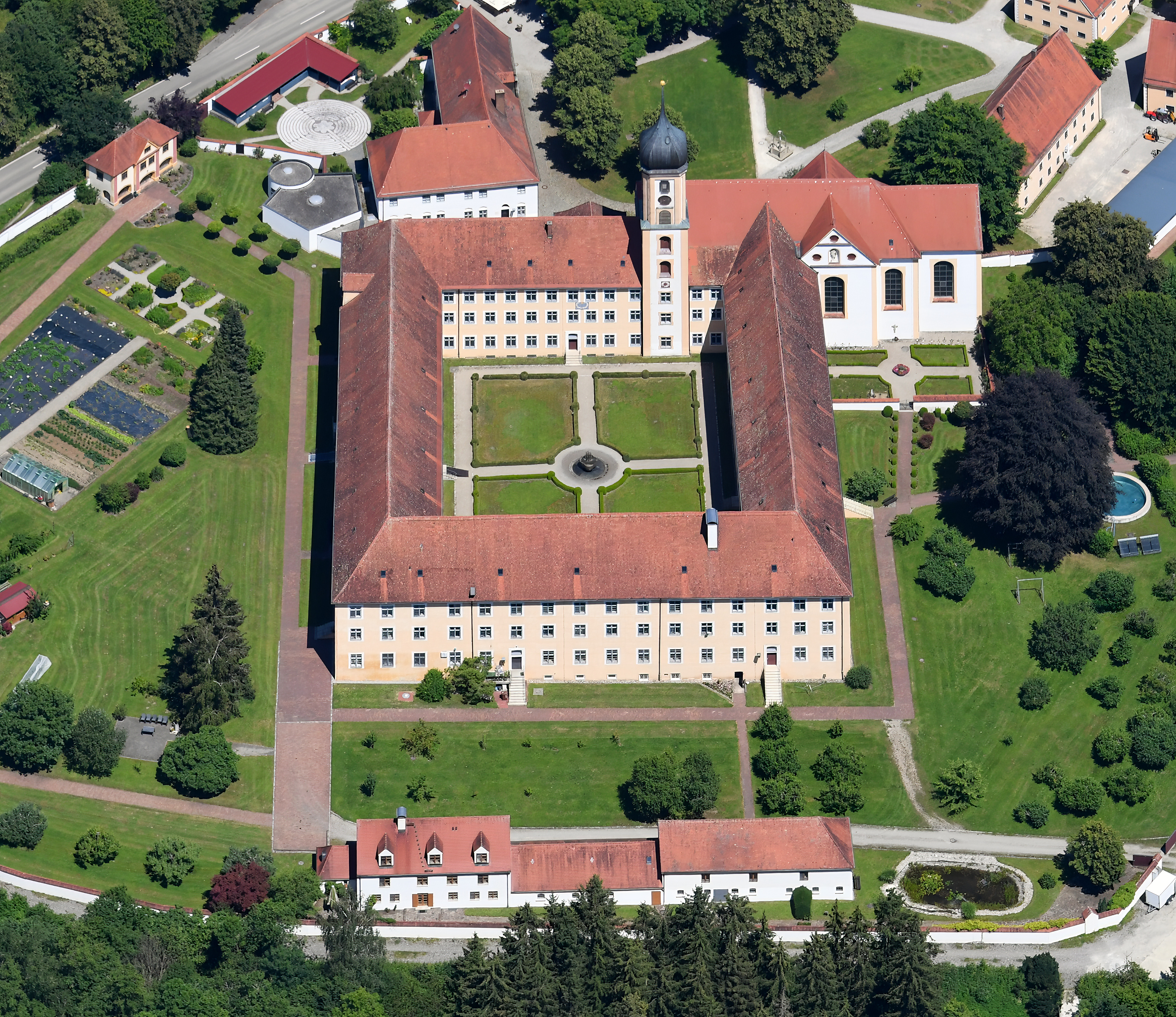
Aerial view of the Cistercian nunnery of Oberschönenfeld

== History ==
As early as around 1186 there were Beguines, or a similar community of women, on this site. In about 1211 they formed a more structured community which by 1248, when the church was dedicated to the Virgin Mary, had been formally constituted as a Cistercian nunnery, accounted a daughter house of Kaisheim Abbey; its founders were the local nobleman Volkmar von Kemnat and Hartmann von Dillingen, Bishop of Augsburg, of the family of the Counts of Dillingen.

Between 1718 and 1721 the monastic buildings were reconstructed in their present Baroque form by the master builder Franz Beer, as was the church later.

Until 1803 the abbey exercised territorial lordship over the villages of Gessertshausen and Altenmünster.

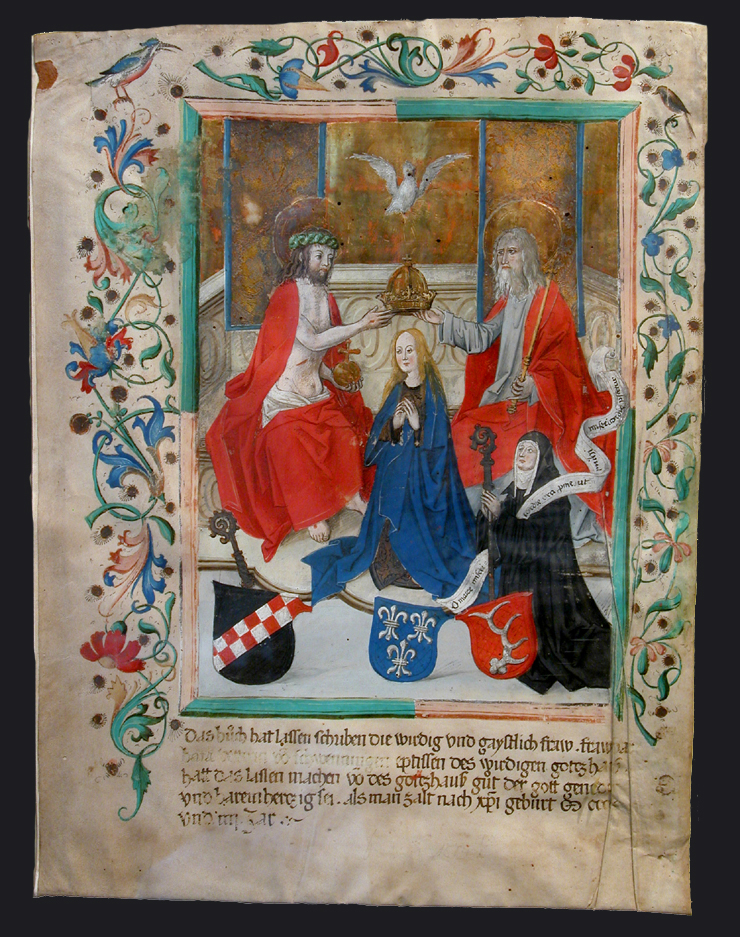
Miniature with Abbess Barbara Vetter, 1504

In 1803 the abbey was dissolved in the course of the secularisation of Bavaria. The nuns were not expelled, however, and the nunnery was reopened in 1836 by King Ludwig I of Bavaria as a priory, which was made an abbey again in 1918.

In 1951 the first missionaries were sent to Brazil, where in 1963 they founded their own monastery in Itararé in the state of São Paulo.

== Museums ==
In the stables, unused since 1972, the Bezirk Schwaben established the Swabian Folklore and Crafts Museum (Schwäbisches Volkskundemuseum Oberschönenfeld; since 2018: Museum Oberschönenfeld) in 1984. In 2003 the Swabian Gallery (for revolving exhibitions of art) was added.

Here are also the nature reserve house of the Augsburg-Western Woods Nature Reserve (Naturpark Augsburg-Westliche Wälder).

== Sources ==
- (in German) Oberschönenfeld Abbey official website
- (in German) Klöster in Bayern: Oberschönenfeld
