= Amberg, Swabia =

Amberg
- Municipality
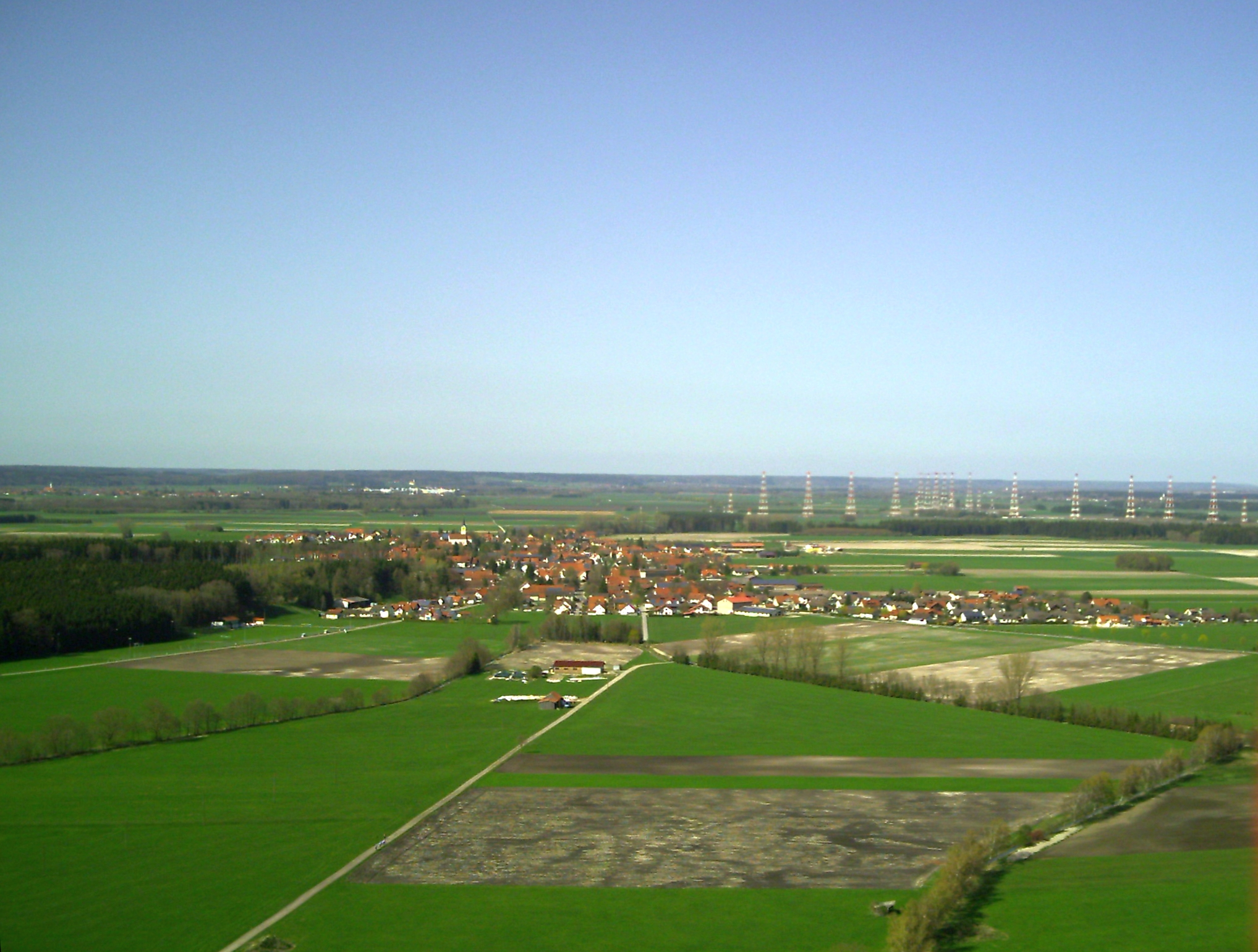
- Amberg

- Coat of arms

- Location of Amberg within Unterallgäu district
- Interactive map of Amberg
- Location within Germany Location within Bavaria
- Coordinates: 48°4′N 10°41′E
- Country: Germany
- State: Bavaria
- Admin. region: Schwaben
- District: Unterallgäu
- Municipal assoc.: Türkheim

Government
  - Mayor (2020–26): Peter Kneipp (FW)

Area
  - Total: 10.96 km^{2} (4.23 sq mi)
- Elevation: 608 m (1,995 ft)

Population (2025-12-31)
  - Total: 1,552
  - Density: 141.6/km^{2} (366.8/sq mi)
- Time zone: UTC+01:00 (CET)
  - Summer (DST): UTC+02:00 (CEST)
- Postal codes: 86854
- Dialling codes: 08241
- Vehicle registration: MN
- Website: www.gemeinde-amberg.de

Amberg (German pronunciation: [ˈambɛʁk]) is a municipality in the district of Unterallgäu in Bavaria, Germany. The town has a municipal association with Türkheim.
