= Walkertshofen =

- Municipality
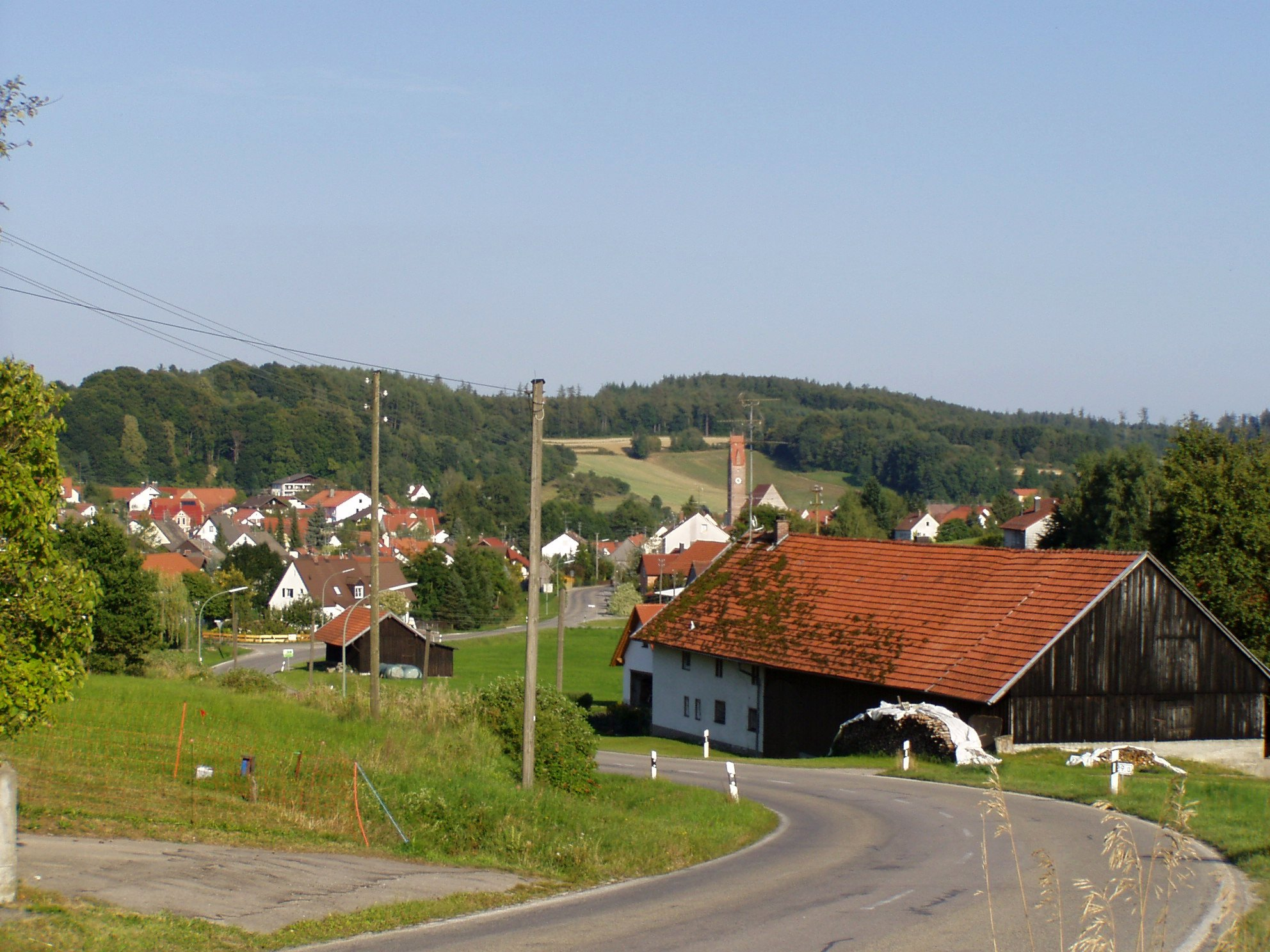
- Walkertshofen seen from the west

- Coat of arms

- Location of Walkertshofen within Augsburg district
- Interactive map of Walkertshofen
- Location within Germany Location within Bavaria
- Coordinates: 48°14′N 10°35′E
- Country: Germany
- State: Bavaria
- Admin. region: Schwaben
- District: Augsburg
- Municipal assoc.: Stauden

Government
  - Mayor (2020–26): Margit Jungwirth-Karl (CSU)

Area
  - Total: 12.68 km^{2} (4.90 sq mi)
- Elevation: 535 m (1,755 ft)

Population (2025-12-31)
  - Total: 1,175
  - Density: 92.67/km^{2} (240.0/sq mi)
- Time zone: UTC+01:00 (CET)
  - Summer (DST): UTC+02:00 (CEST)
- Postal codes: 86877
- Dialling codes: 08239
- Vehicle registration: A
- Website: www.walkertshofen.de

Walkertshofen is a municipality in the district of Augsburg in Bavaria in Germany. It is set amongst gentle rolling hills of the farm district of Bavaria that are occasionally covered in snow during the winter months. Its only source of retail is one public hotel for food and refreshments. The majority of the population in the past have been mainly engaged in the workings of the surrounding farms with a small portion working on the building of the autobahns (main highways).

Within the centre of the town is a monument dedicated to those who lived within the town and lost their lives as a result of the European conflicts.

The current population of Walkertshofen is 1,100, who are primarily Roman Catholics.{{cn}date=April 2020}}
