= Türkheim (Verwaltungsgemeinschaft) =

- Verwaltungsgemeinschaft
- Location of Türkheim within Unterallgäu district
- Interactive map of Türkheim
- Location within Germany Location within Bavaria
- Coordinates: 48°04′N 10°38′E
- Country: Germany
- State: Bavaria
- Admin. region: Swabia
- District: Unterallgäu
- Seat: Türkheim
- Subdivisions: 4 municipalities

Area
  - Total: 73.38 km^{2} (28.33 sq mi)

Population (2025-12-31)
  - Total: 12,054
  - Density: 164.3/km^{2} (425.5/sq mi)
- Time zone: UTC+01:00 (CET)
  - Summer (DST): UTC+02:00 (CEST)
- Website: www.tuerkheim.de

Türkheim is a Verwaltungsgemeinschaft (municipal association) in the district of Unterallgäu in Bavaria, Germany. Its seat is in Türkheim. It consists of the following municipalities:

1. Amberg
2. Rammingen
3. Türkheim
4. Wiedergeltingen
