= Joseph-Bernhart-Gymnasium =

Coordinates: 48.0503°N 10.6392°E

The Joseph-Bernhart-Gymnasium (JBG) is a Gymnasium in Türkheim, Bavaria, which is named after Joseph Bernhart (1881–1969).
