= Gablingen =

- Municipality
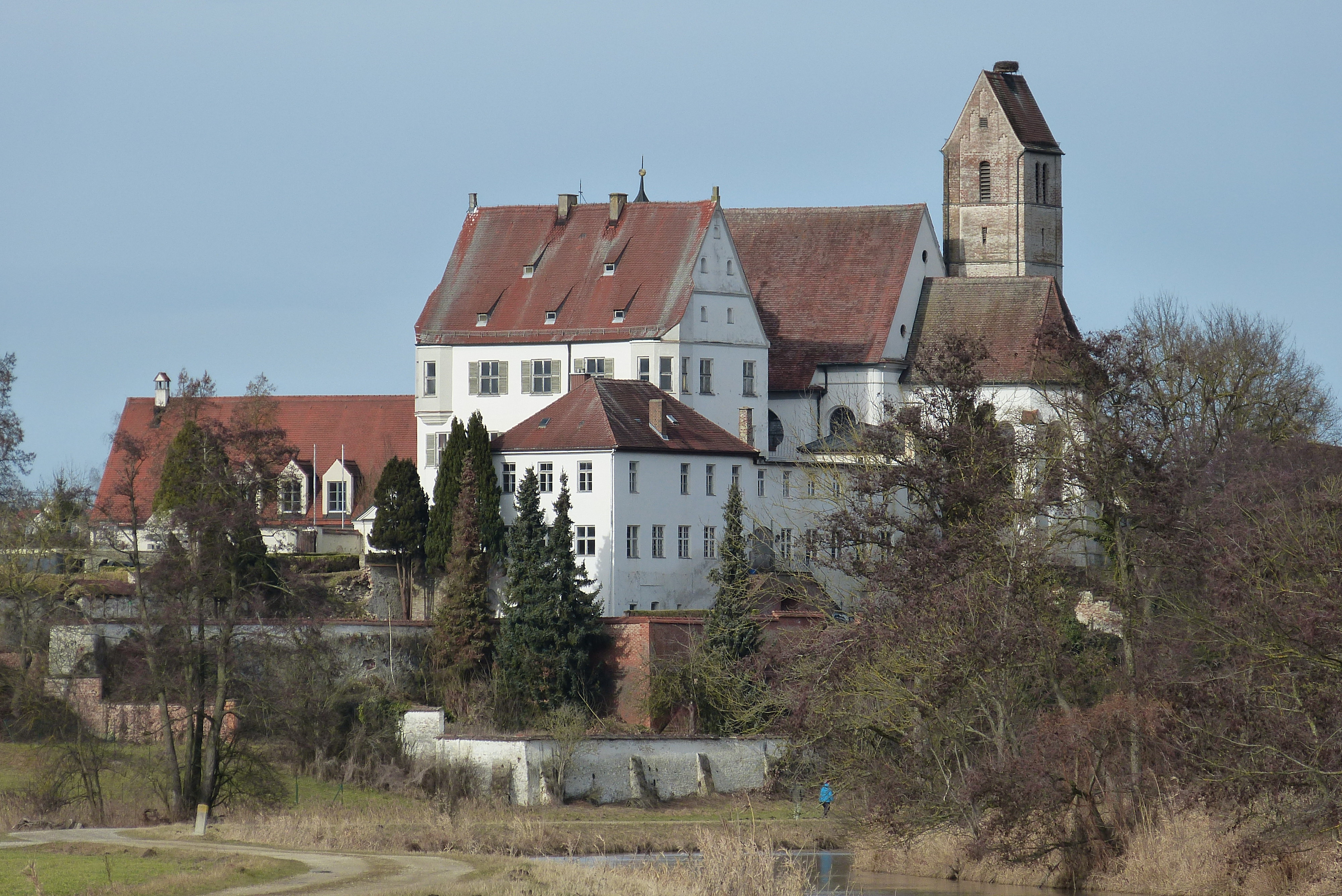
- Gablingen Castle with the Church of Saint Martin

- Coat of arms

- Location of Gablingen within Augsburg district
- Interactive map of Gablingen
- Location within Germany Location within Bavaria
- Coordinates: 48°27′N 10°49′E
- Country: Germany
- State: Bavaria
- Admin. region: Schwaben
- District: Augsburg

Government
  - Mayor (2020–26): Karina Ruf (CSU)

Area
  - Total: 26.74 km^{2} (10.32 sq mi)
- Elevation: 455 m (1,493 ft)

Population (2025-12-31)
  - Total: 4,804
  - Density: 179.7/km^{2} (465.3/sq mi)
- Time zone: UTC+01:00 (CET)
  - Summer (DST): UTC+02:00 (CEST)
- Postal codes: 86456
- Dialling codes: 08230
- Vehicle registration: A
- Website: www.gablingen.de

Gablingen is a municipality in the district of Augsburg in Bavaria in Germany. It lies on the river Schmutter.
