= Gersthofen =

- Municipality
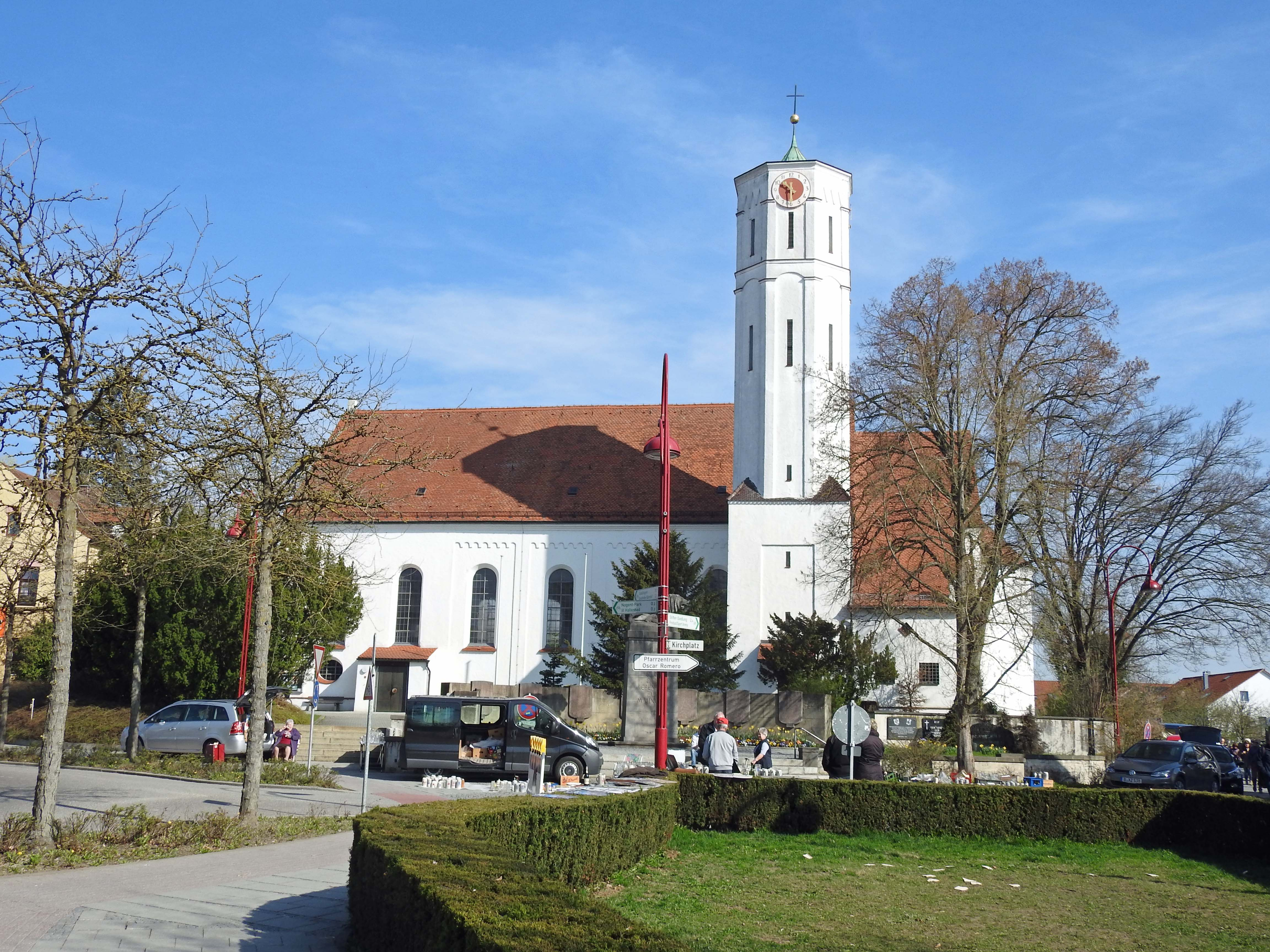
- Church of Saint James the Greater

- Coat of arms

- Location of Gersthofen within Augsburg district
- Interactive map of Gersthofen
- Location within Germany Location within Bavaria
- Coordinates: 48°25′N 10°52′E
- Country: Germany
- State: Bavaria
- Admin. region: Schwaben
- District: Augsburg

Government
  - Mayor (2020–26): Michael Wörle (Ind.)

Area
  - Total: 34.01 km^{2} (13.13 sq mi)
- Elevation: 469 m (1,539 ft)

Population (2025-12-31)
  - Total: 23,409
  - Density: 688.3/km^{2} (1,783/sq mi)
- Time zone: UTC+01:00 (CET)
  - Summer (DST): UTC+02:00 (CEST)
- Postal codes: 86368
- Dialling codes: 0821
- Vehicle registration: A
- Website: www.gersthofen.de

Gersthofen (German pronunciation: [ɡɛʁstˈhoːfn̩]) is a town in the district of Augsburg, in Bavaria, Germany. It is situated on the west bank of the river Lech, approx. 7 km (4.35 mi) north of Augsburg.

Gersthofen is divided into five Ortsteile: Batzenhofen, Edenbergen (with Gailenbach and Gailenbacher Mühle), Gersthofen, Hirblingen, and Rettenbergen (with Peterhof).

== History ==
=== Middle Ages ===
With the end of the Roman Empire era and the collapse of the Limes around 260 AD, Alemanni advanced into the land between the Lech and Iller rivers. A row grave found in Gersthofen in 1932 indicates the first traces of Alemannic settlement. The former monastery farm formed the historical settlement core of Gersthofen. Since the second half of the 7th century, the Herrenhof of a Germanic man named Gerfred stood on the site, from which a Carolingian manor farm and later Widdum emerged.

The place name Gersthofen derives from the first clan or village leader. The first mention occurred in 969 in a document by Bishop Ulrich of Augsburg, who transferred goods and income enjoyed by the newly founded monastery of St. Stephen from Abbess Elensinda as a church benefice to Gerfredeshoua. In 1150, a donation of a Hube with appurtenances in Gereshouen was mentioned in a document of the later Heilig-Kreuz monastery, which was confirmed by Bishop Walther along with other possessions.

In a bull of Pope Coelestine II from 1143, Gersthofen appears among the possessions of the Augsburg cathedral chapter. It had the right, among other things, to appoint the mayors of the farms in Gersthofen, Mertingen, and Biberbach. Through purchase and exchange, the chapter gradually acquired the entire village. The lower jurisdiction was exercised by the cathedral chapter through its own chief bailiff installed in Gersthofen. Besides the cathedral chapter as the main owner, Augsburg citizens and monasteries owned individual farms and parcels as episcopal, cathedral chapter, or common fiefs. Initially, the territorial Landvogtei of the Margraviate of Burgau was responsible for high jurisdiction. Eventually, through pledging, it came into the possession of the Imperial City of Augsburg.

=== Modern times ===
After secularization in 1803, Gersthofen fell to the Electorate of Bavaria. In 1804, Gersthofen was incorporated into the Göggingen district court through Bavaria's administrative reorganization. As part of the administrative reforms in Bavaria, the present municipality was established with the municipal edict of 1818. It belonged to the Lech district from 1808, the Upper Danube district from 1810, and the district of Swabia and Neuburg from 1838, later the administrative region of Swabia. In 1844, Gersthofen had 109 houses, 144 families, and 640 residents.

Around 1900, Gersthofen's development received a significant boost from the construction of the Lech Canal with a hydroelectric power plant and the Hoechst plant, which was supplied with electricity. In 1904, Gersthofen received the Gersthofen-Gablingen airfield, which was used by American troops as a barracks after World War II and has since been located on the fields of the Gablingen municipality. After World War II, the population of Gersthofen increased sharply due to the allocation of displaced persons. From 1939 to July 1954, the population of Gersthofen grew from 4,584 to 8,164, an increase of 78.1%.

The municipality was elevated to a market town in 1950 and to a city in 1969. Between 1988 and 2018, the city's population grew by 5,394 from 17,079 to 22,473 (an increase of 31.6%). Gersthofen is projected to have no more than 27,000 residents by 2030.

== Mayors ==
- Josef Helmschrott (CSU): 1947-1952
- Georg Wendler (independent): 1952-1967
- Karl J. Weiß: (CSU): 1967-1984
- Siegfried Deffner (CSU): 1984-2008
- Jürgen Schantin (W.I.R., till 2013 CSU): 2008-2014
- since May 2014: Michael Wörle (independent)

== Born in Gersthofen ==
- Hans Erdmenger (1903-1943), marine officer in the second World War
- Michael Martin (born 1948), photographer, geographer and author

== People related to Gersthofen ==
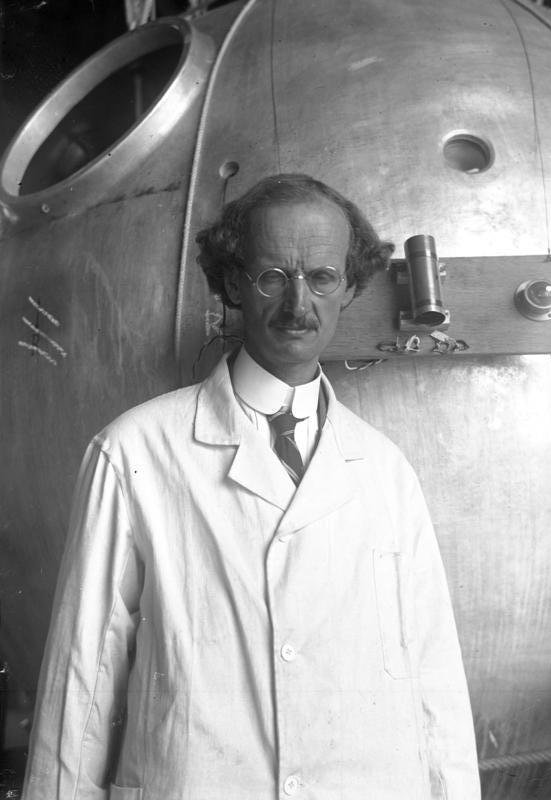
Auguste Piccard in 1932

- Auguste Piccard (1884-1962), Swiss scientist, physicist and explorer. Piccard started off in 1931 near Gersthofen with his Stratosphere - balloon to a research flight into Higher Air Layers. During this flight he and his assistant Paul Kipfer first reached an altitude of 15,781 meters.
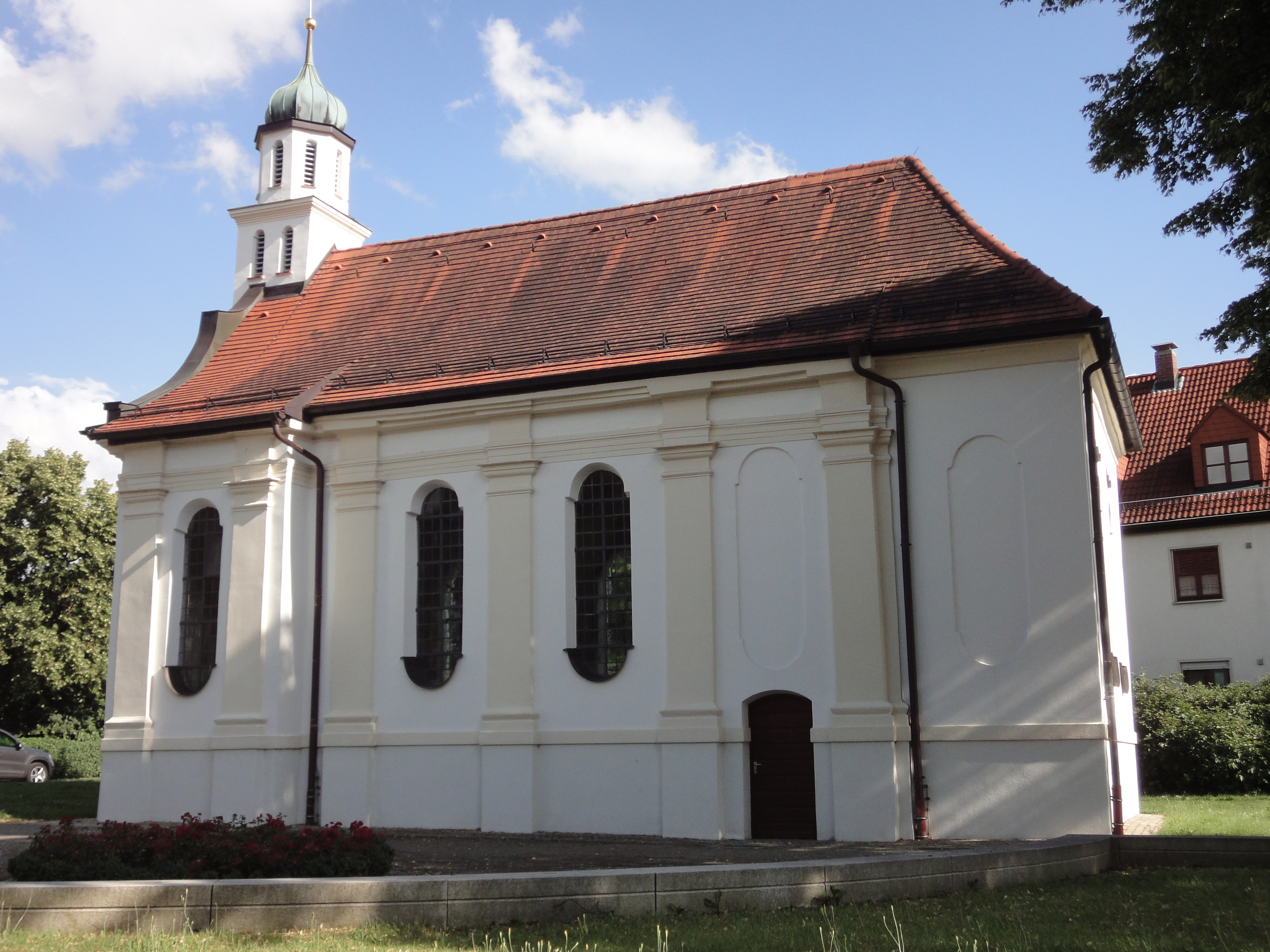
St. Emmeram chapel

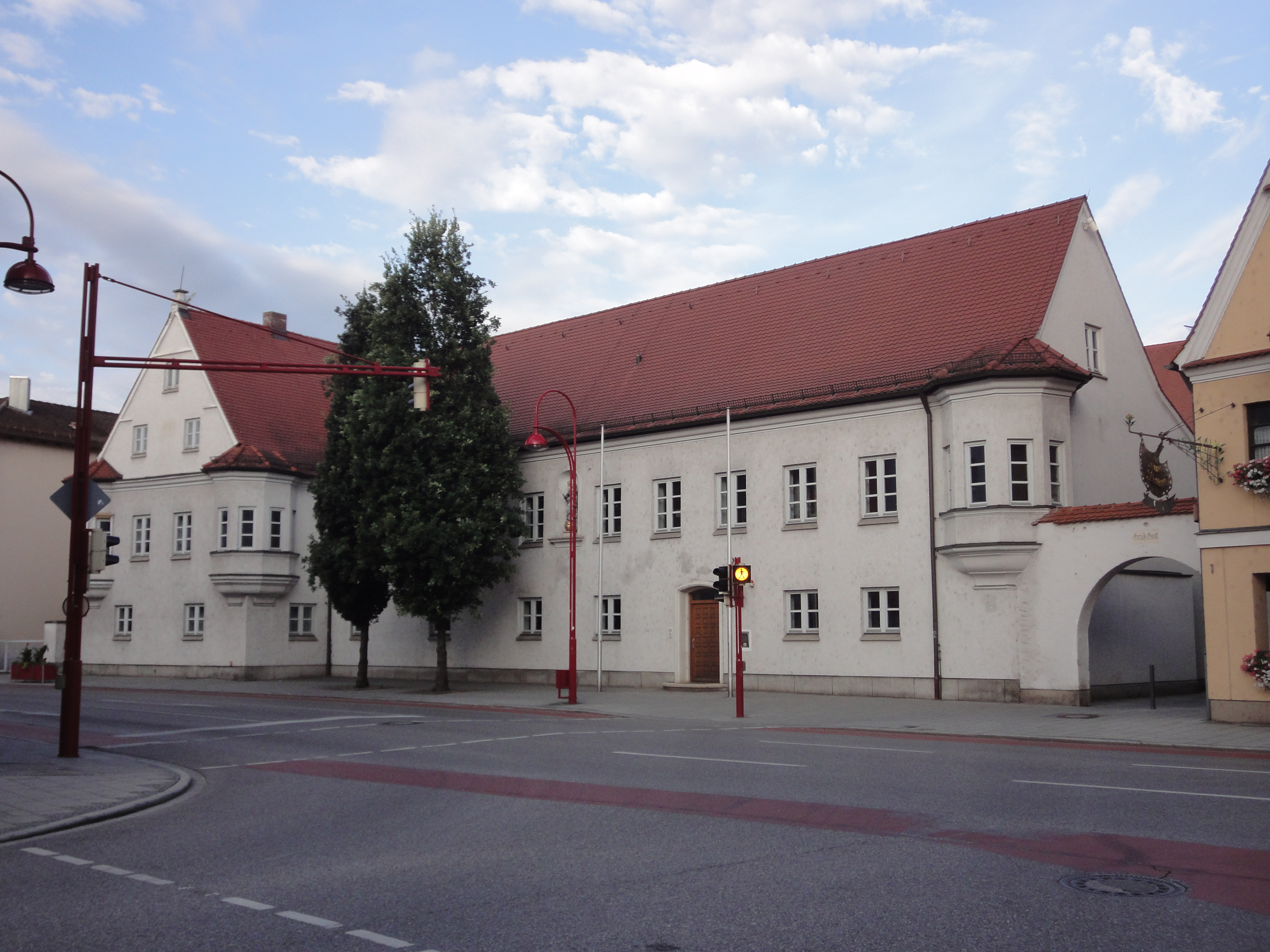
Town hall of Gersthofen

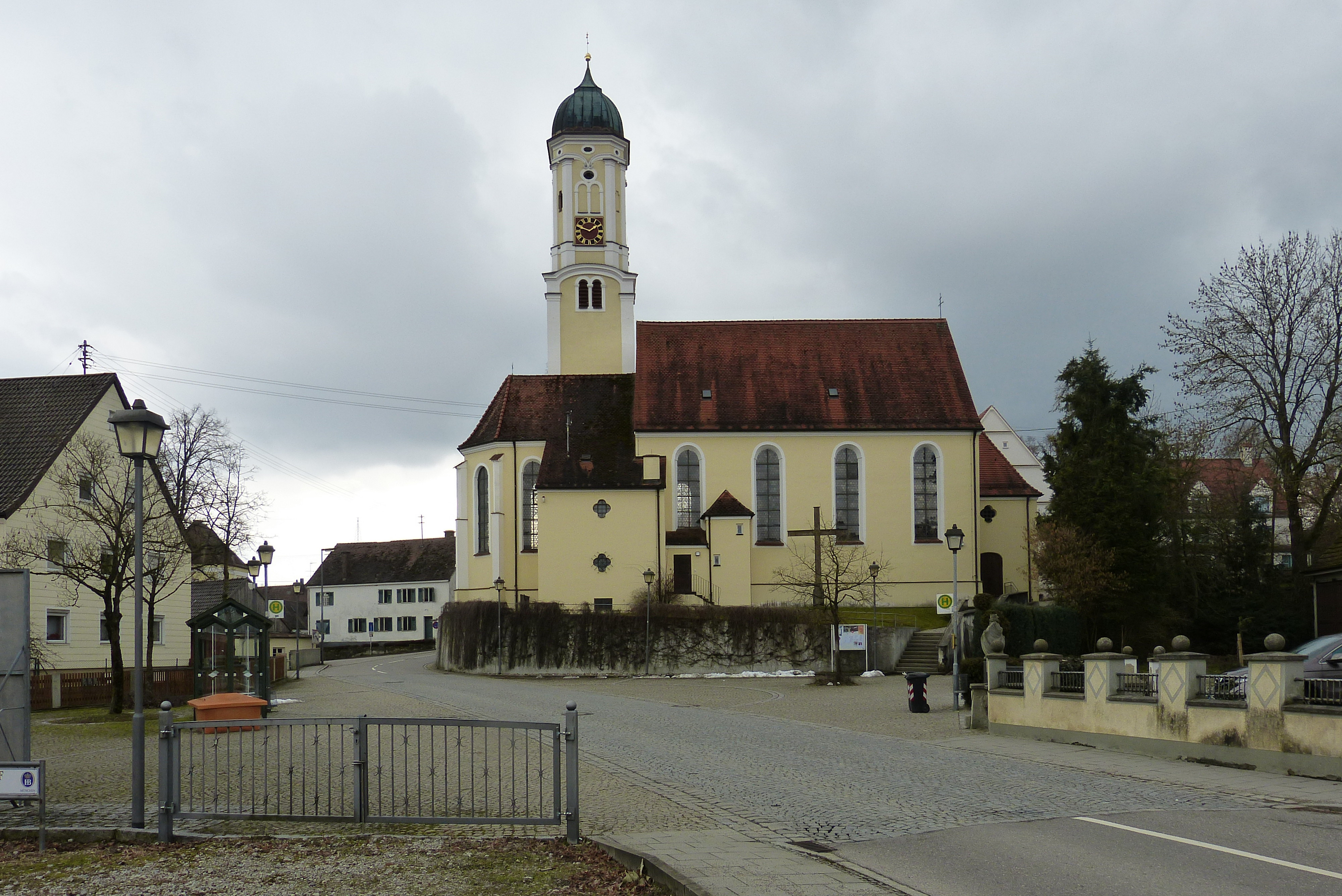
St. Martin Church in Batzenhofen
