= Mittelneufnach =

- Municipality
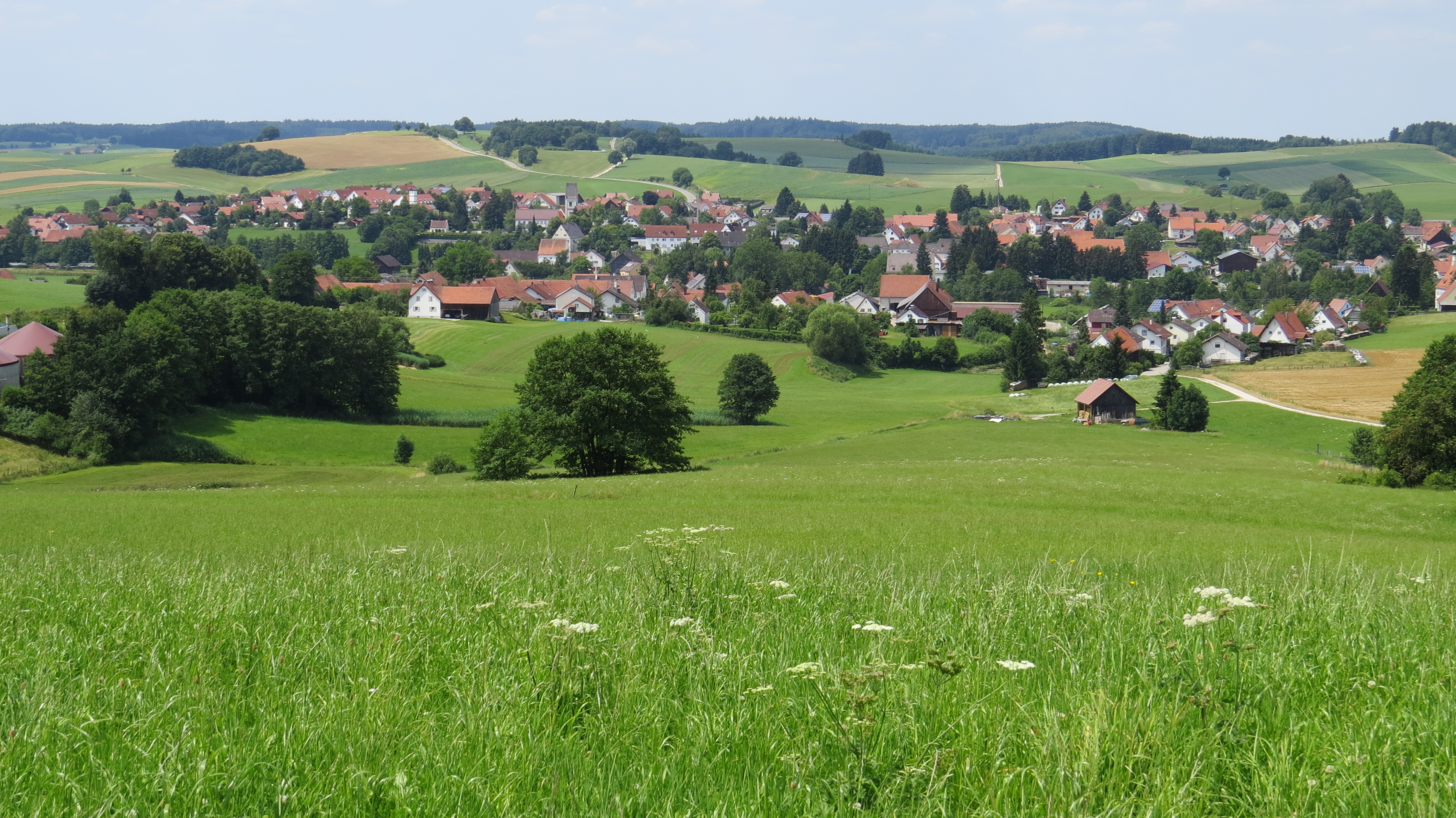
- Mittelneufnach seen from the northeast

- Coat of arms

- Location of Mittelneufnach within Augsburg district
- Interactive map of Mittelneufnach
- Location within Germany Location within Bavaria
- Coordinates: 48°11′N 10°36′E
- Country: Germany
- State: Bavaria
- Admin. region: Schwaben
- District: Augsburg
- Municipal assoc.: Stauden

Government
  - Mayor (2020–26): Cornelia Thümmel

Area
  - Total: 16.96 km^{2} (6.55 sq mi)
- Elevation: 560 m (1,840 ft)

Population (2025-12-31)
  - Total: 1,116
  - Density: 65.80/km^{2} (170.4/sq mi)
- Time zone: UTC+01:00 (CET)
  - Summer (DST): UTC+02:00 (CEST)
- Postal codes: 86868
- Dialling codes: 08262
- Vehicle registration: A
- Website: www.mittelneufnach.de

Mittelneufnach is a municipality in the district of Augsburg in Bavaria in Germany.
