= Mickhausen =

- Municipality
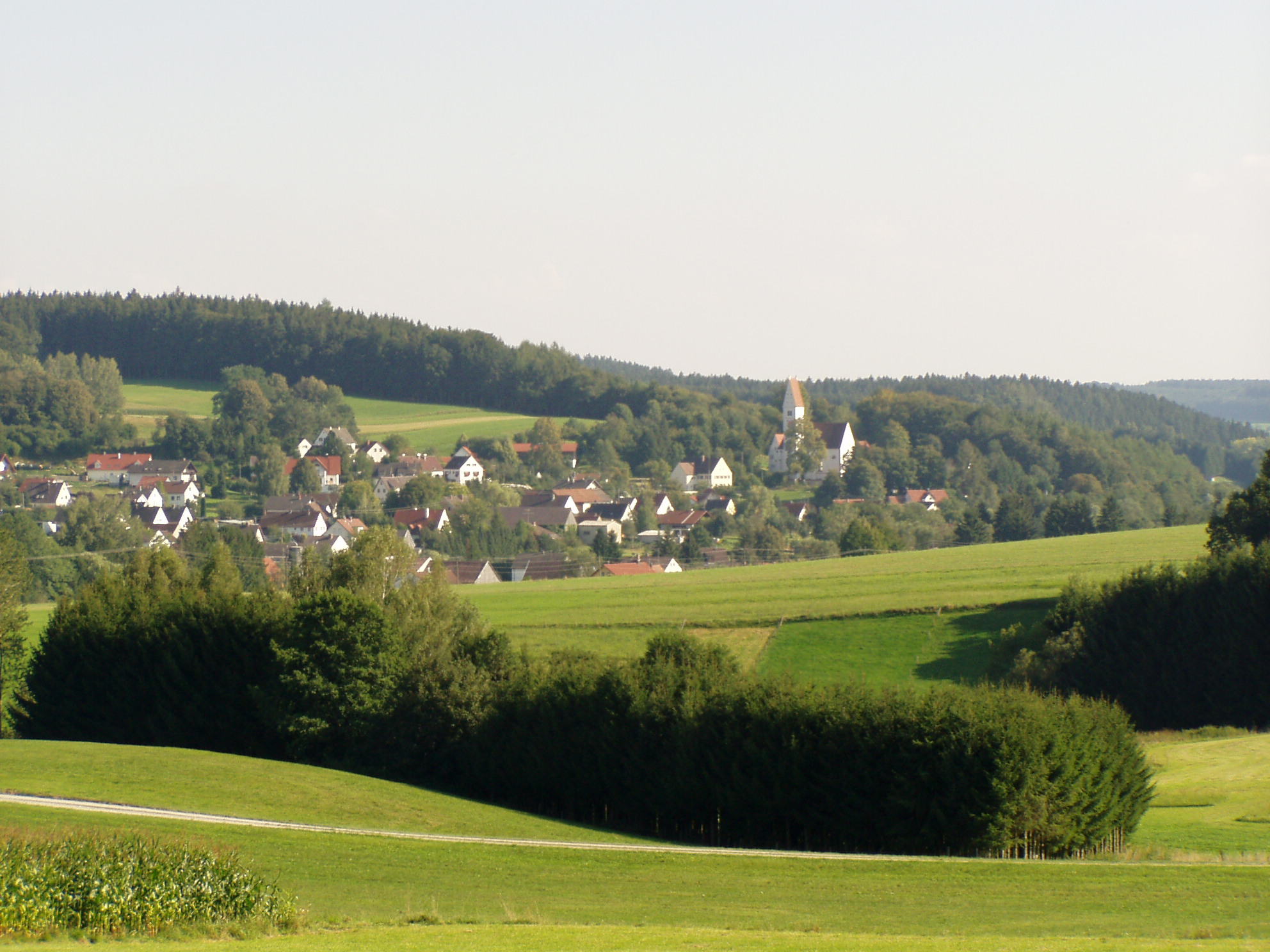
- Mickhausen from the northwest

- Coat of arms

- Location of Mickhausen within Augsburg district
- Interactive map of Mickhausen
- Location within Germany Location within Bavaria
- Coordinates: 48°15′N 10°37′E
- Country: Germany
- State: Bavaria
- Admin. region: Schwaben
- District: Augsburg
- Municipal assoc.: Stauden

Government
  - Mayor (2020–26): Mirko Kujath

Area
  - Total: 15.48 km^{2} (5.98 sq mi)
- Elevation: 540 m (1,770 ft)

Population (2025-12-31)
  - Total: 1,367
  - Density: 88.31/km^{2} (228.7/sq mi)
- Time zone: UTC+01:00 (CET)
  - Summer (DST): UTC+02:00 (CEST)
- Postal codes: 86866
- Dialling codes: 08204
- Vehicle registration: A
- Website: www.mickhausen.de

Mickhausen is a municipality in the district of Augsburg in Bavaria in Germany.
