= Stauden =

- Verwaltungsgemeinschaft
- Location of Stauden within Augsburg district
- Interactive map of Stauden
- Location within Germany Location within Bavaria
- Coordinates: 48°15′N 10°36′E
- Country: Germany
- State: Bavaria
- Admin. region: Swabia
- District: Augsburg
- Seat: Langenneufnach
- Subdivisions: 5 municipalities

Area
  - Total: 74.05 km^{2} (28.59 sq mi)

Population (2025-12-31)
  - Total: 6,728
  - Density: 90.86/km^{2} (235.3/sq mi)
- Time zone: UTC+01:00 (CET)
  - Summer (DST): UTC+02:00 (CEST)
- Website: www.vgstauden.de

Stauden is a Verwaltungsgemeinschaft (municipal association) in the district of Augsburg in Bavaria, Germany. Its seat is in Langenneufnach.

It consists of the following municipalities:

1. Langenneufnach
2. Mickhausen
3. Mittelneufnach
4. Scherstetten
5. Walkertshofen
