= Langenneufnach =

- Municipality
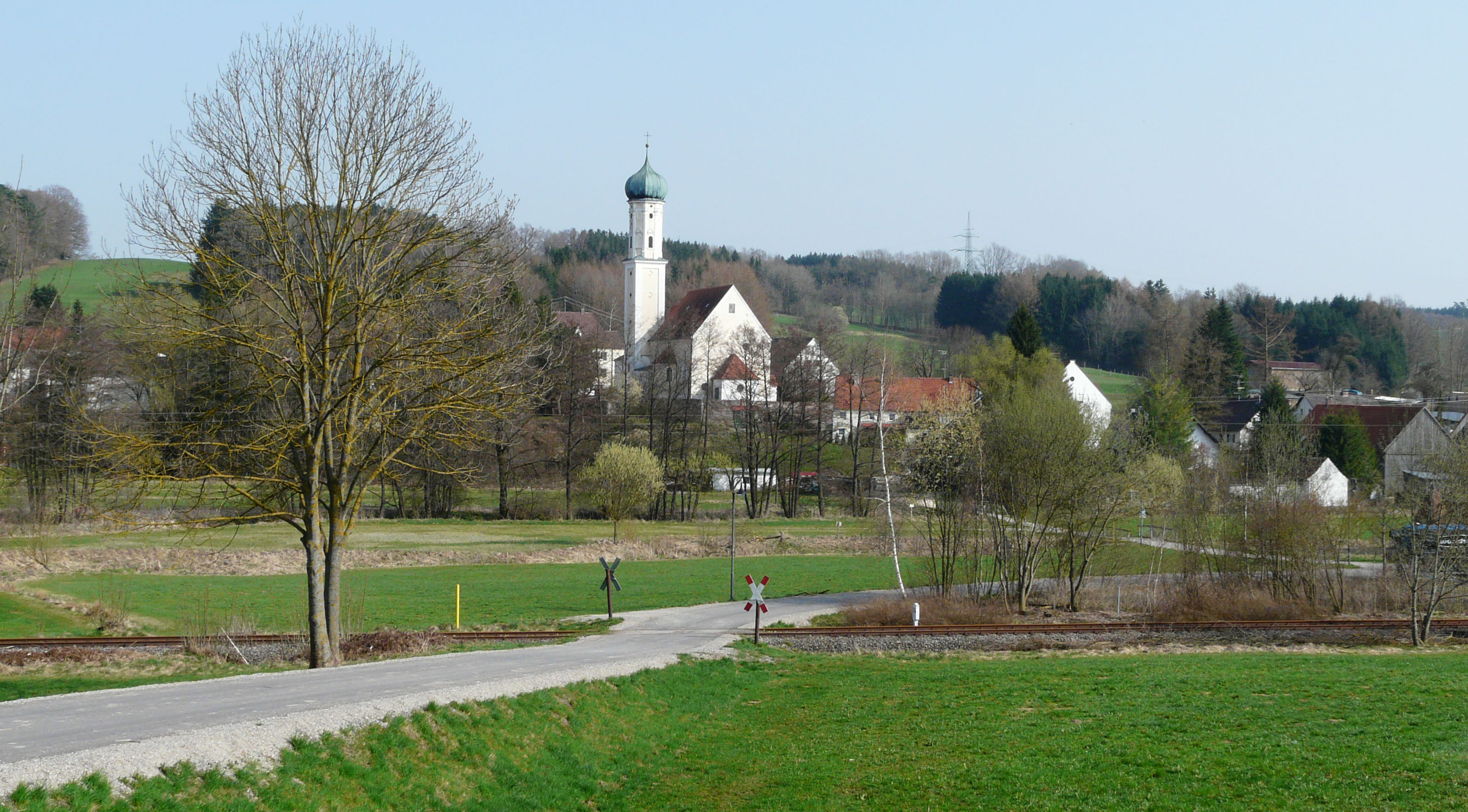
- Church of Saint Martin

- Coat of arms

- Location of Langenneufnach within Augsburg district
- Interactive map of Langenneufnach
- Location within Germany Location within Bavaria
- Coordinates: 48°16′N 10°35′E
- Country: Germany
- State: Bavaria
- Admin. region: Schwaben
- District: Augsburg
- Municipal assoc.: Stauden

Government
  - Mayor (2020–26): Gerald Eichinger

Area
  - Total: 12.87 km^{2} (4.97 sq mi)
- Elevation: 508–586 m (1,667–1,923 ft)

Population (2025-12-31)
  - Total: 1,967
  - Density: 152.8/km^{2} (395.8/sq mi)
- Time zone: UTC+01:00 (CET)
  - Summer (DST): UTC+02:00 (CEST)
- Postal codes: 86863
- Dialling codes: 08239
- Vehicle registration: A
- Website: www.langenneufnach.de

Langenneufnach is a municipality in the district of Augsburg in Bavaria in Germany.
