= Türkheim =

- Municipality
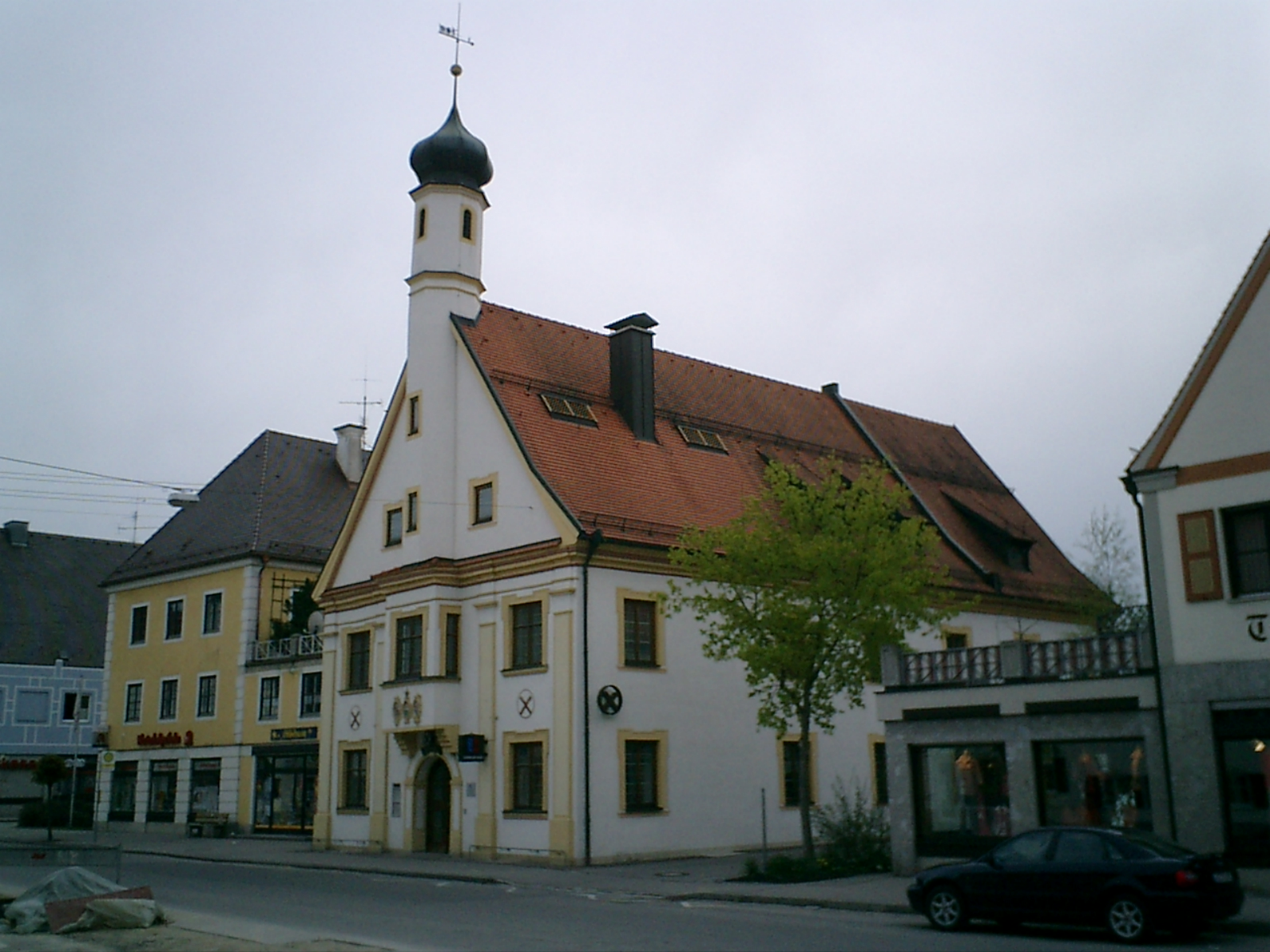
- The old town hall

- Coat of arms

- Location of Türkheim within Unterallgäu district
- Interactive map of Türkheim
- Location within Germany Location within Bavaria
- Coordinates: 48°4′N 10°37′E
- Country: Germany
- State: Bavaria
- Admin. region: Schwaben
- District: Unterallgäu
- Municipal assoc.: Türkheim

Government
  - Mayor (2022–28): Christian Kähler

Area
  - Total: 31.56 km^{2} (12.19 sq mi)
- Elevation: 598 m (1,962 ft)

Population (2025-12-31)
  - Total: 7,454
  - Density: 236.2/km^{2} (611.7/sq mi)
- Time zone: UTC+01:00 (CET)
  - Summer (DST): UTC+02:00 (CEST)
- Postal codes: 86842
- Dialling codes: 08245
- Vehicle registration: MN
- Website: www.tuerkheim.de

Türkheim (German pronunciation: [ˈtʏʁkhaɪm]) is a municipality in the district of Unterallgäu in Bavaria, Germany. The neighboring places of Türkheim are Ettringen, Berg, Rammingen, Irsingen, Wiedergeltingen and Amberg. The Gemeinderat (municipal council) of Türkheim administers Türkheim and Irsingen. The town is the seat of a municipal association with Amberg, Rammingen and Wiedergeltingen.

Educational facilities in the municipality include the Joseph-Bernhart-Gymnasium.

Subcamp Türkheim of the Dachau concentration camp operated here in the time of the Third Reich.
