= Rammingen, Bavaria =

Rammingen
- Municipality
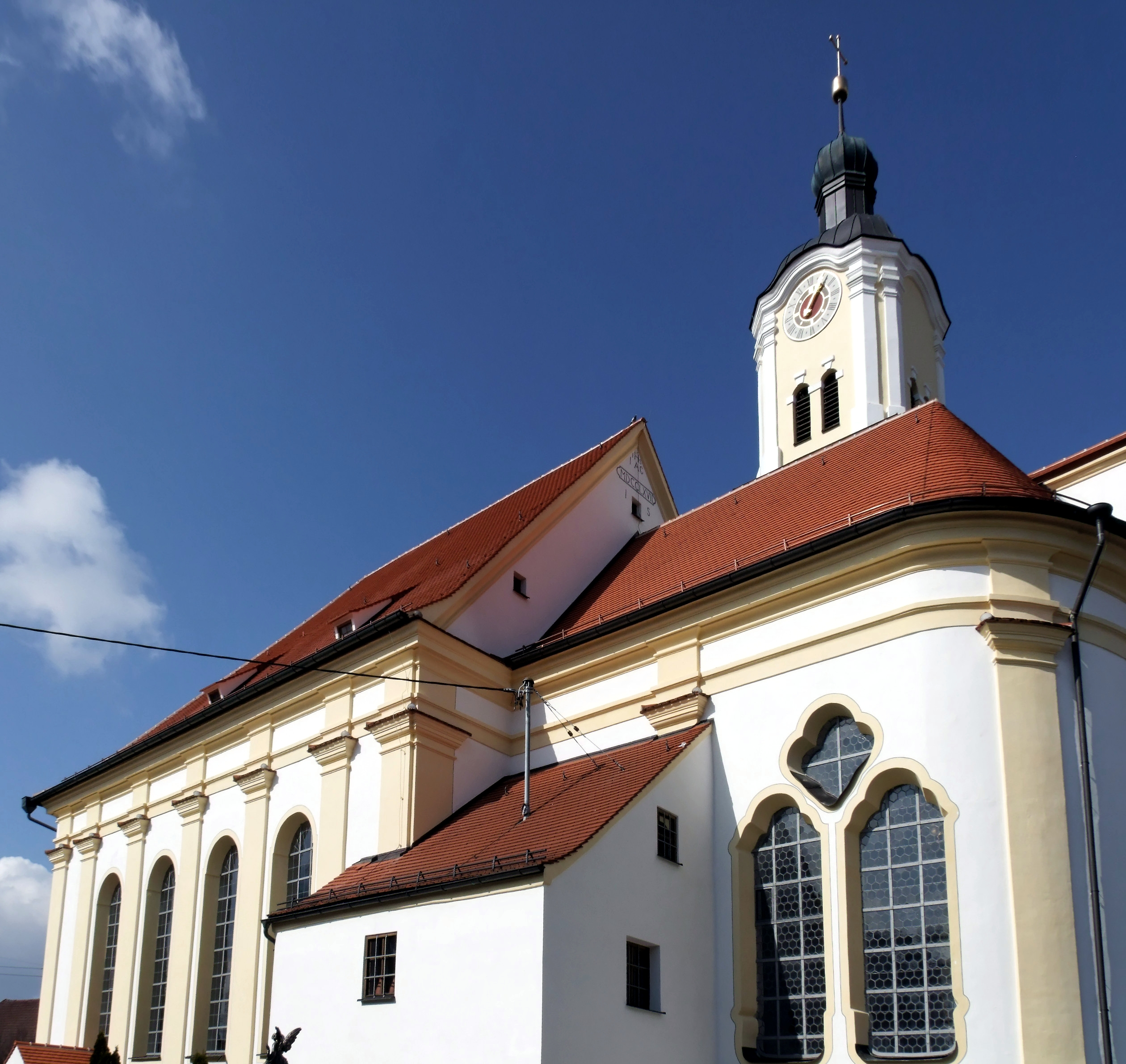
- Saint Magnus Church in Unterrammingen

- Coat of arms

- Location of Rammingen within Unterallgäu district
- Interactive map of Rammingen
- Location within Germany Location within Bavaria
- Coordinates: 48°4′N 10°35′E
- Country: Germany
- State: Bavaria
- Admin. region: Schwaben
- District: Unterallgäu
- Municipal assoc.: Türkheim

Government
  - Mayor (2020–26): Anton Schwele (FW)

Area
  - Total: 19.26 km^{2} (7.44 sq mi)
- Elevation: 650 m (2,130 ft)

Population (2025-12-31)
  - Total: 1,576
  - Density: 81.83/km^{2} (211.9/sq mi)
- Time zone: UTC+01:00 (CET)
  - Summer (DST): UTC+02:00 (CEST)
- Postal codes: 86871
- Dialling codes: 08245
- Vehicle registration: MN
- Website: www.rammingen.de

Rammingen (German pronunciation: [ˈʁamɪŋən]) is a municipality in the district of Unterallgäu in Bavaria, Germany. The town has a municipal association with Türkheim.
