= Schmutter =

River in Germany

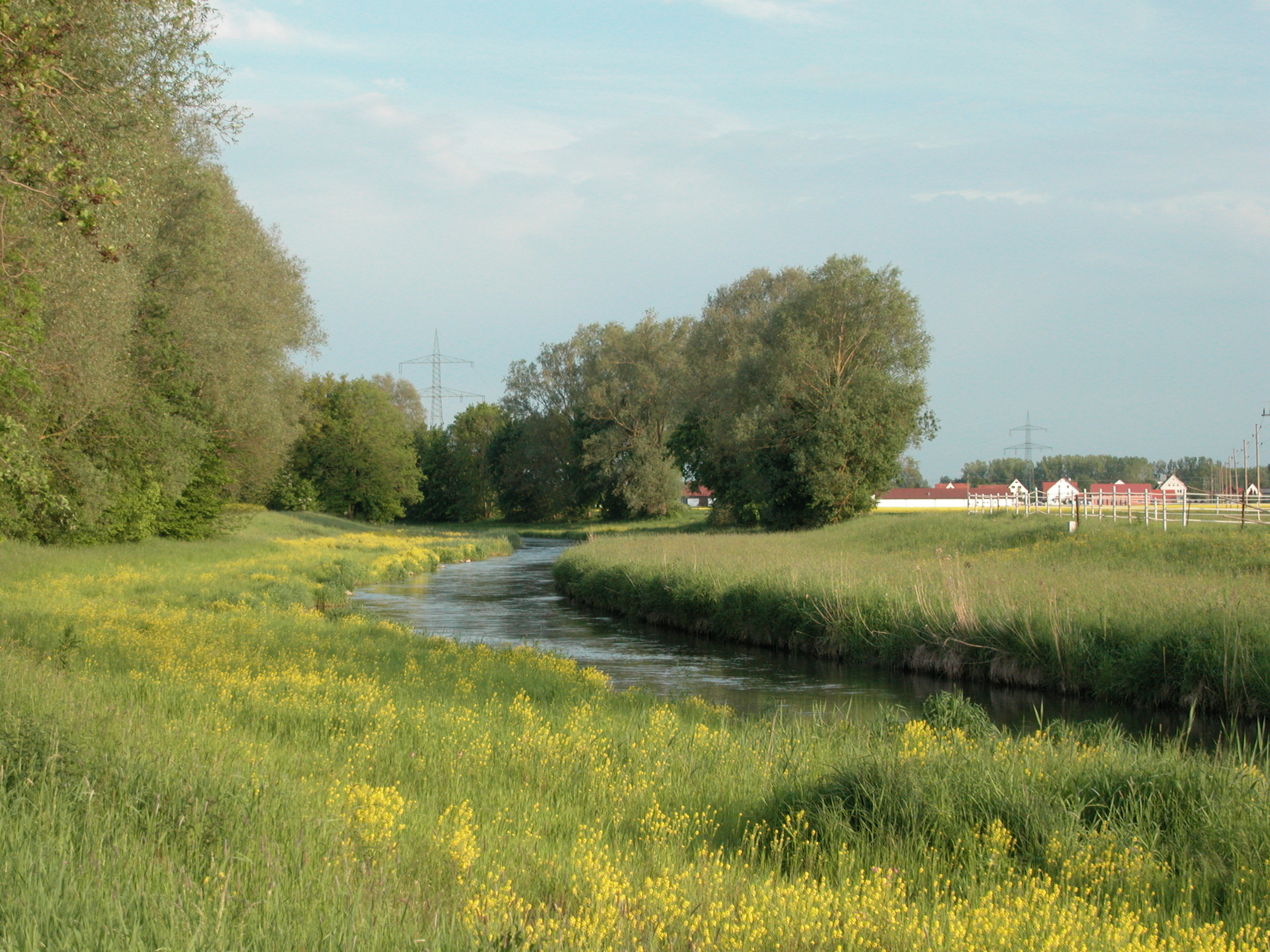
- The Schmutter near Gablingen

Location
- Country: Germany
- State: Bavaria

Physical characteristics
- Source
  - location: Swabia
- Mouth
  - location: Danube
  - coordinates: 48°42′35″N 10°48′1″E
- Length: 95.6 km (59.4 mi)
- Basin size: 506 km^{2} (195 sq mi)

Basin features
- Progression: Danube→ Black Sea

The Schmutter (German pronunciation: [ˈʃmʊtɐ]) is a river in Bavaria, Germany, a right tributary of the Danube.

The Schmutter's source is 6 km (3.7 mi) southwest of Schwabmünchen, in the Swabia region of Bavaria. The Schmutter flows north, and for several tens of kilometers it flows parallel to the Lech, at only a few km west of the Lech. It flows into the Danube near Donauwörth. Towns along the Schmutter include Fischach, Neusäß, Gablingen and Mertingen.

== See also ==
- List of rivers of Bavaria
