= Obergriesbach station =

Railway station in Germany

Obergriesbach

General information
- Location: Am Bahnhof 4; 86573 Obergriesbach; Bavaria; Germany
- Coordinates: 48.4220°N 11.0798°E
- Owner: DB Netz
- Operator: DB Station&Service
- Lines: Paar Valley Railway (KBS 983)
- Platforms: 1 side platform
- Tracks: 1
- Train operators: Bayerische Regiobahn

Other information
- Station code: 4643
- DS100 code: MOGB
- IBNR: 8004532
- Category: 6
- Fare zone: : 50
- Website: www.bahnhof.de

Services
Preceding station		Following station
Dasing towards Augsburg Hbf	RB 13	Aichach towards Ingolstadt Hbf
Location
- Location within Bavaria Location within Germany Location within Europe

Obergriesbach station is a railway station in the municipality of Obergriesbach, located in the district of Aichach-Friedberg in Swabia, Germany.
