= Dasing station =

Railway station in Dasing, Germany

Dasing

General information
- Location: Bahnhofstraße 8; 86453 Dasing; Bavaria; Germany
- Coordinates: 48.3863°N 11.0519°E
- Owner: Deutsche Bahn
- Operator: DB Netz; DB Station&Service
- Lines: Paar Valley Railway (KBS 983)
- Platforms: 2 side platforms
- Tracks: 2
- Train operators: Bayerische Regiobahn
- Bus routes: 6
- Bus stands: 3
- Bus operators: MVV (X732), AVV (203, 204, 205, 206, 209)
- Connections: X732, 203, 204, 205,206, 209

Construction
- Structure type: At-grade
- Parking: Free Parking Spots
- Cycle facilities: Free Bicycle Parking Spots

Other information
- Station code: 1134
- DS100 code: MDAG
- IBNR: 8001382
- Category: 6
- Fare zone: Augsburger Verkehrs- und Tarifverbund: 40; Münchner Verkehrs- und Tarifverbund: 5 and 6
- Website: www.bahnhof.de

Services
| Preceding station | | Following station |
|---|---|---|
| Friedberg (b Augsburg) towards Augsburg Hbf | RB 13 | Obergriesbach towards Ingolstadt Hbf |
Location
- Location within Bavaria Location within Germany Location within Europe

Dasing station is a railway station in the municipality of Dasing, located in the district of Aichach-Friedberg in Swabia, Germany.
