= Friedberg (b Augsburg) station =

Railway station in Germany

Friedberg (b Augsburg)
- 2019

General information
- Location: Bahnhofstraße 28; 86316 Friedberg; Bavaria; Germany
- Coordinates: 48.3522°N 10.9824°E
- Owner: Deutsche Bahn
- Operator: DB InfraGO
- Lines: Paar Valley Railway (KBS 983)
- Platforms: 2 side platforms
- Tracks: 2
- Train operators: Bayerische Regiobahn

Other information
- Station code: 1929
- DS100 code: MFDB
- IBNR: 8002099
- Category: 5
- Fare zone: : 20 and 30
- Website: www.bahnhof.de

Services
Preceding station		Following station
Augsburg-Hochzoll towards Augsburg Hbf	RB 13	Dasing towards Ingolstadt Hbf
Location
- Location within Bavaria Location within Germany Location within Europe

Friedberg (b Augsburg) station is a railway station in the municipality of Friedberg, located in the district of Aichach-Friedberg in Swabia, Germany.
