= Theodor Körner (German politician) =

German jurist and politician (1941–2018)

Theodor Körner (September 26, 1941 – August 31, 2018) was a German administrative lawyer and local politician (CSU). From 1989 to 2002, he was district administrator of Aichach-Friedberg.

== Biography ==
After graduating from high school in 1962, he studied law at LMU Munich. He passed his first state law examination in 1968 and the second in 1971. From 1973, he worked in the civil service. He acquired his doctorate in 1977.

From 1980, he worked as an administrative director and personal assistant to Franz Heubl, the president of the state parliament. In 1982, he became head of department at the Bavarian School of Administration. He was also a lecturer at the Bavarian Civil Service College and the College of Administration until 1989.

In March 1989, he was elected to succeed Josef Bestler as district administrator of Aichach-Friedberg, after serving as his deputy since 1984. He officially took office on July 1 that year. During his tenure, the Wittelsbacher Land e. V. was founded in order to be able to access European funding from the LEADER program for rural areas, and to promote Direct-to-consumer sale of agricultural products in Aichach-Friedberg. His term in office was marked by challenges, such as landfills and the construction of a waste recycling plant. Solutions to remedy budget cuts to hospitals in the district (closure of Aindling and Mering Hospitals) were developed during his tenure. The Edith Stein School (A Special education school) in Aichach was built during his term in office. He left office on April 30, 2002.

Since his admission to the bar in July 2003, he worked as a lawyer. He was a partner in a law firm based in Aichach.

In September 2011, he was awarded the honorary title of "Altlandrat" by the district council of the Aichach-Friedberg district. The town of Friedberg awarded him honorary citizenship in 2016.

On October 19, 2015, he was awarded the papal cross of honor 'Pro Ecclesia et Pontifice' by Pope Francis, personally given to him by diocesan bishop Konrad Zdarsa.

Körner was married and had a son. He died on August 31, 2018, at the age of 76.

== Works ==
- Iuramentum und frühe Friedensbewegung: (10.–12. Jh.) Berlin: Schweitzer, 1977.

== In media ==
- Wer ist Wer? Das deutsche Who's who, Band 42. Schmidt-Römhild, 2003.
