= Aichach station =

Railway station in Aichach, Germany

Aichach

General information
- Location: Bahnhofstraße 25; 86551 Aichach; Bavaria; Germany
- Coordinates: 48.461°N 11.123°E
- Owner: DB Netz
- Operator: DB Station&Service
- Lines: Paar Valley Railway (KBS 983)
- Platforms: 2 side platforms
- Tracks: 2
- Train operators: Bayerische Regiobahn

Other information
- Station code: 34
- DS100 code: MAI
- IBNR: 8000452
- Category: 5
- Fare zone: : 50 and 60
- Website: www.bahnhof.de

Services
Preceding station		Following station
Obergriesbach towards Augsburg Hbf	RB 13	Radersdorf towards Ingolstadt Hbf
Location
- Location within Bavaria Location within Germany Location within Europe

Aichach station is a railway station in the municipality of Aichach, located in the district of Aichach-Friedberg in Swabia, Germany.
