= Donau-Ries (electoral district) =

Federal electoral district of Germany

253 Donau-Ries
- Electoral district for the Bundestag
- Donau-Ries in 2025
- State: Bavaria
- Population: 259,100 (2019)
- Electorate: 195,774 (2021)
- Major settlements: Nördlingen; Donauwörth; Dillingen an der Donau
- Area: 2,332.2 km^{2}

Current electoral district
- Created: 1949
- Party: CSU
- Member: Ulrich Lange
- Elected: 2009, 2013, 2017, 2021, 2025

Donau-Ries is an electoral constituency (German: Wahlkreis) represented in the Bundestag. It elects one member via first-past-the-post voting. Under the current constituency numbering system, it is designated as constituency 253. It is located in western Bavaria, comprising the Dillingen district, Donau-Ries district, and the northern part of the Aichach-Friedberg district.

Donau-Ries was created for the inaugural 1949 federal election. Since 2009, it has been represented by Ulrich Lange of the Christian Social Union (CSU).

== Geography ==
Donau-Ries is located in western Bavaria. As of the 2025 federal election, it comprises the districts of Dillingen and Donau-Ries as well as the municipality of Inchenhofen and the Verwaltungsgemeinschaften of Aindling, Kühbach, and Pöttmes from the Aichach-Friedberg district.

== History ==
Donau-Ries was created in 1949, then known as Donauwörth. It acquired its current name in the 1976 election. In the 1949 election, it was Bavaria constituency 44 in the numbering system. In the 1953 through 1961 elections, it was number 239. In the 1965 through 1998 elections, it was number 240. In the 2002 and 2005 elections, it was number 255. In the 2009 through 2021 elections, it was number 254. From the 2025 election, it has been number 253.

Originally, the constituency comprised the independent cities of Neuburg an der Donau and Nördlingen and the districts of Donauwörth, Landkreis Neuburg an der Donau, and Landkreis Nördlingen. In the 1965 through 1972 elections, it also contained the independent city of Dillingen an der Donau and the Landkreis Dillingen district. In the 1976 through 1994 elections, it comprised the districts of Donau-Ries and Dillingen. In the 1998 election, it acquired the municipality of Inchenhofen and the Verwaltungsgemeinschaften of Kühbach and Pöttmes from the Aichach-Friedberg district. In the 2005 election, it further acquired the Verwaltungsgemeinschaft of Aindling. In the 2021 election, it acquired the municipality of Altenmünster from Landkreis Augsburg, which was reversed ahead of the 2025 election.

Election	No.	Name	Borders
1949	44	Donauwörth	Neuburg an der Donau city; Nördlingen city; Donauwörth district; Landkreis Neuburg an der Donau district; Landkreis Nördlingen district
1953	239	Donauwörth	Neuburg an der Donau city; Nördlingen city; Donauwörth district; Landkreis Neuburg an der Donau district; Landkreis Nördlingen district
1957	239	Donauwörth	Neuburg an der Donau city; Nördlingen city; Donauwörth district; Landkreis Neuburg an der Donau district; Landkreis Nördlingen district
1961	239	Donauwörth	Neuburg an der Donau city; Nördlingen city; Donauwörth district; Landkreis Neuburg an der Donau district; Landkreis Nördlingen district
1965	240	Donauwörth	Neuburg an der Donau city; Nördlingen city; Dillingen an der Donau city; Donauwörth district; Landkreis Neuburg an der Donau district; Landkreis Nördlingen district; Landkreis Dillingen district
1969	240	Donauwörth	Neuburg an der Donau city; Nördlingen city; Dillingen an der Donau city; Donauwörth district; Landkreis Neuburg an der Donau district; Landkreis Nördlingen district; Landkreis Dillingen district
1972	240	Donauwörth	Neuburg an der Donau city; Nördlingen city; Dillingen an der Donau city; Donauwörth district; Landkreis Neuburg an der Donau district; Landkreis Nördlingen district; Landkreis Dillingen district
1976	240	Donau-Ries	Donau-Ries district; Dillingen district
1980	240	Donau-Ries	Donau-Ries district; Dillingen district
1983	240	Donau-Ries	Donau-Ries district; Dillingen district
1987	240	Donau-Ries	Donau-Ries district; Dillingen district
1990	240	Donau-Ries	Donau-Ries district; Dillingen district
1994	240	Donau-Ries	Donau-Ries district; Dillingen district
1998	240	Donau-Ries	Donau-Ries district; Dillingen district; Aichach-Friedberg district (only Inchenhofen municipality and Kühbach and Pöttmes Verwaltungsgemeinschaften)
2002	255	Donau-Ries	Donau-Ries district; Dillingen district; Aichach-Friedberg district (only Inchenhofen municipality and Kühbach and Pöttmes Verwaltungsgemeinschaften)
2005	255	Donau-Ries	Donau-Ries district; Dillingen district; Aichach-Friedberg district (only Inchenhofen municipality and Aindling, Kühbach, and Pöttmes Verwaltungsgemeinschaften)
2009	254	Donau-Ries	Donau-Ries district; Dillingen district; Aichach-Friedberg district (only Inchenhofen municipality and Aindling, Kühbach, and Pöttmes Verwaltungsgemeinschaften)
2013	254	Donau-Ries	Donau-Ries district; Dillingen district; Aichach-Friedberg district (only Inchenhofen municipality and Aindling, Kühbach, and Pöttmes Verwaltungsgemeinschaften)
2017	254	Donau-Ries	Donau-Ries district; Dillingen district; Aichach-Friedberg district (only Inchenhofen municipality and Aindling, Kühbach, and Pöttmes Verwaltungsgemeinschaften)
2021	254	Donau-Ries	Donau-Ries district; Dillingen district; Aichach-Friedberg district (only Inchenhofen municipality and Aindling, Kühbach, and Pöttmes Verwaltungsgemeinschaften); Landkreis Augsburg district (only Altenmünster municipality)
2025	253	Donau-Ries	Donau-Ries district; Dillingen district; Aichach-Friedberg district (only Inchenhofen municipality and Aindling, Kühbach, and Pöttmes Verwaltungsgemeinschaften)

== Members ==
The constituency has been held continuously by the Christian Social Union (CSU) since its creation. It was first represented by Martin Loibl from 1949 to 1953, followed by Philipp Meyer from 1953 to his death in 1962. Karl Heinz Lemmrich was representative from 1965 to 1990, a total of seven consecutive terms. Hans Raidel then served from 1990 to 2009. Ulrich Lange was elected in 2009, and re-elected in 2013, 2017, and 2021.

Election	Member	Party	%
1949	Martin Loibl	CSU	36.2
1953	Philipp Meyer	CSU	59.1
1957	Philipp Meyer	CSU	69.2
1961	Philipp Meyer	CSU	64.8
1965	Karl Heinz Lemmrich	CSU	68.3
1969	Karl Heinz Lemmrich	CSU	67.3
1972	Karl Heinz Lemmrich	CSU	65.4
1976	Karl Heinz Lemmrich	CSU	68.0
1980	Karl Heinz Lemmrich	CSU	65.7
1983	Karl Heinz Lemmrich	CSU	67.8
1987	Karl Heinz Lemmrich	CSU	61.2
1990	Hans Raidel	CSU	55.0
1994	Hans Raidel	CSU	60.6
1998	Hans Raidel	CSU	57.2
2002	Hans Raidel	CSU	64.7
2005	Hans Raidel	CSU	60.7
2009	Ulrich Lange	CSU	52.6
2013	Ulrich Lange	CSU	60.6
2017	Ulrich Lange	CSU	47.0
2021	Ulrich Lange	CSU	41.1

== Election results ==
=== 2025 election ===
Federal election (2025): Donau-Ries
Notes:	Blue background denotes the winner of the electorate vote. Pink background denotes a candidate elected from their party list. Yellow background denotes an electorate win by a list member, or other incumbent. A ✓ or ✗ denotes status of any incumbent, win or lose respectively.						
Party	Candidate	Votes	%	±%	Party votes	%	±%
CSU	✓ Ulrich Lange	73,296	45.1	▲4.0	67,118	41.2	▲6.0
AfD	Andreas Mayer	34,916	21.5	▲11.4	36,829	22.6	▲11.6
SPD	Christoph Schmid	19,720	12.1	▼7.1	15,226	9.4	▼7.2
FW	Florian Riehl	9,972	6.1	▼3.3	10,291	6.3	▼3.2
Greens	Adrian Lund	9,398	5.8	▼1.3	11,853	7.3	▼2.2
Left	Leon Florian	5,536	3.4	▲1.5	6,249	3.8	▲2.0·
FDP	Hans-Peter Posch	3,895	2.4	▼4.0	6,071	3.7	▼6.3
BSW	Manfred Seel	3,535	2.2		4,968	3.1	
dieBasis	Benjamin Goßner	1,411	0.9	▼1.6	911	0.6	▼1.6
Tierschutzpartei					1,210	0.7	▼0.2
ÖDP	Sebastian Thumbach	966	0.7	▼0.3	576	0.4	▼0.2
Volt					520	0.3	▲0.2
PARTEI					504	0.3	▼0.3
BP					222	0.1	▼0.3
BD					109	0.1	
Humanists					82	0.1	0.0
MLPD					20	0.0	0.0
Informal votes		639			524		
Total valid votes		162,644			162,759		
Turnout		164,283	84.9	▲4.7			
CSU hold	Majority	38,380	23.6	▲1.7			

=== 2021 election ===
Federal election (2021): Donau-Ries
Notes:	Blue background denotes the winner of the electorate vote. Pink background denotes a candidate elected from their party list. Yellow background denotes an electorate win by a list member, or other incumbent. A ✓ or ✗ denotes status of any incumbent, win or lose respectively.						
Party	Candidate	Votes	%	±%	Party votes	%	±%
CSU	✓ Ulrich Lange	64,045	41.1	▼6.0	54,929	35.2	▼8.2
SPD	Christoph Schmid	29,872	19.2	▲1.2	25,784	16.5	▲2.7
AfD	Edeltraud Schwarz	15,723	10.1	▼2.7	17,135	11.0	▼3.7
FW	Ulrich Reiner	14,834	9.5	▲4.3	14,973	9.6	▲6.1
Greens	Stefan Norder-Freiherr von Hauch	11,076	7.1	▲0.7	14,911	9.5	▲2.6
FDP	Marcus Schürdt	9,915	6.4	▲1.4	15,593	10.0	▲0.9
dieBasis	Dagmar Riesner	3,895	2.5		3,432	2.2	
Left	Manfred Seel	3,048	2.0	▼2.2	2,855	1.8	▼2.7
Tierschutzpartei					1,488	1.0	▲0.2
PARTEI					891	0.6	▲0.1
ÖDP	Dieter Feldmeier	1,420	0.9	▼0.4	868	0.6	▼0.2
BP					648	0.4	▼0.3
Pirates					627	0.4	▲0.1
V-Partei3	Kristin Burger	966	0.6		254	0.2	0.0
Unabhängige	Harald Gerke	836	0.5		496	0.3	
Team Todenhöfer					262	0.2	
Volt					206	0.1	
Gesundheitsforschung					184	0.1	0.0
NPD					176	0.1	▼0.3
Bündnis C					121	0.1	
LKR	Erich Zühlke	294	0.2		106	0.1	
The III. Path					94	0.1	
Humanists					78	0.0	
du.					70	0.0	
DKP					20	0.0	0.0
MLPD					14	0.0	0.0
Informal votes		1,109			818		
Total valid votes		155,924			156,215		
Turnout		157,033	80.2	▲2.7			
CSU hold	Majority	34,173	21.9	▼7.1			

=== 2017 election ===
Federal election (2017): Donau-Ries
Notes:	Blue background denotes the winner of the electorate vote. Pink background denotes a candidate elected from their party list. Yellow background denotes an electorate win by a list member, or other incumbent. A ✓ or ✗ denotes status of any incumbent, win or lose respectively.						
Party	Candidate	Votes	%	±%	Party votes	%	±%
CSU	✓ Ulrich Lange	68,770	47.0	▼13.7	63,638	43.3	▼12.2
SPD	Christoph Schmid	26,562	18.1	▲0.5	20,289	13.8	▼2.8
AfD	Rafael Hauptmann	18,799	12.8		21,585	14.7	▲10.5
Greens	Albert Riedelsheimer	9,436	6.4	▲0.1	10,102	6.9	▲0.9
FW	Stephan Stieglauer	7,379	5.0	▲0.9	5,093	3.5	▲0.4
FDP	Walter Lohner	7,321	5.0	▲2.6	13,440	9.2	▲4.7
Left	Manfred Seel	6,198	4.2	▼0.2	6,687	4.6	▲1.3
ÖDP	Johannes Thum	1,991	1.4	▼0.9	1,062	0.7	▼0.3
BP					1,060	0.7	▼0.2
PARTEI					640	0.4	
NPD					632	0.4	▼0.7
Pirates					499	0.3	▼1.2
V-Partei³					233	0.2	
Gesundheitsforschung					198	0.1	
DM					191	0.1	
DiB					130	0.1	
BGE					123	0.1	
MLPD					26	0.0	0.0
DKP					20	0.0	
BüSo					13	0.0	0.0
Informal votes		1,369			1,000		
Total valid votes		146,456			146,825		
Turnout		147,825	77.5	▲8.5			
CSU hold	Majority	42,208	28.9	▼14.0			

=== 2013 election ===
Federal election (2013): Donau-Ries
Notes:	Blue background denotes the winner of the electorate vote. Pink background denotes a candidate elected from their party list. Yellow background denotes an electorate win by a list member, or other incumbent. A ✓ or ✗ denotes status of any incumbent, win or lose respectively.						
Party	Candidate	Votes	%	±%	Party votes	%	±%
CSU	✓ Ulrich Lange	78,524	60.6	▲8.1	72,065	55.5	▲6.6
SPD	Gabriele Fograscher	22,858	17.7	▲1.7	21,616	16.7	▲2.8
Greens	Bettina Merkl-Zierer	8,153	6.3	▼1.3	7,773	6.0	▼1.7
Left	Manfred Seel	5,797	4.5	▼1.6	4,260	3.3	▼2.5
FW	Florian Riehl	5,371	4.1		3,964	3.1	
FDP	Heinz-Peter Liehr	3,170	2.4	▼9.2	5,824	4.5	▼10.1
AfD					5,433	4.2	
Pirates					1,938	1.5	▼0.1
ÖDP	Andreas Becker	2,899	2.2	▲0.7	1,312	1.0	0.0
NPD	Alexander Feyen	2,342	1.8	▼0.1	1,503	1.2	▼0.3
BP					1,144	0.9	▼0.2
REP					999	0.8	▼0.5
Tierschutzpartei					877	0.7	▲0.1
DIE FRAUEN					462	0.4	
DIE VIOLETTEN					214	0.2	▼0.2
Party of Reason					134	0.1	
RRP		381	0.3		121	0.1	▼0.5
PRO					81	0.1	
MLPD					26	0.0	0.0
BüSo					12	0.0	0.0
Informal votes		1,560			1,297		
Total valid votes		129,495			129,758		
Turnout		131,055	69.0	▼1.7			
CSU hold	Majority	55,666	42.9	▲6.2			

=== 2009 election ===
Federal election (2009): Donau-Ries
Notes:	Blue background denotes the winner of the electorate vote. Pink background denotes a candidate elected from their party list. Yellow background denotes an electorate win by a list member, or other incumbent. A ✓ or ✗ denotes status of any incumbent, win or lose respectively.						
Party	Candidate	Votes	%	±%	Party votes	%	±%
CSU	Ulrich Lange	69,102	52.6	▼8.1	64,647	48.9	▼8.0
SPD	Gabriele Fograscher	20,901	15.9	▼6.8	18,290	13.8	▼8.2
FDP	Uwe Pranghofer	15,337	11.7	▲5.5	19,314	14.6	▲6.3
Greens	Albert Riedelsheimer	9,962	7.6	▲1.9	10,139	7.7	▲2.5
Left	Manfred Seel	8,025	6.1	▲3.4	7,605	5.8	▲3.0
Pirates					2,170	1.6	
NPD	Alexander Feyen	2,549	1.9	▼0.2	1,919	1.5	▲0.1
REP					1,725	1.3	▼0.2
BP	Heinz Link	2,385	1.8		1,432	1.1	▲0.7
ÖDP	Walter Price	1,982	1.5		1,367	1.0	
FAMILIE					1,077	0.8	▲0.2
RRP					751	0.6	
Tierschutzpartei					703	0.5	
DIE VIOLETTEN	Liane Thorwart	888	0.7		495	0.4	
Independent	Siegfried Lemmermeier	297	0.2				
CM					182	0.1	
PBC					172	0.1	▼0.1
DVU					63	0.0	
BüSo					41	0.0	0.0
MLPD					30	0.0	0.0
Informal votes		2,191			1,497		
Total valid votes		131,428			132,122		
Turnout		133,619	70.7	▼7.8			
CSU hold	Majority	48,201	36.7	▼1.3			

=== 2005 election ===
Federal election (2005):Donau-Ries
Notes:	Blue background denotes the winner of the electorate vote. Pink background denotes a candidate elected from their party list. Yellow background denotes an electorate win by a list member, or other incumbent. A ✓ or ✗ denotes status of any incumbent, win or lose respectively.						
Party	Candidate	Votes	%	±%	Party votes	%	±%
CSU	✓ Hans Raidel	87,740	60.7	▼4.4	82,845	56.9	▼8.7
SPD	Gabriele Fograscher	32,778	22.7	▼0.9	32,077	22.0	▼1.0
FDP	Georg Barfuß	8,950	6.2	▲2.6	12,104	8.3	▲4.7
Greens	Dominik Ach	8,154	5.6	▲1.7	7,463	5.1	▲0.4
Left	Wolfgang Zenetti	3,883	2.7	▲2.7	3,960	2.7	▲2.3
NPD	Alexander Feyen	3,108	2.1		2,038	1.4	▲1.2
REP					2,170	1.5	▲0.5
Familie					958	0.7	
BP					623	0.4	▲0.3
Feminist					427	0.3	▲0.2
GRAUEN					380	0.3	▲0.2
PBC					311	0.2	▲0.1
BüSo					80	0.1	0.0
MLPD					68	0.0	
Informal votes		2,609			1,718		
Total valid votes		144,613			145,504		
Turnout		147,222	78.5	▼3.2			
CSU hold	Majority	54,962	38				
