= Wilhelm Niklas =

German politician (1887–1957)

Minister of Food, Agriculture and Forestry
- In office 20 September 1949 – 20 October 1953
- Chancellor: Konrad Adenauer
- Preceded by: Office established
- Succeeded by: Heinrich Lübke

Member of the Bundestag; for Donauwörth
- In office 30 May 1951 – 6 October 1953
- Preceded by: Martin Loibl
- Succeeded by: Philipp Meyer

Personal details
- Born: 24 September 1887 Traunstein, Germany
- Died: 12 April 1957 (aged 69) Munich, West Germany
- Party: Christian Social Union (1946–1957)
- Other political affiliations: BVP (before 1933)
- Education: TU Munich

Wilhelm Niklas (24 September 1887 – 12 April 1957) was a German academic and politician, who was the first minister of food, agriculture and forestry in Konrad Adenauer's first cabinet.

== Early life and education ==
Niklas was born in Traunstein, southern Bavaria, on 24 September 1887. He studied law and political science for two semesters, and then he studied agriculture and veterinary medicine. He graduated from the Technical University of Munich with a degree in veterinary medicine. In 1914, he received a PhD in veterinary science with the thesis "The development of the Bavarian cattle insurance office in the first 15 years of its existence".

== Career ==
Niklas began his career at his alma mater as a research assistant and worked there until 1912. Then he moved to state veterinary service. He was the department chief for livestock breeding and animal products in the Bavarian ministry of agriculture from 1925 until 1935 when he was fired by the Nazis. Then he dealt with the management of large estates, and bought and ran a farm in southern Bavaria. He was a member of the Bavarian People's Party before 1933. From 1945 to 1947 he was the state secretary at the Bavarian ministry of food, agriculture and forestry. He was a member of the Christian Social Union in Bavaria (CSU) which he joined in 1946. From 1947 to 1949 he served as the deputy director of the department for food, agriculture and forestry at the united economic area. He was also an academic and became professor at the Veterinary Faculty of the Ludwig-Maximilians-Universität München in 1947.

From 1948 to 1949, he was the deputy director of the Bizonal food and agriculture administration. He served as the minister of food, agriculture and forestry in the cabinet led by Konrad Adenauer. Niklas was in office from 20 September 1949 to 20 October 1953. He was replaced by Heinrich Lübke in the post. In a May 1951 by-election in Bavaria, he was elected to the Bundestag.

== Personal life and death ==
Niklas was a Catholic. He died in Munich on 12 April 1957 due to complications following a car accident.

== Legacy ==
The federal ministry of agriculture has been awarding "Professor-Niklas-Medal” for his memory. It is the highest award given by the ministry.
