= Masters W60 javelin 400g world record progression =

Masters W60 javelin world record progression is the progression of world record improvements of the javelin throw W60 division of Masters athletics. Records must be set in properly conducted, official competitions under the standing IAAF rules unless modified by World Masters Athletics. The W60 division consists of female athletes who have reached the age of 60 but have not yet reached the age of 65, so exactly from their 60th birthday to the day before their 65th birthday. The W60 division threw the 400g javelin until the end of 2013. Since 2014, the W60 division throws a 500 g implement. These are the records for the 400g javelin. WMA discontinued this weight after the end of 2013. The records will be officially recognized along with 500g records until the lighter weight mark is surpassed. Gertraud Schönauer has held the record for 400g since 1997 and will likely hold it in perpetuity since the event is no longer contested.

Key

Incomplete information Pending

Distance	Athlete	Nationality	Birthdate	Location	Date
41.28	Gertraud Schönauer	Austria	27.02.1937	Dasing	12.07.1997
