= Theodor Körner =

Theodor Körner may refer to:

- Theodor Körner (author) (1791–1813), German poet and soldier
  - Theodor Körner (opera), premiered in 1872, based on an episode in the life of the German poet and soldier
  - Theodor Körner (film), a 1932 German film directed by Carl Boese
- Theodor Körner (German politician) (1941—2018), German administrative lawyer and local politician
- Theodor Körner (Austrian politician) (1873–1957), president of Austria 1951–1957
  - Theodor Körner Prize, a set of annual Austrian awards
- Theodor Christian Körner (1863–1933), German merchant and politician
