= Petersdorf, Bavaria =

Petersdorf
- Municipality
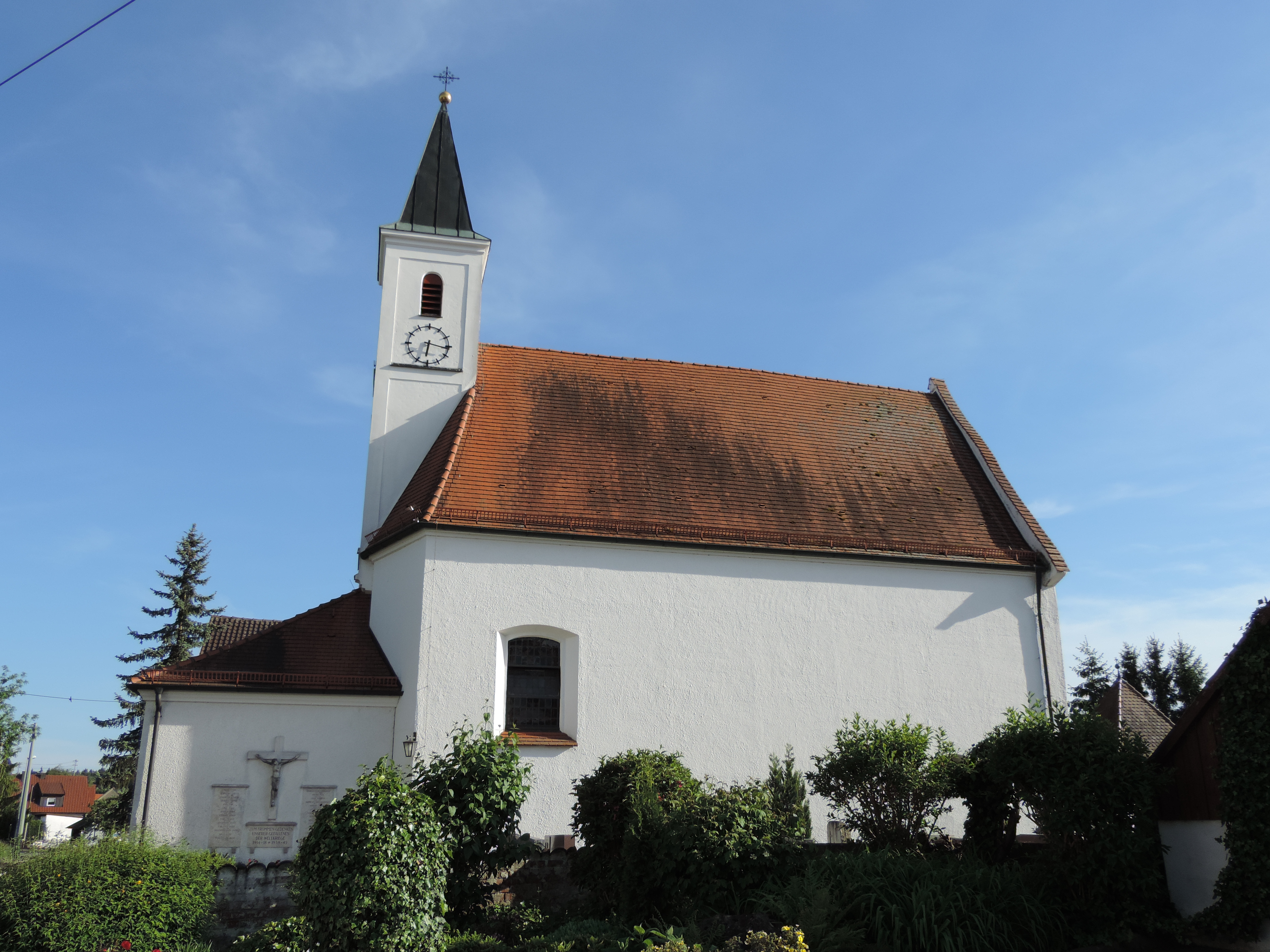
- Church of Saint Nicholas

- Coat of arms

- Location of Petersdorf within Aichach-Friedberg district
- Interactive map of Petersdorf
- Location within Germany Location within Bavaria
- Coordinates: 48°31′N 11°2′E
- Country: Germany
- State: Bavaria
- Admin. region: Schwaben
- District: Aichach-Friedberg
- Municipal assoc.: Aindling

Government
  - Mayor (2023–29): Dietrich Binder

Area
  - Total: 19.51 km^{2} (7.53 sq mi)
- Elevation: 461 m (1,512 ft)

Population (2025-12-31)
  - Total: 1,744
  - Density: 89.39/km^{2} (231.5/sq mi)
- Time zone: UTC+01:00 (CET)
  - Summer (DST): UTC+02:00 (CEST)
- Postal codes: 86574
- Dialling codes: 08237
- Vehicle registration: AIC
- Website: www.petersdorf.de

Petersdorf is a municipality in the district of Aichach-Friedberg in Bavaria in Germany.
