= Lechrain =

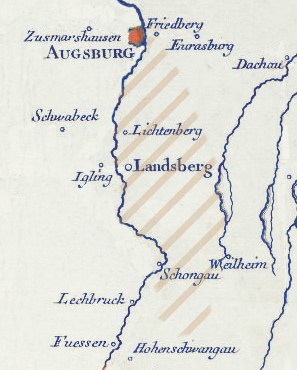
- Approximate area (shaded)

- Location in Germany
- Coordinates: 48.050°N 10.878°E
- Country: Germany

Lechrain (German pronunciation: [ˈlɛçʁaɪn]) is the name of an informally defined region of Germany extending southwards from Augsburg towards the foothills of the Alps along the Lech river, mainly on the east bank. It forms a boundary region between Bavaria and Swabia. The Lechrainer dialect has traces of Bavarian and Alemannic and is considered a transitional dialect.

== Geography ==
The name "Lechrain" includes the Old High German "rein", indicating a borderland, in this case between Bavaria and Swabia. It stretches from the foothills of the Alps into the Danube valley. The main settlements are Kempten, Füssen, Kaufbeuren, Peiting, Schongau, Landsberg am Lech, Augsburg, Friedberg, Mering and Donauwörth.

== History ==
Before the Christian era the land was occupied by Celts, then by Romans and later by Alemanni and Bavarians. Under the Romans it was the province of "Raetia II". In the 8th century it lay on the border between Bavaria and Swabia in the Merovingian and Carolingian periods. It was then occupied by Guelphs, Hohenstaufens and from the 13th century, the Wittelsbach dynasty. The land was always disputed between Bavaria and the Swabian imperial city of Augsburg. In the 19th century, when Augsburg and east Swabia were incorporated in Bavaria it lost its political meaning, but it retains a distinctive culture.
