= Adelzhausen =

- Municipality
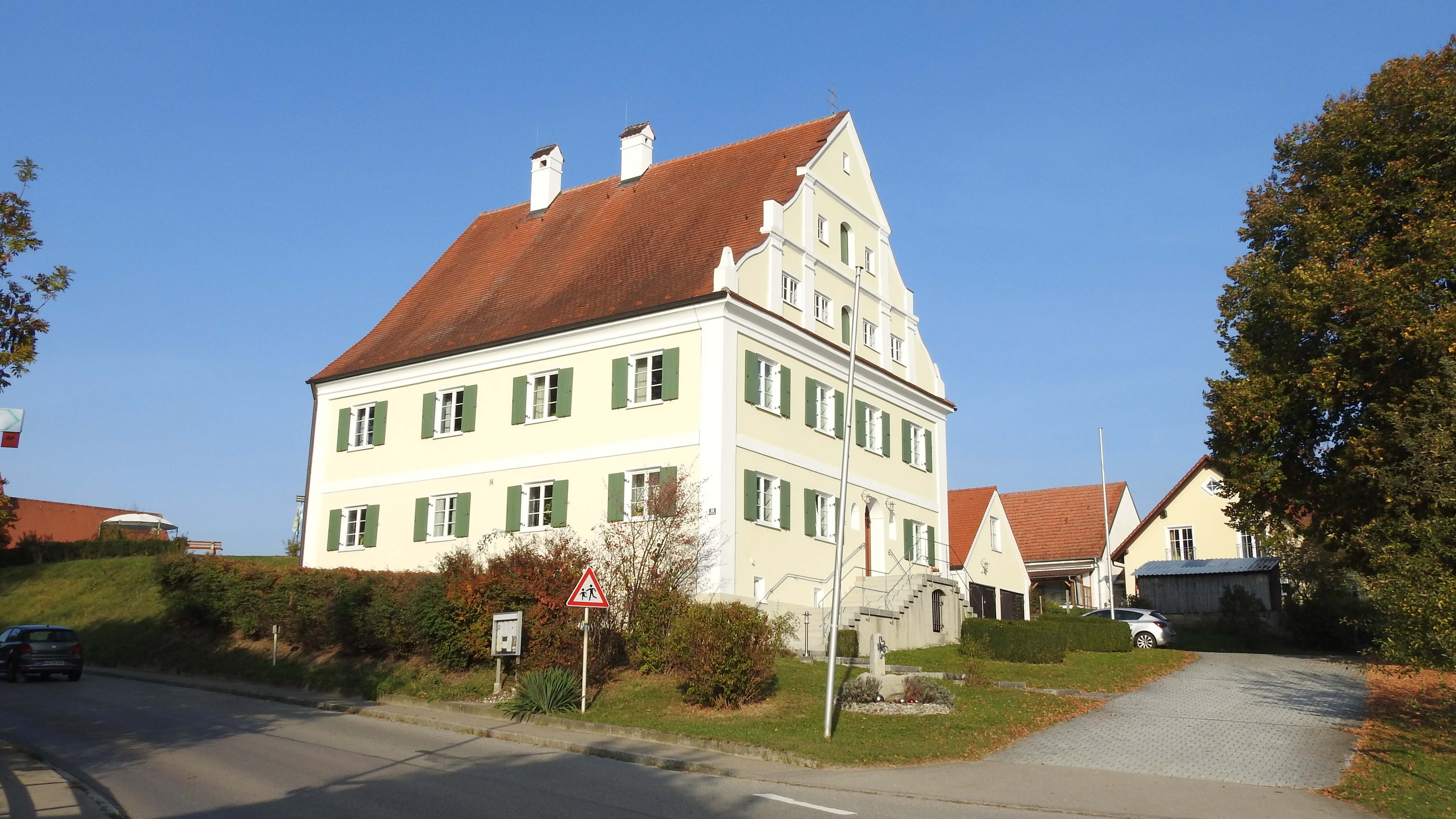
- Rectory in Adelzhausen

- Coat of arms

- Location of Adelzhausen within Aichach-Friedberg district
- Interactive map of Adelzhausen
- Location within Germany Location within Bavaria
- Coordinates: 48°21′N 11°8′E
- Country: Germany
- State: Bavaria
- Admin. region: Schwaben
- District: Aichach-Friedberg
- Municipal assoc.: Dasing

Government
  - Mayor (2020–26): Lorenz Braun (Ind.)

Area
  - Total: 16.97 km^{2} (6.55 sq mi)
- Elevation: 492 m (1,614 ft)

Population (2025-12-31)
  - Total: 1,875
  - Density: 110.5/km^{2} (286.2/sq mi)
- Time zone: UTC+01:00 (CET)
  - Summer (DST): UTC+02:00 (CEST)
- Postal codes: 86559
- Dialling codes: 08258
- Vehicle registration: AIC
- Website: www.adelzhausen.de

Adelzhausen is a municipality in Aichach-Friedberg district, in Bavaria, southern Germany.

The municipality covers an area of 16.97 km². The population density of the community is 89 inhabitants per km².
