= Mering (Verwaltungsgemeinschaft) =

- Verwaltungsgemeinschaft
- Location of Mering within Aichach-Friedberg district
- Interactive map of Mering
- Location within Germany Location within Bavaria
- Coordinates: 48°16′N 10°59′E
- Country: Germany
- State: Bavaria
- Admin. region: Swabia
- District: Aichach-Friedberg
- Seat: Mering
- Subdivisions: 3 municipalities

Area
  - Total: 56.53 km^{2} (21.83 sq mi)

Population (2025-12-31)
  - Total: 17,778
  - Density: 314.5/km^{2} (814.5/sq mi)
- Time zone: UTC+01:00 (CET)
  - Summer (DST): UTC+02:00 (CEST)
- Website: www.vg-mering.de

Mering is a Verwaltungsgemeinschaft (municipal association) in the district of Aichach-Friedberg in Bavaria, Germany. Its seat is in Mering.

It consists of the following municipalities:

1. Mering
2. Schmiechen
3. Steindorf
