= Todtenweis =

- Municipality
- Coat of arms

- Location of Todtenweis within Aichach-Friedberg district
- Interactive map of Todtenweis
- Location within Germany Location within Bavaria
- Coordinates: 48°31′N 10°56′E
- Country: Germany
- State: Bavaria
- Admin. region: Schwaben
- District: Aichach-Friedberg
- Municipal assoc.: Aindling

Government
  - Mayor (2020–26): Konrad Carl

Area
  - Total: 20.28 km^{2} (7.83 sq mi)
- Elevation: 448 m (1,470 ft)

Population (2025-12-31)
  - Total: 1,508
  - Density: 74.36/km^{2} (192.6/sq mi)
- Time zone: UTC+01:00 (CET)
  - Summer (DST): UTC+02:00 (CEST)
- Postal codes: 86447
- Dialling codes: 08237
- Vehicle registration: AIC
- Website: www.todtenweis.de

Todtenweis is a municipality in the district of Aichach-Friedberg in Bavaria in Germany.

Todtenweis is just east of the lake Aindlinger Baggersee.
