= Steindorf =

- Municipality
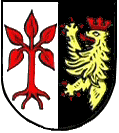
- Coat of arms

- Location of Steindorf within Aichach-Friedberg district
- Interactive map of Steindorf
- Location within Germany Location within Bavaria
- Coordinates: 48°13′N 11°0′E
- Country: Germany
- State: Bavaria
- Admin. region: Schwaben
- District: Aichach-Friedberg
- Municipal assoc.: Mering

Government
  - Mayor (2020–26): Paul Wecker

Area
  - Total: 16.19 km^{2} (6.25 sq mi)
- Elevation: 538 m (1,765 ft)

Population (2025-12-31)
  - Total: 988
  - Density: 61.0/km^{2} (158/sq mi)
- Time zone: UTC+01:00 (CET)
  - Summer (DST): UTC+02:00 (CEST)
- Postal codes: 82297
- Dialling codes: 08202
- Vehicle registration: AIC
- Website: www.steindorf-online.de

Steindorf is a municipality in the district of Aichach-Friedberg in Bavaria in Germany.
