= Schmiechen =

- Municipality
- Coat of arms

- Location of Schmiechen within Aichach-Friedberg district
- Interactive map of Schmiechen
- Location within Germany Location within Bavaria
- Coordinates: 48°13′N 10°58′E
- Country: Germany
- State: Bavaria
- Admin. region: Schwaben
- District: Aichach-Friedberg
- Municipal assoc.: Mering

Government
  - Mayor (2020–26): Josef Wecker

Area
  - Total: 13.50 km^{2} (5.21 sq mi)
- Elevation: 540 m (1,770 ft)

Population (2025-12-31)
  - Total: 1,461
  - Density: 108.2/km^{2} (280.3/sq mi)
- Time zone: UTC+01:00 (CET)
  - Summer (DST): UTC+02:00 (CEST)
- Postal codes: 86511
- Dialling codes: 08206
- Vehicle registration: AIC
- Website: www.schmiechen.de

Schmiechen is a municipality in the district of Aichach-Friedberg in Bavaria in Germany.
