= Aindlinger Baggersee =

Lake in Bavaria, Germany

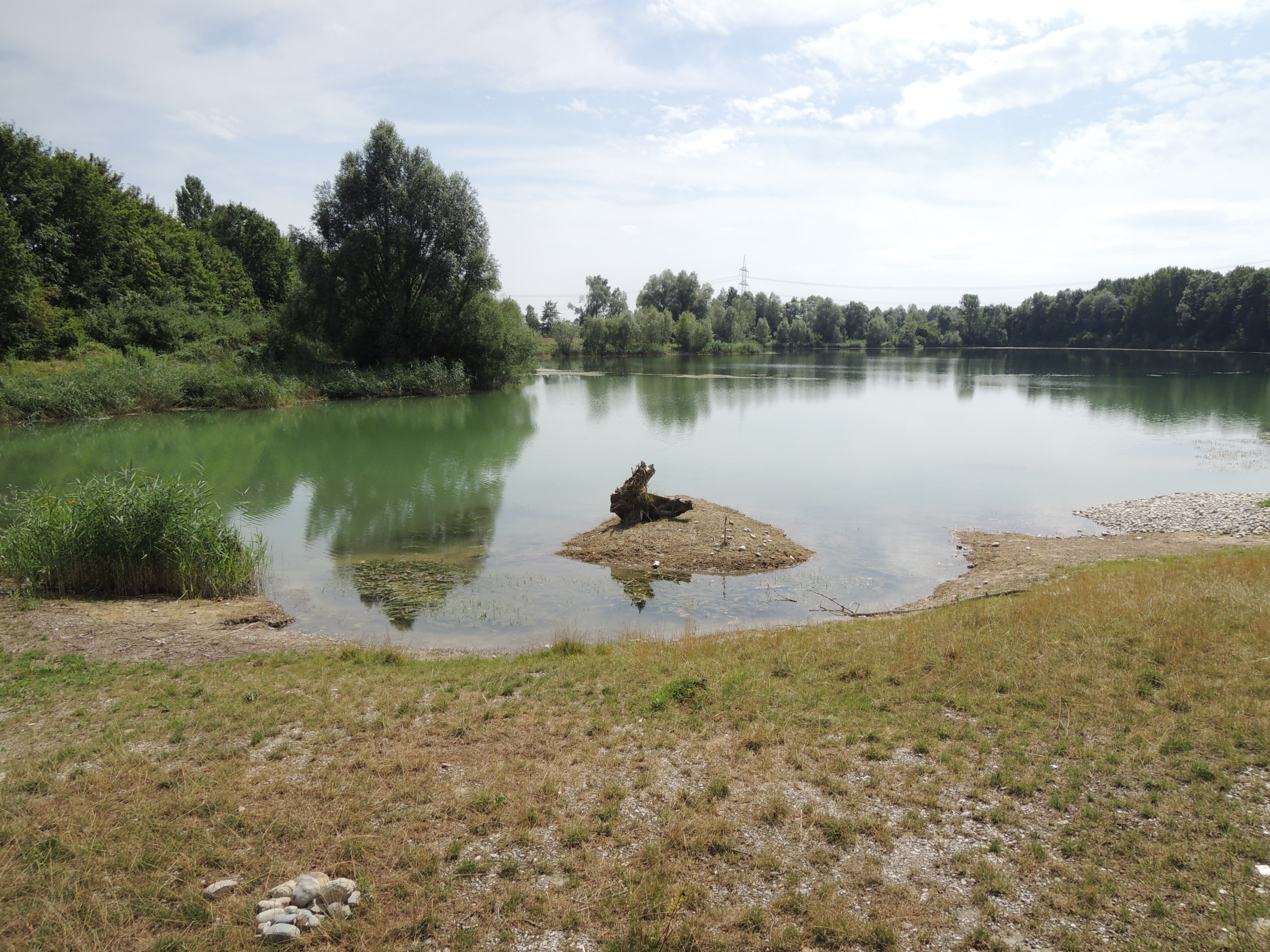

- Location within Bavaria
- Location: Swabia, Bavaria
- Coordinates: 48°31′4.38″N 10°52′59.38″E
- Primary inflows: groundwater, precipitation
- Primary outflows: groundwater
- Basin countries: Germany
- Max. length: ca. 350 m (1,150 ft)
- Max. width: 370 m (1,210 ft)
- Surface area: 9 ha (22 acres)
- Surface elevation: 434 m (1,424 ft)
- Settlements: Todtenweis

Aindlinger Baggersee is a lake in Swabia, Bavaria, Germany. At an elevation of 434 m, its surface area is 9 ha. It is just west of the town Todtenweis.
