= Ulrich Lange (politician) =

German politician (born 1969)

Ulrich Lange MdB
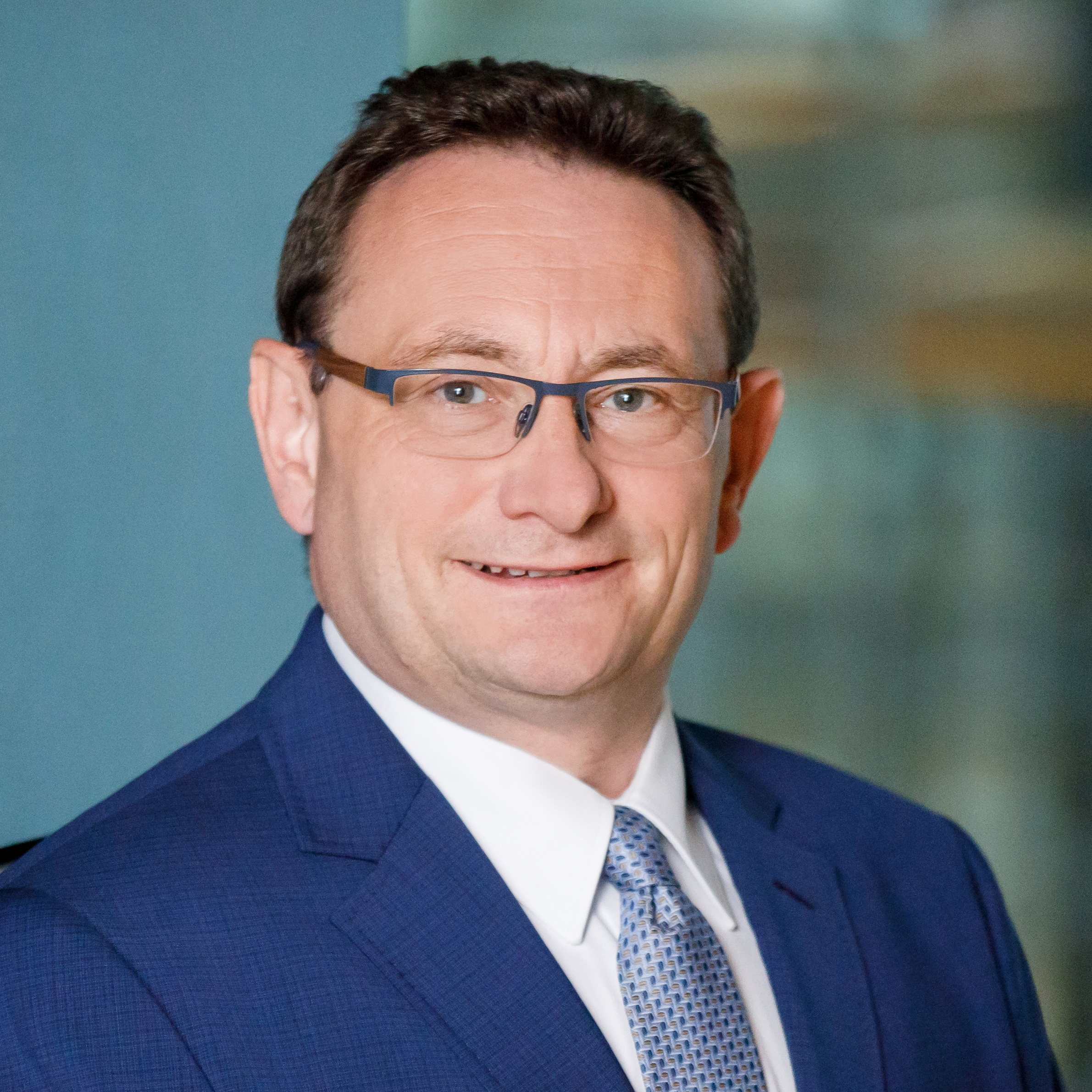
- Lange in 2018

Member of the Bundestag; for Donau-Ries
- Incumbent
- Assumed office 27 October 2009
- Preceded by: Hans Raidel

Personal details
- Born: 6 June 1969 (age 57) Merano, Italy
- Party: Christian Social Union
- Children: 2
- Education: University of Regensburg

Ulrich Lange (born 6 June 1969) is a German lawyer and politician of the Christian Social Union in Bavaria (CSU) who has been serving as a member of the Bundestag from the state of Bavaria since 2009.

In addition to his work in parliament, Lange was nominated as Parliamentary State Secretary at the Federal Ministry for Transport in the government of Chancellor Friedrich Merz in 2025.

== Political career ==
Born in Meran, Lange became a member of the Bundestag in the 2009 German federal election, representing the Donau-Ries constituency. In parliament, he served on Committee on Economic Affairs and Technology (2009–2013), the Committee on Labour and Social Affairs (2009–2013) and the Committee on Transport (2009–2017). From 2014 until 2017, he was his parliamentary group’s spokesperson on transport.

In the negotiations to form a coalition government under the leadership of Chancellor Angela Merkel following the 2017 federal elections, Lange was part of the working group on transport and infrastructure, led by Michael Kretschmer, Alexander Dobrindt and Sören Bartol. Since early 2018, he has been serving as deputy chairman of the CDU/CSU parliamentary group, under the leadership of successive chairmen Volker Kauder (2018) and Ralph Brinkhaus (2018–2022) and Friedrich Merz (2022–present).

== Other activities ==
- Augsburg University of Applied Sciences, Member of the Board of Trustees
- Federal Network Agency for Electricity, Gas, Telecommunications, Posts and Railway (BNetzA), Alternate Member of the Rail Infrastructure Advisory Council (since 2014)
- Deutsche Flugsicherung (DFS), Member of the Advisory Board (2014–2018)
