= Philipp Meyer (politician) =

German politician

Member of the Bundestag; for Donauwörth
- In office 6 October 1953 – 29 January 1962
- Preceded by: Wilhelm Niklas
- Succeeded by: Friedrich Winter

Personal details
- Born: 29 March 1896 Auhausen, Germany
- Died: 29 January 1962 (aged 65)
- Party: Christian Social Union (1945–1962)
- Other political affiliations: Nazi Party (1932–1945)
- Occupation: Miller and farmer

Philipp Meyer (29 March 1896 – 29 January 1962) was a German politician who held the position of a Kreisleiter in the Nazi Party from 1932 to 1945. He was sentenced to death at end of the Second World War for refusing to evacuate his district and prepare it for defense, but was spared. In post-war West Germany he was a member of the Bundestag, the federal parliament, from 1953 until his death.

== Biography ==
Meyer was born in Auhausen in 1896 in what was than the Kingdom of Bavaria, part of the German Empire. He worked as a miller and farmer, joining the Nazi Party and rising to the office of Kreisleiter, the fourth tier of the Nazi hierarchy, set below the Gauleiter. In his position Meyer was answerable to Karl Wahl, Gauleiter in the Swabia. Living in Oppertshofen at the end of the Second World War, Meyer was sentenced to death by a SS drumhead court-martial for refusing to evacuate his district of Donauwörth and prepare it for defense. He was however spared from execution.

In post-war West Germany, in 1949, Meyer became the head of the Bavarian association of millers and also the head of the district association of master craftsmen. He became a candidate for the conservative CSU party for the German Bundestag in 1953 and became the first former Nazi Kreisleiter to be elected to the parliament. He was successfully reelected in his electorate of Donauwörth in 1957 and 1961. Meyer died on 29 January 1962 after a long illness. He was succeed in his seat by Karl Heinz Lemmrich in 1965, who remained a member of the Bundestag for the seat of Donauwörth for the next 27 years, until 1988.
