= Ingolstadt–Augsburg-Hochzoll railway =

German railway

Ingolstadt–Augsburg railway
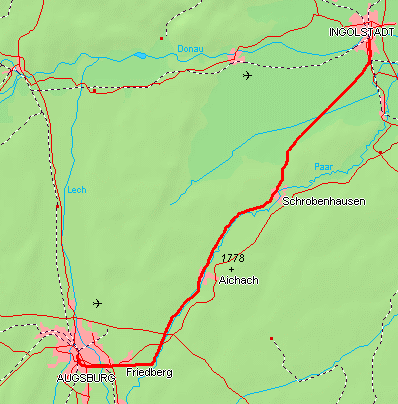

Overview
- Other name(s): Paar Valley Railway
- Native name: Paartalbahn
- Status: Operational
- Owner: DB Netz
- Line number: 5382
- Locale: Bavaria
- Termini: Ingolstadt; Augsburg
- Stations: 12

Service
- Type: Heavy rail, Passenger rail Regional rail
- Route number: 983
- Operator(s): Bayerische Regiobahn

History
- Opened: 15 May 1875

Technical
- Line length: 62.957 km (39.1 mi)
- Number of tracks: Single track (2: Ingolstadt Hbf–Ingolstadt-Seehof)
- Track gauge: 1,435 mm (4 ft 8 1/2 in) standard gauge
- Operating speed: 130 km/h (80.8 mph)

The Ingolstadt–Augsburg-Hochzoll railway (also known as the Paartalbahn, German for "Paar Valley Railway") is a railway that runs for part of its way through the Paar Valley between Augsburg-Hochzoll and Ingolstadt via Friedberg, Dasing, Aichach and Schrobenhausen. This single-tracked, unelectrified main line is 63 km long and has timetable no. KBS 983.

== History ==
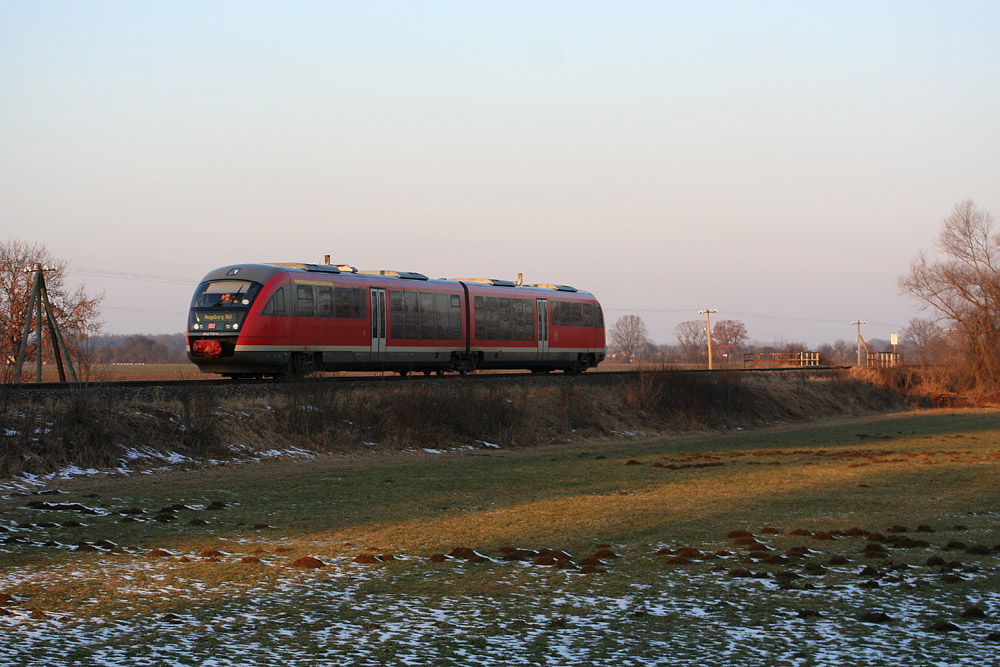
A Regionalbahn train on the Paar Valley Railway near Niederarnbach

The line was built between 1872 and 1875 and opened on 15 May 1875. Plans around the turn of the century for a further link from Pöttmes and Eurasburg were not put into action. Likewise, despite a lot of discussion, nothing came of the idea for a link line from Aichach on the Paar Valley Railway to the terminus at Altomünster of the branch line made famous by Ludwig Thoma (today S-Bahn Line A in the MVV network), which would have provided a direct connexion to the Munich S-Bahn network. In the winter of 1922, service was closed from time to time due to the lack of coal.

In 1935, railbuses were used for the first time between Augsburg and Aichach. During the Second World War, the line was also used for military purposes. In early 1945, operations came to a standstill however after a bridge over the Paar had been blown up. Despite that, the line was able to be opened again on 1 January 1946.

During the course of the 1960s, the number of passengers dwindled due to the increase in private motor vehicles and in 1975 a closure of the line was discussed for the first time. Whilst that came to nothing, in the years that followed several halts were closed and service was reduced.

In 1989, the line between Augsburg and Radersdorf was incorporated into the Augsburger Verkehrsverbund (AVV) and, in 1996, services were increased with the introduction of the Bavaria-Takt, a new system of fixed-interval services. At that time, DB Class 628 multiples and locomotive-hauled push-pull trains were mainly used. In 1999, the maximum speed limit on the line was raised to 120 km/h.

DB Cargo ended freight operations on the line at the end of 2000. Augsburger Localbahn re-established freight operations on the line in early July 2002.

The daily number of passengers rose from 4950 to 8500 from 2008 to 2012. 1.3 million train-kilometres were operated in local passenger traffic in 2014.

Passenger operations on the Paar Valley Railway were taken over by the Bayerische Regiobahn owned by Veolia Verkehr from the timetable change in 2009 after it had won the tender from the Bayerische Eisenbahngesellschaft. At the same time, a rail service was introduced, operating at 15-minute intervals between Augsburg and Friedberg, continuing at 30-minute intervals to Aichach.

The BEG extended the Bayerische Regiobahn contract under a transitional contract, Dieselnetz Augsburg II (Augsburg II diesel network), including the operation on the Paar Valley Railway for the period from December 2019 to December 2021. In 2018, the BEG awarded the contract for operation of the line from December 2022 to December 2031 to Bayerische Regiobahn as part of lot 2 of the Augsburger Netze.

== Services ==
Since the timetable change in 2009, the route has been operated with LINT 41 diesel railcars, before that it was worked by DBAG Class 642 multiples.

There is no regular, through goods traffic at present. However, during the week a short, northern section of the line from Ingolstadt is served by a transhipment train from Railion, because a haulage company is based in Karlskron-Probfeld, which runs a large car storage operation. In addition from August 2002 the line was sometimes worked by oil trains from Ingolstadt to Kempten (Allgäu) hauled by engines from the Augsburg Localbahn.

Since July 2007 goods traffic has returned between Augsburg and Radersdorf. The sawmill of Anton Heggenstaller based in Unterbernbach has refurbished its siding and loading area, so that regular wood trains from the Augsburg Localbahn and other private railway companies, like the OHE may be seen.

== Future ==
The following projects are under discussion to make the Paar Valley Railway more attractive in the future as part of the planned Regio-Schienen-Takt Augsburg (Augsburg regional cyclical rail service):

- Reopening of the station at Paar or a new station and crossing loop in Paar
- Extension of the trains to Brunnen (opened in December 2019)
- Extension of the trains to Augsburg-Oberhausen
- Electrification and upgrading of the line for 160 km/h
