= Schiltberg =

- Municipality
- Coat of arms

- Location of Schiltberg within Aichach-Friedberg district
- Interactive map of Schiltberg
- Location within Germany Location within Bavaria
- Coordinates: 48°28′N 11°14′E
- Country: Germany
- State: Bavaria
- Admin. region: Schwaben
- District: Aichach-Friedberg
- Municipal assoc.: Kühbach

Government
  - Mayor (2022–28): Peter Kellerer

Area
  - Total: 16.97 km^{2} (6.55 sq mi)
- Elevation: 455 m (1,493 ft)

Population (2025-12-31)
  - Total: 1,956
  - Density: 115.3/km^{2} (298.5/sq mi)
- Time zone: UTC+01:00 (CET)
  - Summer (DST): UTC+02:00 (CEST)
- Postal codes: 86576
- Dialling codes: 08259
- Vehicle registration: AIC
- Website: www.schiltberg.de

Schiltberg is a municipality in the district of Aichach-Friedberg in Bavaria in Germany.
