= Wittelsbach Castle =

Coordinates: 48°28′6.96″N 11°10′34.32″E

- Interactive map of the Wittelsbach Castle area

General information
- Type: Castle
- Location: Germany

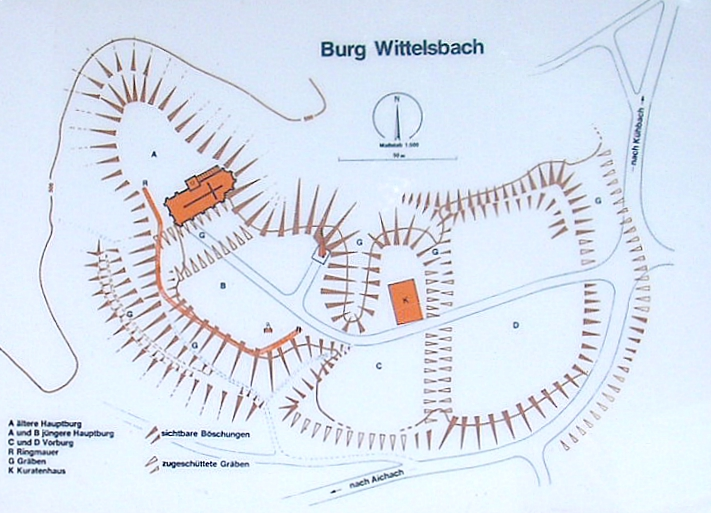
A schematic plan of the former castle

Wittelsbach Castle (German: Burg Wittelsbach) was a castle near Aichach in today's Bavarian Swabia.

The castle was first mentioned around the year 1000. In 1119, Otto IV, Count of Scheyern moved into the castle of Wittelsbach and converted his previous seat into Scheyern Abbey. The castle's name, "Witilinesbac", is however already mentioned as the place of origin of Otto IV in a document by Henry V dating from 1115. From 1120, the Counts of Scheyern were Counts Palatine of Wittelsbach. The castle thus became the ancestral seat of the House of Wittelsbach, the later Electors and Kings of Bavaria and Electors of the Palatinate.

According to local tradition, the castle was destroyed in 1209 after Count Otto of Wittelsbach murdered King Philip of Swabia, and it was not rebuilt. An archaeological excavation undertaken from 1978 to 1980 found no evidence of a sudden destruction of the castle, however. From the archaeological evidence, it appears the castle's walls were used as a quarry after the castle itself was abandoned.

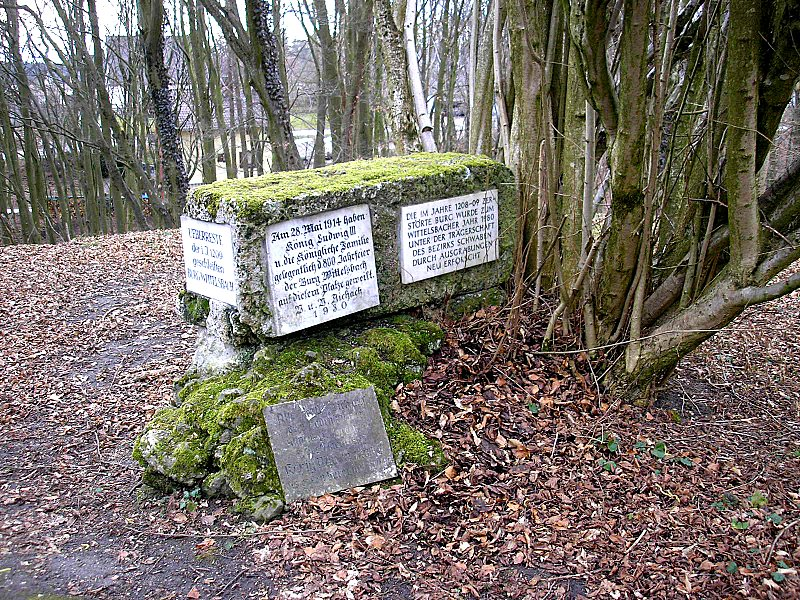
Memorial stone on the former site of Wittelsbach Castle

In the 15th century, the Gothic church Beatae Mariae Virginis was built on the former castle site. The church, still standing today, became the nucleus of the village of Oberwittelsbach (Upper Wittelsbach). In 1834, the Wittelsbach family erected a monument on the site of their former castle. In memory of the castle, parts of the district Aichach-Friedberg are today called Wittelsbacher country.

In 1838 Duke Maximilian Joseph in Bavaria, the father of Empress Elisabeth of Austria, acquired a castle in the nearby village of Unterwittelsbach (Lower Wittelsbach), built in 1537 on the site of another, older castle dating from the Middle Ages; it remained in the possession of the junior ducal branch (named Dukes in Bavaria) of the royal House of Wittelsbach until 1955 and now houses a museum devoted to Empress Elisabeth.

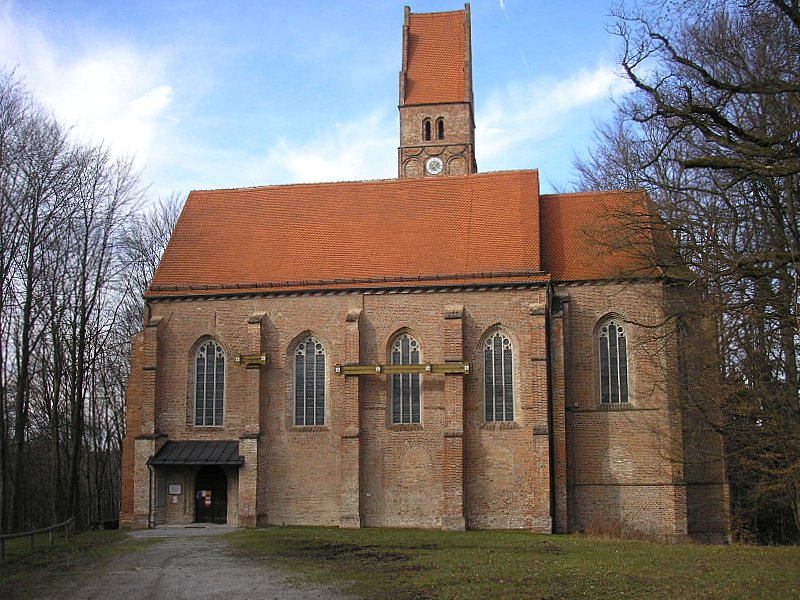
The 15th century church Beatae Mariae Virginis

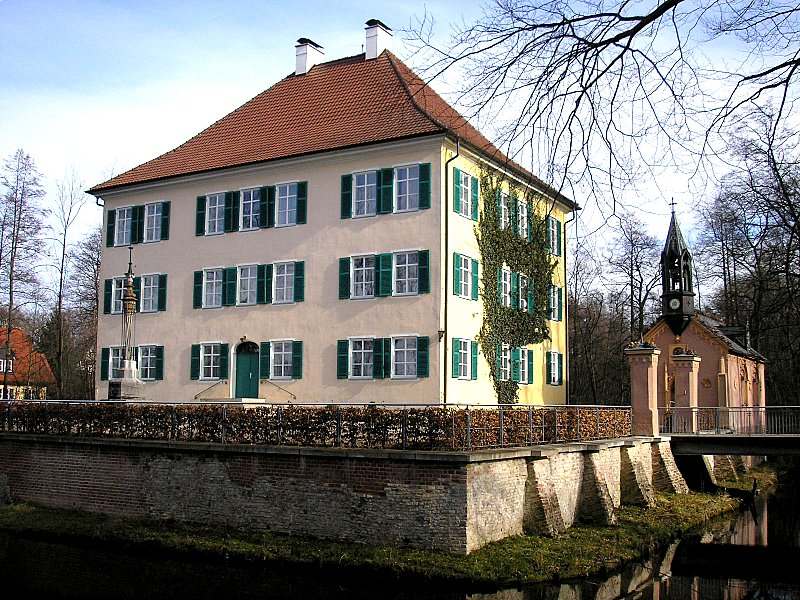
Unterwittelsbach Castle
