= Baar, Bavaria =

Baar
- Municipality
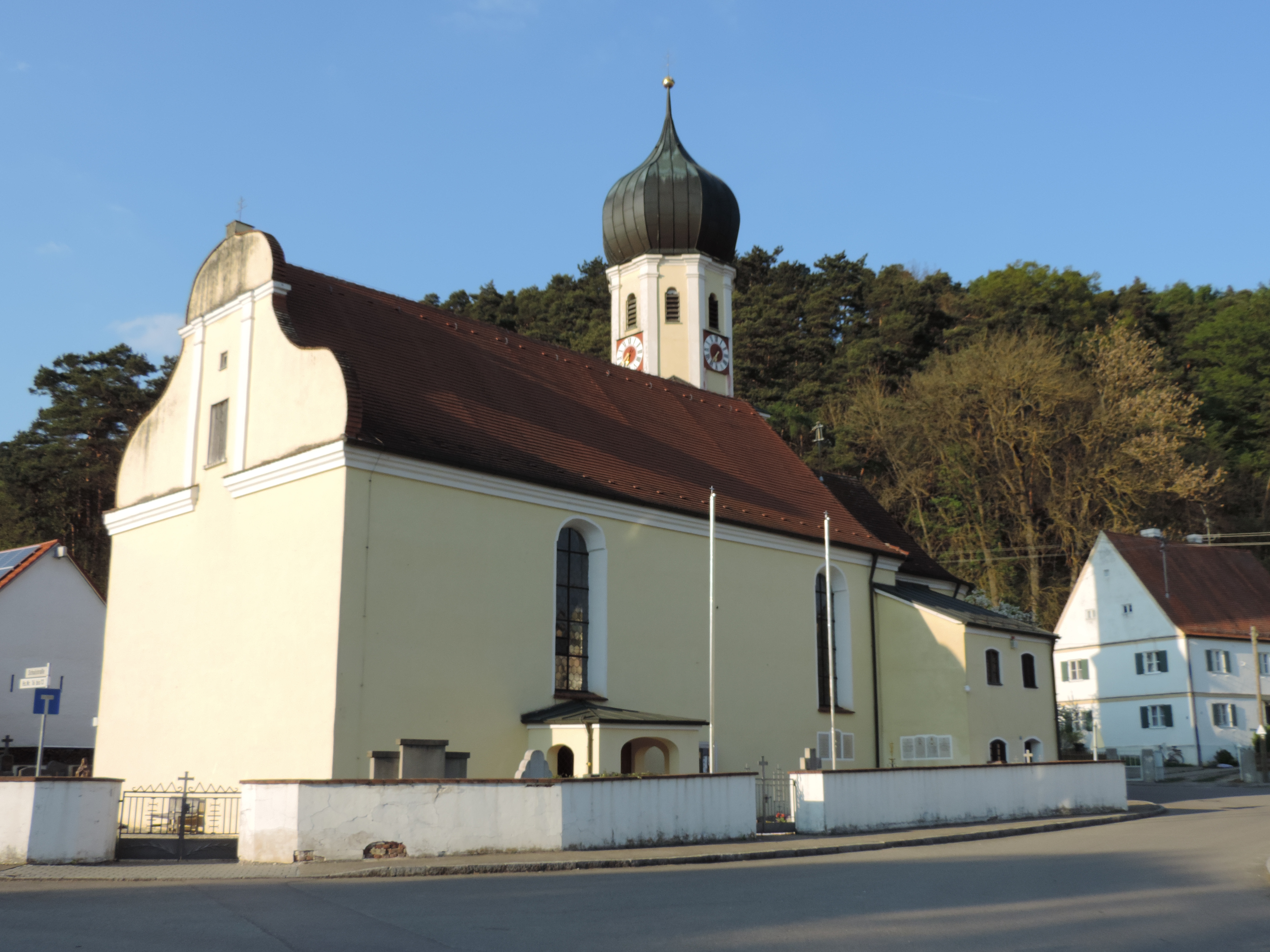
- Church of Saint Lawrence in Oberbaar

- Coat of arms

- Location of Baar within Aichach-Friedberg district
- Interactive map of Baar
- Location within Germany Location within Bavaria
- Coordinates: 48°34′N 10°58′E
- Country: Germany
- State: Bavaria
- Admin. region: Schwaben
- District: Aichach-Friedberg
- Municipal assoc.: Pöttmes

Government
  - Mayor (2020–26): Roman Pekis

Area
  - Total: 16.9 km^{2} (6.5 sq mi)
- Elevation: 430 m (1,410 ft)

Population (2025-12-31)
  - Total: 1,260
  - Density: 74.6/km^{2} (193/sq mi)
- Time zone: UTC+01:00 (CET)
  - Summer (DST): UTC+02:00 (CEST)
- Postal codes: 86674
- Dialling codes: 08276
- Vehicle registration: AIC
- Website: www.baar-schwaben.de

Baar (German pronunciation: [baːɐ̯]) is a municipality in Aichach-Friedberg district, in Bavaria, southern Germany.

The municipality covers an area of 16.94 km^{2}. Of the total population of 589 are male, and 580 are female (Dec 31, 2003). The population density of the community is 68 inhabitants per km^{2}.
