= Sielenbach =

- Municipality
- Coat of arms

- Location of Sielenbach within Aichach-Friedberg district
- Interactive map of Sielenbach
- Location within Germany Location within Bavaria
- Coordinates: 48°24′N 11°10′E
- Country: Germany
- State: Bavaria
- Admin. region: Schwaben
- District: Aichach-Friedberg
- Municipal assoc.: Dasing

Government
  - Mayor (2020–26): Heinz Geiling

Area
  - Total: 17.87 km^{2} (6.90 sq mi)
- Elevation: 470 m (1,540 ft)

Population (2025-12-31)
  - Total: 1,872
  - Density: 104.8/km^{2} (271.3/sq mi)
- Time zone: UTC+01:00 (CET)
  - Summer (DST): UTC+02:00 (CEST)
- Postal codes: 86577
- Dialling codes: 08258
- Vehicle registration: AIC
- Website: www.sielenbach.de

Sielenbach is a municipality in the district of Aichach-Friedberg in Bavaria in Germany.

== Partner cities ==
- Saint-Fraimbault-de-Prières, France, since 1992
