= Aindling (Verwaltungsgemeinschaft) =

- Verwaltungsgemeinschaft
- Location of Aindling within Aichach-Friedberg district
- Interactive map of Aindling
- Location within Germany Location within Bavaria
- Coordinates: 48°31′N 10°57′E
- Country: Germany
- State: Bavaria
- Admin. region: Swabia
- District: Aichach-Friedberg
- Seat: Aindling
- Subdivisions: 3 municipalities

Area
  - Total: 71.12 km^{2} (27.46 sq mi)

Population (2025-12-31)
  - Total: 7,946
  - Density: 111.7/km^{2} (289.4/sq mi)
- Time zone: UTC+01:00 (CET)
  - Summer (DST): UTC+02:00 (CEST)
- Website: www.vg-aindling.de

Aindling is a Verwaltungsgemeinschaft (municipal association) in the district of Aichach-Friedberg in Bavaria, Germany. Its seat is in Aindling.

It consists of the following municipalities:

1. Aindling
2. Petersdorf
3. Todtenweis
