= Pöttmes (Verwaltungsgemeinschaft) =

- Verwaltungsgemeinschaft
- Location of Pöttmes within Aichach-Friedberg district
- Interactive map of Pöttmes
- Location within Germany Location within Bavaria
- Coordinates: 48°35′N 11°06′E
- Country: Germany
- State: Bavaria
- Admin. region: Swabia
- District: Aichach-Friedberg
- Seat: Pöttmes
- Subdivisions: 2 municipalities

Area
  - Total: 99.49 km^{2} (38.41 sq mi)

Population (2025-12-31)
  - Total: 8,312
  - Density: 83.55/km^{2} (216.4/sq mi)
- Time zone: UTC+01:00 (CET)
  - Summer (DST): UTC+02:00 (CEST)
- Website: www.vg-poettmes.de

Pöttmes is a Verwaltungsgemeinschaft (municipal association) in the district of Aichach-Friedberg in Bavaria, Germany. Its seat is in Pöttmes.

It consists of the following municipalities:

1. Baar
2. Pöttmes
