= Kühbach (Verwaltungsgemeinschaft) =

- Verwaltungsgemeinschaft
- Location of Kühbach within Aichach-Friedberg district
- Interactive map of Kühbach
- Location within Germany Location within Bavaria
- Coordinates: 48°30′N 11°11′E
- Country: Germany
- State: Bavaria
- Admin. region: Swabia
- District: Aichach-Friedberg
- Seat: Kühbach
- Subdivisions: 2 municipalities

Area
  - Total: 67.28 km^{2} (25.98 sq mi)

Population (2025-12-31)
  - Total: 6,056
  - Density: 90.01/km^{2} (233.1/sq mi)
- Time zone: UTC+01:00 (CET)
  - Summer (DST): UTC+02:00 (CEST)
- Website: www.vg-kuehbach.de

Kühbach is a Verwaltungsgemeinschaft (municipal association) in the district of Aichach-Friedberg in Bavaria, Germany. Its seat is in Kühbach.

It consists of the following municipalities:

1. Kühbach
2. Schiltberg
