= Dasing (Verwaltungsgemeinschaft) =

- Verwaltungsgemeinschaft
- Location of Dasing within Aichach-Friedberg district
- Interactive map of Dasing
- Location within Germany Location within Bavaria
- Coordinates: 48°23′N 11°03′E
- Country: Germany
- State: Bavaria
- Admin. region: Swabia
- District: Aichach-Friedberg
- Seat: Dasing
- Subdivisions: 5 municipalities

Area
  - Total: 109.87 km^{2} (42.42 sq mi)

Population (2025-12-31)
  - Total: 13,449
  - Density: 122.41/km^{2} (317.04/sq mi)
- Time zone: UTC+01:00 (CET)
  - Summer (DST): UTC+02:00 (CEST)
- Website: www.vg-dasing.de

Dasing is a Verwaltungsgemeinschaft (municipal association) in the district of Aichach-Friedberg in Bavaria, Germany. Its seat is in Dasing.

It consists of the following municipalities:

1. Adelzhausen
2. Dasing
3. Eurasburg
4. Obergriesbach
5. Sielenbach
