= Aindling =

- Municipality
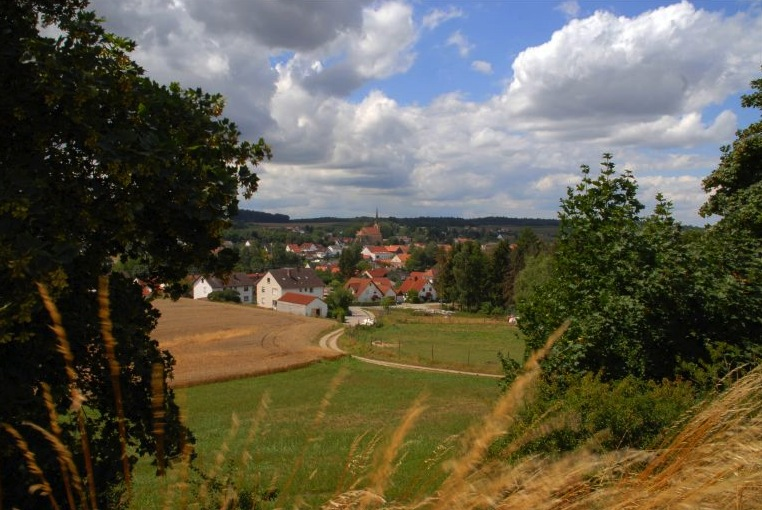
- View towards Aindling

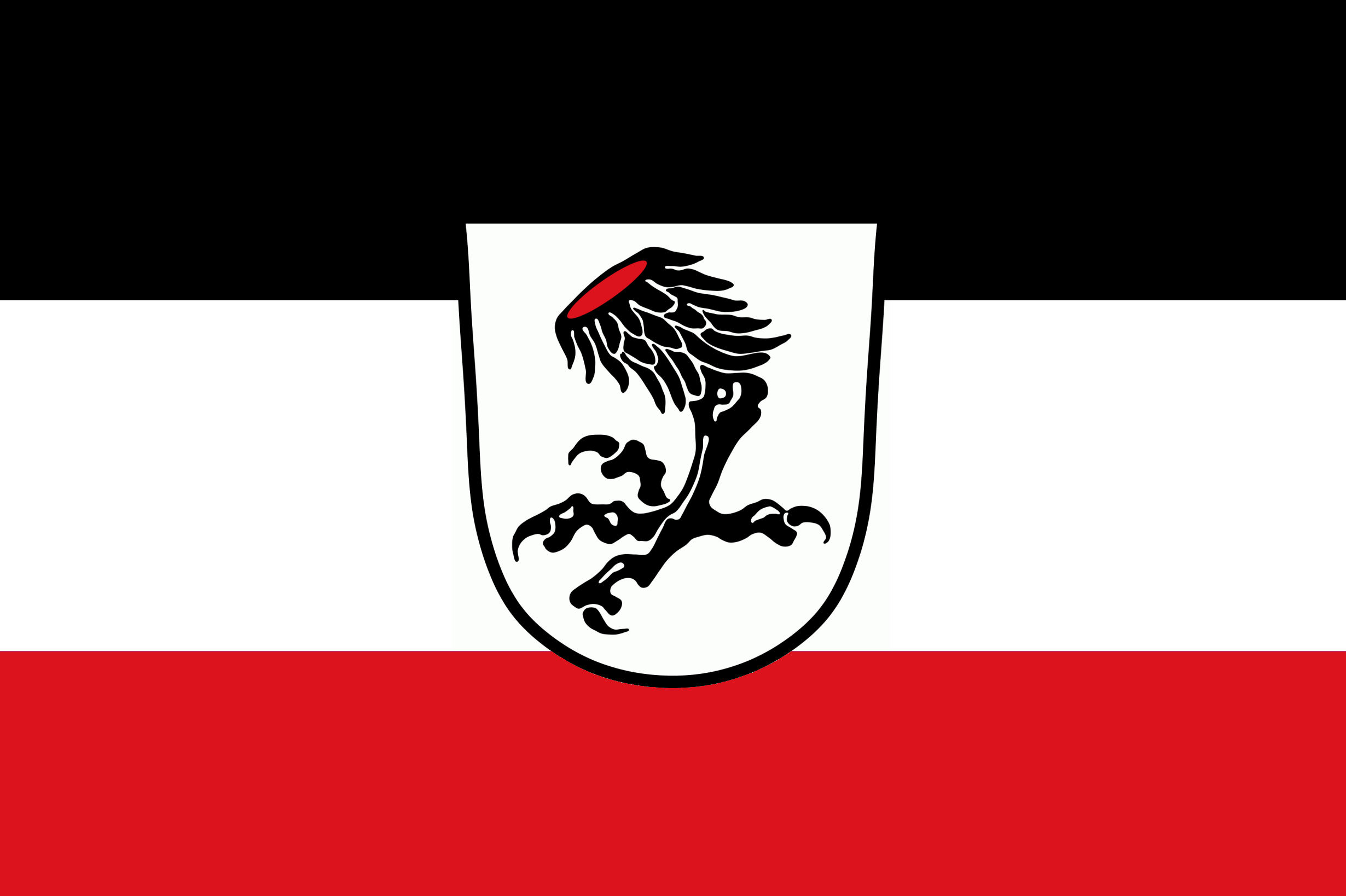
- Flag Coat of arms

- Location of Aindling within Aichach-Friedberg district
- Interactive map of Aindling
- Location within Germany Location within Bavaria
- Coordinates: 48°31′N 10°57′E
- Country: Germany
- State: Bavaria
- Admin. region: Schwaben
- District: Aichach-Friedberg
- Municipal assoc.: Aindling

Government
  - Mayor (2020–26): Gertrud Hitzler

Area
  - Total: 31.43 km^{2} (12.14 sq mi)
- Elevation: 466 m (1,529 ft)

Population (2025-12-31)
  - Total: 4,694
  - Density: 149.3/km^{2} (386.8/sq mi)
- Time zone: UTC+01:00 (CET)
  - Summer (DST): UTC+02:00 (CEST)
- Postal codes: 86447
- Dialling codes: 08237
- Vehicle registration: AIC
- Website: www.aindling.de

Aindling is a market town in Aichach-Friedberg district, in Bavaria, southern Germany.

== Partner cities ==
- Avord, France, since 1977
- Fürstenfeld, Austria
