= Obergriesbach =

- Municipality
- Coat of arms

- Location of Obergriesbach within Aichach-Friedberg district
- Interactive map of Obergriesbach
- Location within Germany Location within Bavaria
- Coordinates: 48°25′N 11°4′E
- Country: Germany
- State: Bavaria
- Admin. region: Schwaben
- District: Aichach-Friedberg
- Municipal assoc.: Dasing

Government
  - Mayor (2020–26): Jürgen Hörmann

Area
  - Total: 10.32 km^{2} (3.98 sq mi)
- Elevation: 479 m (1,572 ft)

Population (2025-12-31)
  - Total: 2,022
  - Density: 195.9/km^{2} (507.5/sq mi)
- Time zone: UTC+01:00 (CET)
  - Summer (DST): UTC+02:00 (CEST)
- Postal codes: 86573
- Dialling codes: 08251, 08205
- Vehicle registration: AIC
- Website: www.obergriesbach.de

Obergriesbach (German pronunciation: [ˌoːbɐˈɡʁiːsbax]) is a municipality in southern Bavaria in Germany. It is part of the Aichach-Friedberg district and is located some 22 km from Augsburg.
