= Inchenhofen =

- Municipality
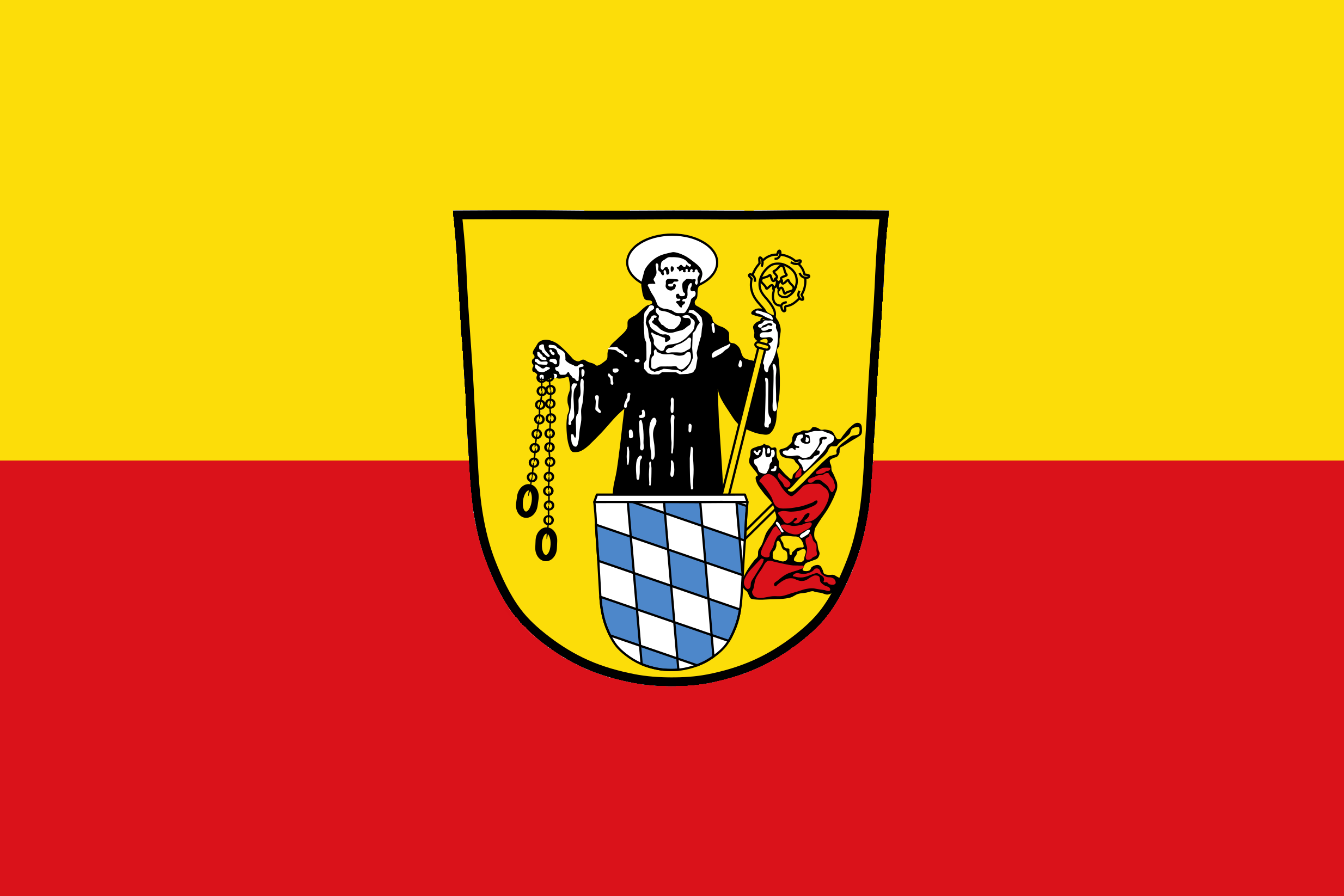
- Flag Coat of arms

- Location of Inchenhofen within Aichach-Friedberg district
- Interactive map of Inchenhofen
- Location within Germany Location within Bavaria
- Coordinates: 48°31′N 11°7′E
- Country: Germany
- State: Bavaria
- Admin. region: Schwaben
- District: Aichach-Friedberg

Government
  - Mayor (2020–26): Anton Schoder

Area
  - Total: 27.55 km^{2} (10.64 sq mi)
- Elevation: 460–485 m (1,509–1,591 ft)

Population (2025-12-31)
  - Total: 2,760
  - Density: 100/km^{2} (259/sq mi)
- Time zone: UTC+01:00 (CET)
  - Summer (DST): UTC+02:00 (CEST)
- Postal codes: 86570
- Dialling codes: 08257
- Vehicle registration: AIC
- Website: www.inchenhofen.de

Inchenhofen (also known as Leahad in the local tongue) is a municipality in the district of Aichach-Friedberg in Bavaria in Germany.

Leahad refers to the fact, that it is a pilgrimage site for Saint Leonard of Noblac. Until the Secularisation, it was the most important pilgrimage site of this saint in central Europe.
