= Pöttmes =

- Municipality
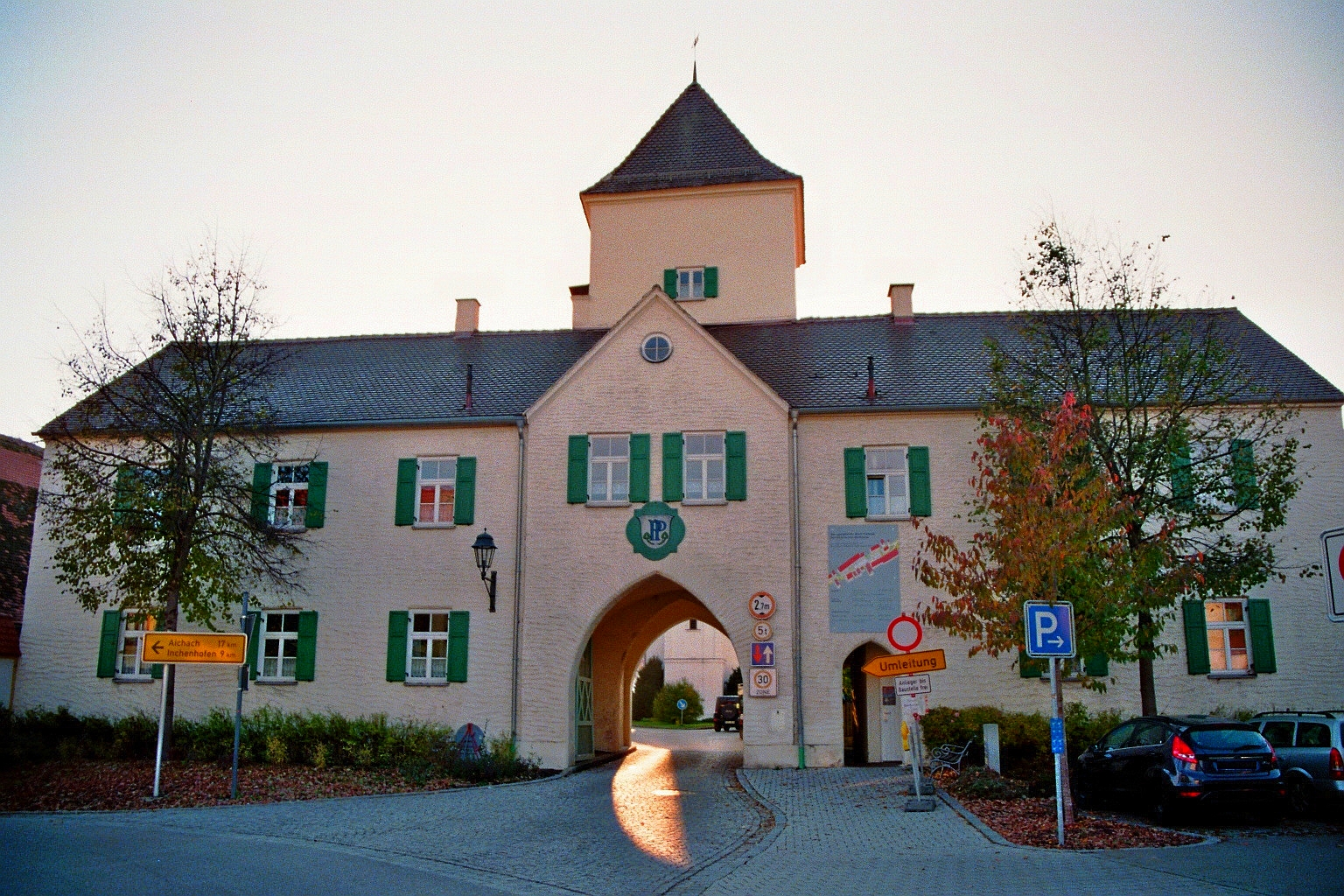
- Pöttmes Market Gate

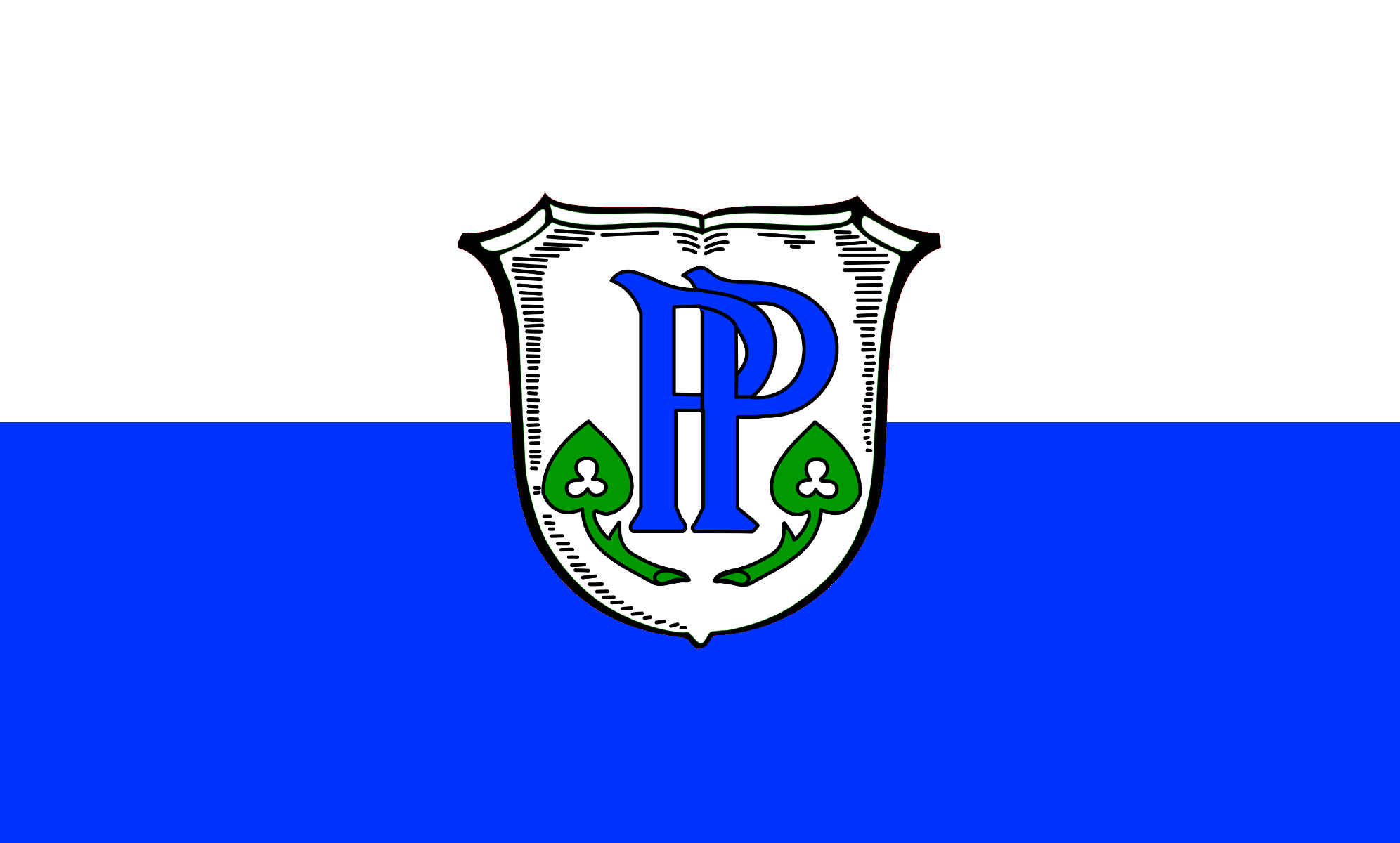
- Flag Coat of arms

- Location of Pöttmes within Aichach-Friedberg district
- Interactive map of Pöttmes
- Location within Germany Location within Bavaria
- Coordinates: 48°35′N 11°6′E
- Country: Germany
- State: Bavaria
- Admin. region: Schwaben
- District: Aichach-Friedberg
- Municipal assoc.: Pöttmes

Government
  - Mayor (2020–26): Mirko Ketz (CSU)

Area
  - Total: 82.58 km^{2} (31.88 sq mi)
- Elevation: 407 m (1,335 ft)

Population (2025-12-31)
  - Total: 7,052
  - Density: 85.40/km^{2} (221.2/sq mi)
- Time zone: UTC+01:00 (CET)
  - Summer (DST): UTC+02:00 (CEST)
- Postal codes: 86554
- Dialling codes: 08253
- Vehicle registration: AIC
- Website: www.markt-poettmes.de

Pöttmes is a market town and municipality in the district of Aichach-Friedberg in Bavaria in Germany.

== Personalities ==
=== Sons and Daughters of the Community ===
- Aurelie Deffner (1881-1959), politician
- Joachim Rückert (born 1945), legal scientist

=== Honorary citizen ===
- Karl Hofmann (1924-2012), awarded in 1991, 1st Mayor 1972-1990
