= Kühbach =

- Municipality
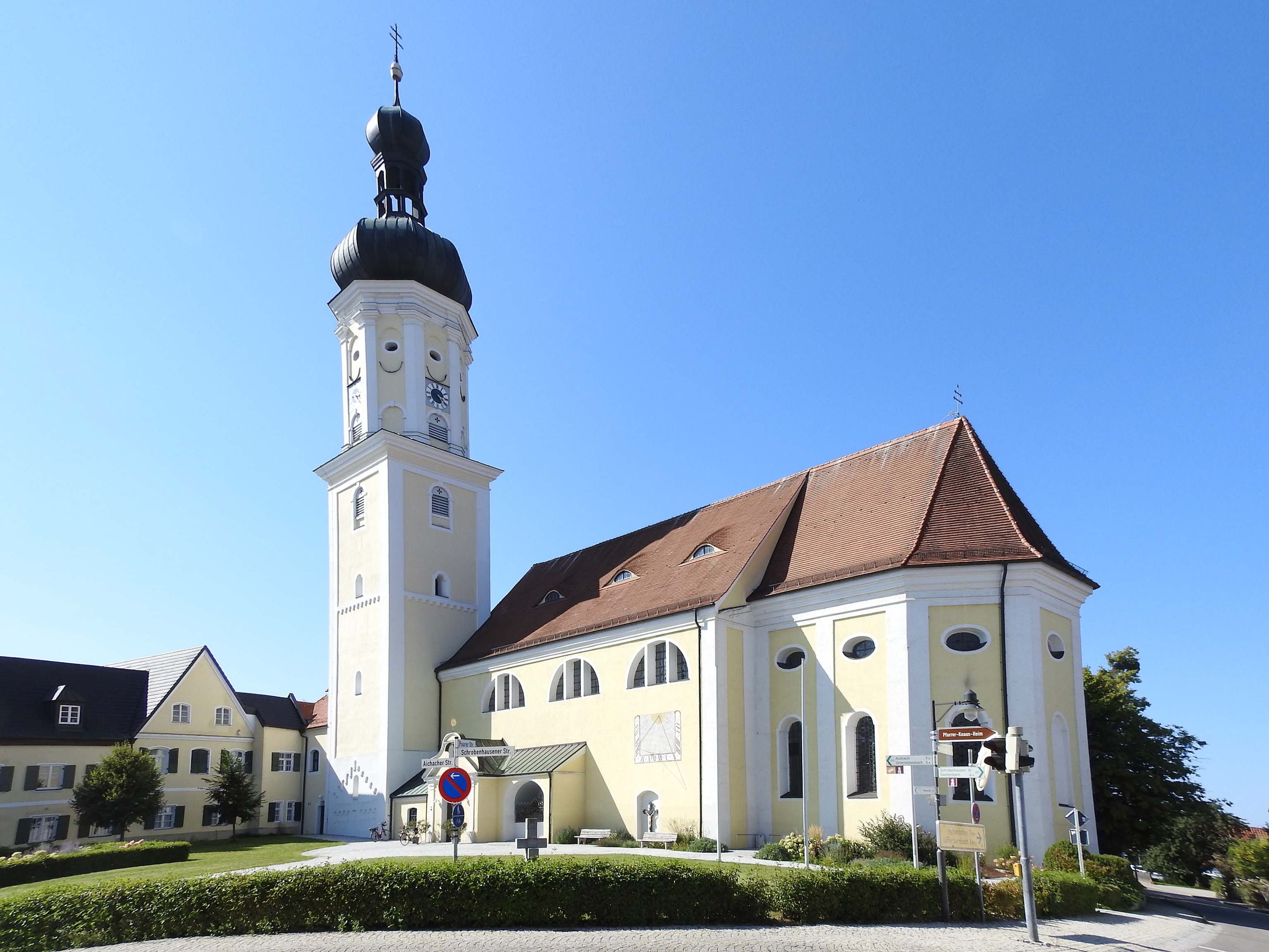
- Church of Saint Magnus

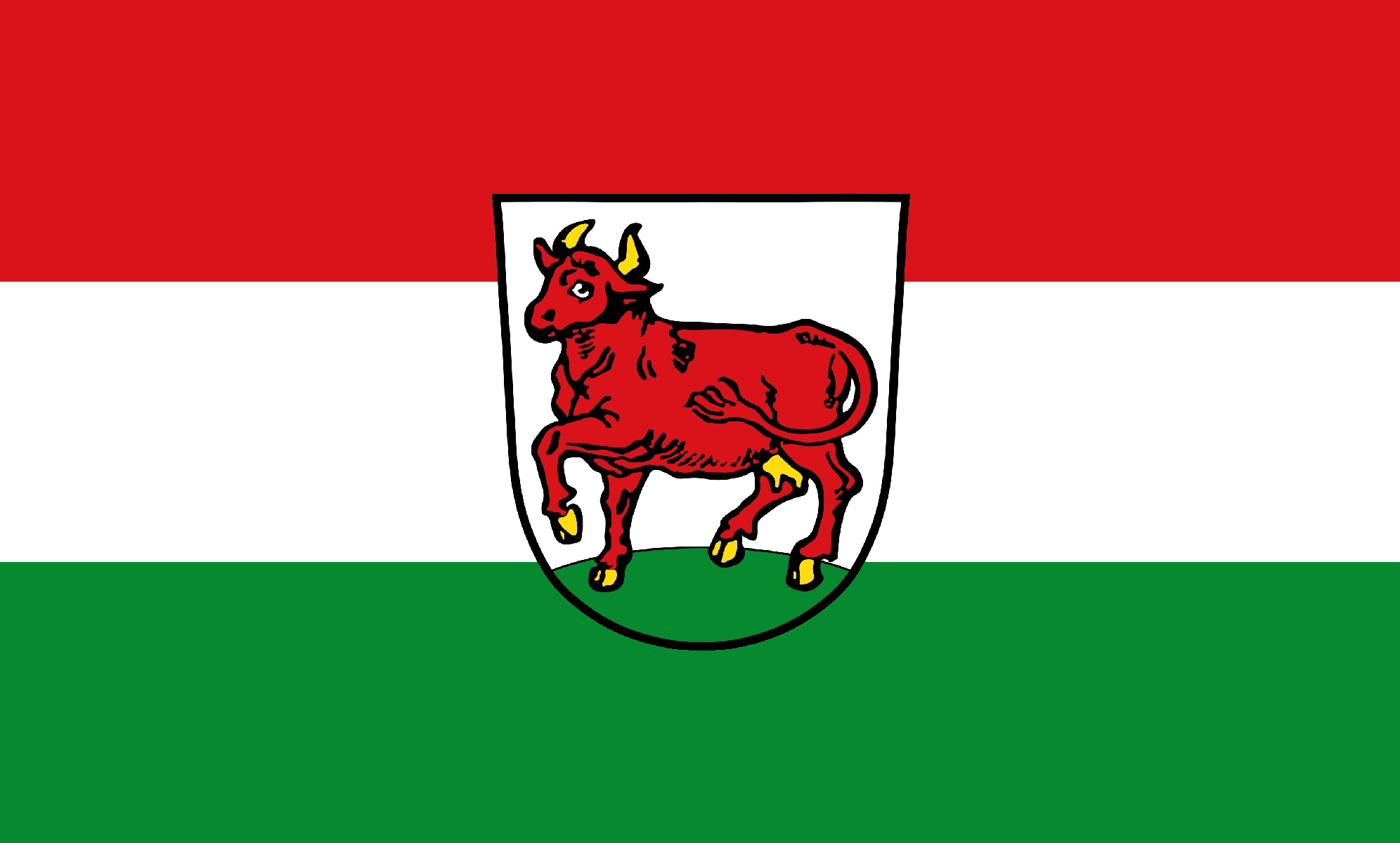
- Flag Coat of arms

- Location of Kühbach within Aichach-Friedberg district
- Interactive map of Kühbach
- Location within Germany Location within Bavaria
- Coordinates: 48°30′N 11°11′E
- Country: Germany
- State: Bavaria
- Admin. region: Schwaben
- District: Aichach-Friedberg
- Municipal assoc.: Kühbach

Government
  - Mayor (2020–26): Karl-Heinz Kerscher

Area
  - Total: 37.57 km^{2} (14.51 sq mi)
- Elevation: 424–455 m (1,391–1,493 ft)

Population (2025-12-31)
  - Total: 4,100
  - Density: 110/km^{2} (280/sq mi)
- Time zone: UTC+01:00 (CET)
  - Summer (DST): UTC+02:00 (CEST)
- Postal codes: 86556
- Dialling codes: 08251
- Vehicle registration: AIC
- Website: https://www.markt-kuehbach.de/

Kühbach is a market town and municipality in the district of Aichach-Friedberg in Bavaria in Germany.
