= Eurasburg, Swabia =

Eurasburg
- Municipality
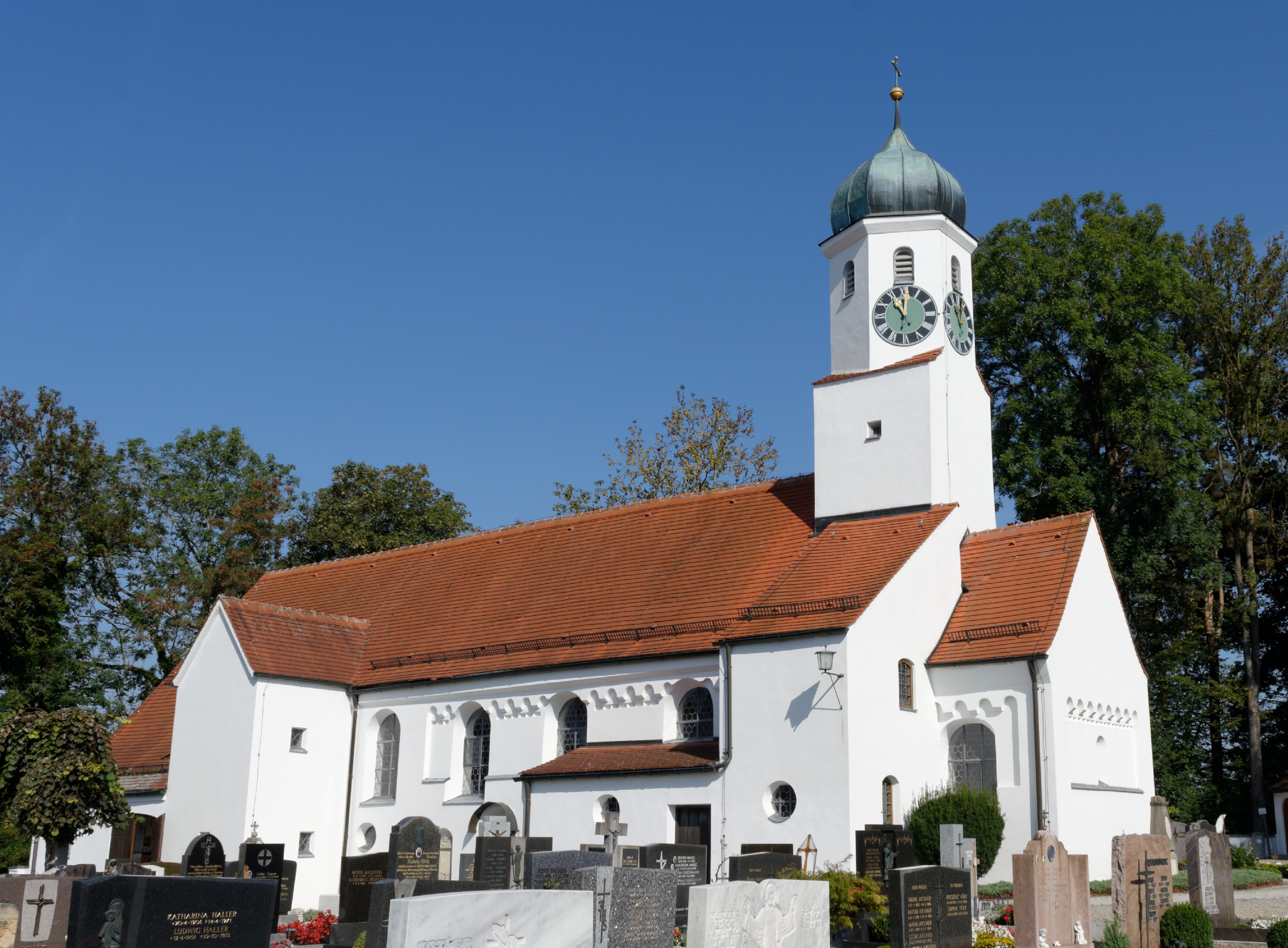
- Church of the Holy Cross

- Coat of arms

- Location of Eurasburg within Aichach-Friedberg district
- Interactive map of Eurasburg
- Location within Germany Location within Bavaria
- Coordinates: 48°20′N 11°5′E
- Country: Germany
- State: Bavaria
- Admin. region: Schwaben
- District: Aichach-Friedberg
- Municipal assoc.: Dasing

Government
  - Mayor (2020–26): Paul Reithmeir

Area
  - Total: 23.96 km^{2} (9.25 sq mi)
- Elevation: 485–535 m (1,591–1,755 ft)

Population (2025-12-31)
  - Total: 1,840
  - Density: 76.8/km^{2} (199/sq mi)
- Time zone: UTC+01:00 (CET)
  - Summer (DST): UTC+02:00 (CEST)
- Postal codes: 86495
- Dialling codes: 08208
- Vehicle registration: AIC, FDB
- Website: www.gemeinde-eurasburg.de

Eurasburg is a municipality in the district of Aichach-Friedberg in Bavaria in Germany.
