= Mering =

- Municipality
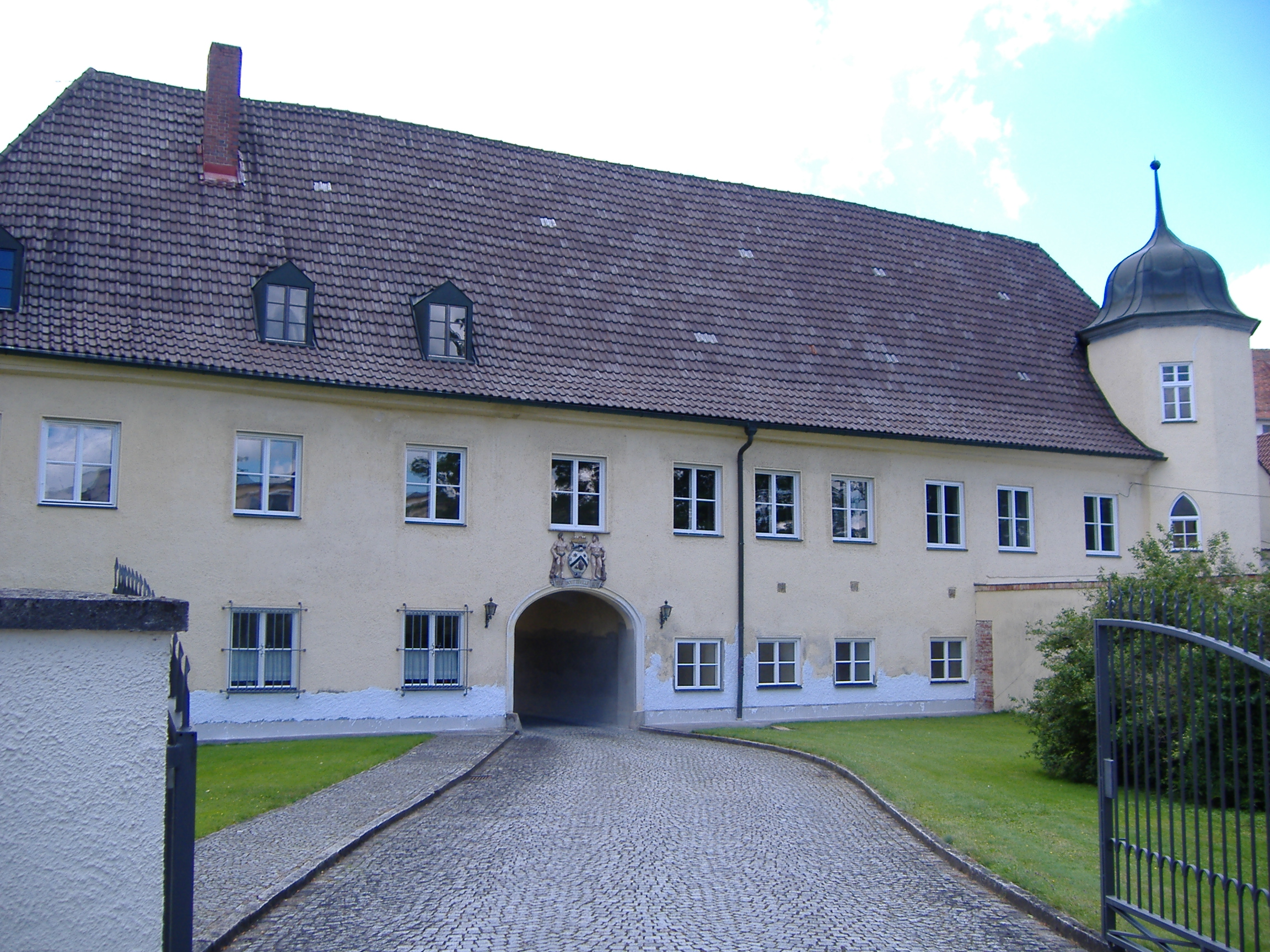
- Mering Palace

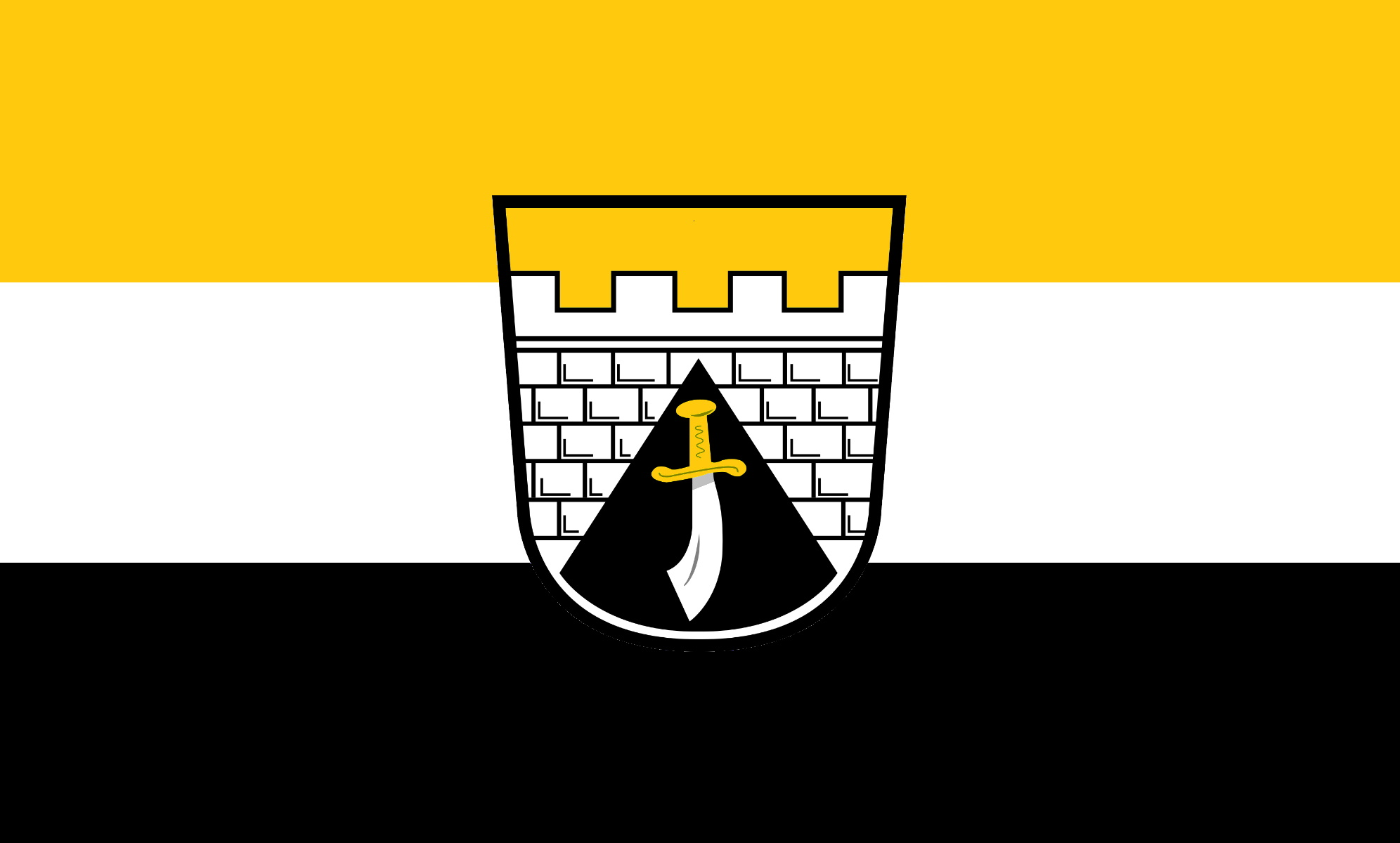
- Flag Coat of arms

- Location of Mering within Aichach-Friedberg district
- Interactive map of Mering
- Location within Germany Location within Bavaria
- Coordinates: 48°15′45″N 10°59′04″E
- Country: Germany
- State: Bavaria
- Admin. region: Schwaben
- District: Aichach-Friedberg
- Municipal assoc.: Mering

Government
  - Mayor (2020–26): Florian Mayer (CSU)

Area
  - Total: 26.83 km^{2} (10.36 sq mi)
- Elevation: 505–560 m (1,657–1,837 ft)

Population (2025-12-31)
  - Total: 15,329
  - Density: 571.3/km^{2} (1,480/sq mi)
- Time zone: UTC+01:00 (CET)
  - Summer (DST): UTC+02:00 (CEST)
- Postal codes: 86415
- Dialling codes: 08233
- Vehicle registration: AIC, FDB
- Website: www.mering.de

Mering (German pronunciation: [ˈmeːʁɪŋ]) is a municipality in the district Aichach-Friedberg, in Bavaria, Germany. It is located on the river Paar.

First mentioned in records in 1021, Mering has a long history.

With nearly 15,000 inhabitants in 2021, the town continues to grow in part because of its convenient location between Munich and Augsburg — the main railway station in Mering is 30 minutes away from Munich and 15 minutes away from Augsburg by train. Mering is also home to many stores within easy walking distance. Its motto is "Ihr Einkaufsort der kurzen Wege" (Your shopping centre of short distances).

Mering is also known for its Baroque Catholic church St. Michael, built in 1789. A popular place is the recently redesigned main square (Marktplatz) with shops and restaurants in ancient buildings surrounding the fountain. Every Friday the local farmers' market takes place here.

== History ==
Mering was first mentioned in 1021. It was a family possession of the Swabian Guelph. In 1167 the Hohenstaufen Emperor Frederick I Barbarossa took by inheritance contract the Guelph house estates in Swabia, which were added to the Hohenstaufen house goods. With the beheading of the Holy Roman Emperor Conradin in 1268 the Bavarian dukes came into the possession of Mering. This was part of their efforts to extend their sphere of influence into the Alemannic settlement area, up to the Lech.

Mering belonged to the Rentamt Munich within the Electorate of Bavaria. In 1838, the municipality Mering was awarded a coat of arms by King Ludwig I, which points to the former Guelph Castle and the Battle of Lechfeld in 955. On November 18, 1911 Mering was elevated to a market town.

After being part of Bavarian territory for 700 years, Mering became part of the Swabian district Friedberg in 1944 (since the district reform in 1972, a part of the newly formed district Aichach-Friedberg), within Bavaria. In the area of Mering the Lechrain dialect is spoken, a Swabian dialect with strong Bavarian influence.
