= Dasing =

- Municipality
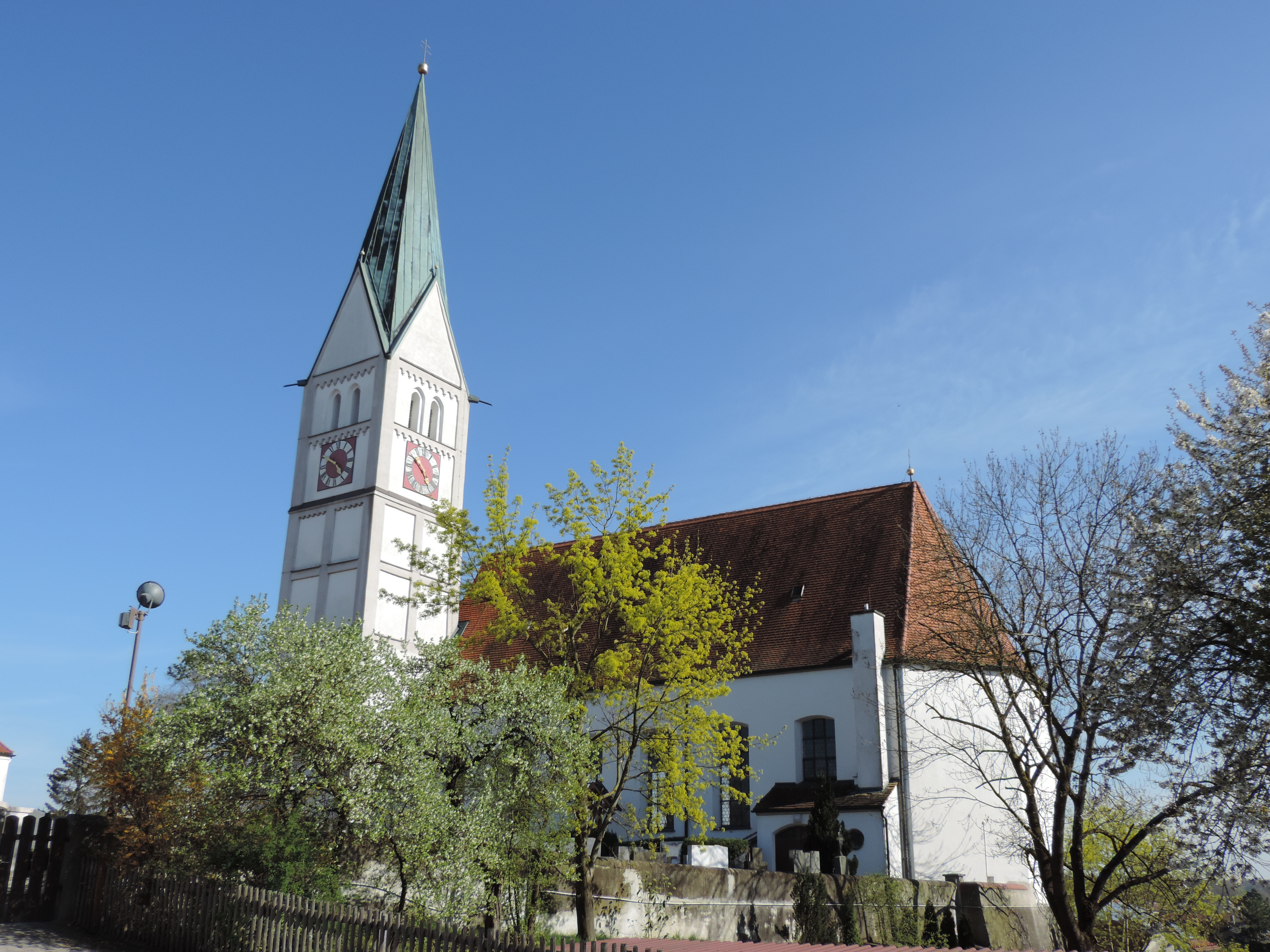
- Church of Saint Martin

- Coat of arms

- Location of Dasing within Aichach-Friedberg district
- Interactive map of Dasing
- Location within Germany Location within Bavaria
- Coordinates: 48°22′N 11°3′E
- Country: Germany
- State: Bavaria
- Admin. region: Schwaben
- District: Aichach-Friedberg
- Municipal assoc.: Dasing

Government
  - Mayor (2020–26): Andreas Wiesner (FW)

Area
  - Total: 40.91 km^{2} (15.80 sq mi)
- Elevation: 483 m (1,585 ft)

Population (2025-12-31)
  - Total: 5,840
  - Density: 143/km^{2} (370/sq mi)
- Time zone: UTC+01:00 (CET)
  - Summer (DST): UTC+02:00 (CEST)
- Postal codes: 86453
- Dialling codes: 08205
- Vehicle registration: AIC
- Website: www.dasing.de

Dasing is a municipality in the district of Aichach-Friedberg in Bavaria in Germany.
