= Aichach-Friedberg =

Coordinates: 48°25′N 11°05′E

- District
- Flag Coat of arms
- Country: Germany
- State: Bavaria
- Adm. region: Swabia
- Capital: Aichach

Government
  - District admin.: Klaus Metzger (CSU)

Area
  - Total: 781 km^{2} (302 sq mi)

Population (31 December 2025)
  - Total: 137,281
  - Density: 176/km^{2} (455/sq mi)
- Time zone: UTC+01:00 (CET)
  - Summer (DST): UTC+02:00 (CEST)
- Vehicle registration: AIC, FDB
- Website: lra-aic-fdb.de

Aichach-Friedberg is a Landkreis (district) in Bavaria, Germany. It is bounded by (from the northwest and clockwise) the districts of Augsburg, Donau-Ries, Neuburg-Schrobenhausen, Pfaffenhofen, Dachau, Fürstenfeldbruck and Landsberg, as well as by the city of Augsburg.

== History ==
Aichach-Friedberg was settled by Bavarian tribes from the seventh century on. The region is sometimes called the cradle of Bavaria, since the castle of Wittelsbach was located close to the present city of Aichach. It was the ancestral castle of the Wittelsbach family, who were rulers of Bavaria for thousand years. The castle was razed to the ground in 1208, and today there is nothing else left than a memorial stone at the place.

The town of Friedberg was founded in the 13th century in order to collect a toll from people using the bridge across the Lech River. Aichach became a town about hundred years later. In 1862 the two districts of Aichach and Friedberg were founded. They were merged in 1972 and became part of the administrative region of Swabia. Anyhow, historically Aichach-Friedberg does not belong to Swabia, but to Old Bavaria. The name of the new district was originally Augsburg-Ost ("Augsburg East"), but it was changed to Aichach-Friedberg in 1973.

== Geography ==
The district is located to the east of the city of Augsburg and comprises a rural area with few major towns. The Lech River forms the western border of the district. Another river, the Paar (an affluent of the Danube), enters the district in the southwest, runs through Aichach and leaves to the northeast.

The territory is also known as Wittelsbacher Land, due to the castle of Wittelsbach near Aichach.

== Coat of arms ==
The coat of arms displays:

- top: the white and blue checkered pattern of Bavaria
- bottom left: the oak leaf from the old coat of arms of Aichach
- bottom right: the Ulrich's Cross, used by the bishops of Augsburg

== Towns and municipalities ==
Clickable map of towns and municipalities in the district

Towns
1. Aichach
2. Friedberg
Märkte
1. Inchenhofen
Municipalities
1. Affing
2. Hollenbach
3. Kissing
4. Merching
5. Rehling
6. Ried

Verwaltungsgemeinschaften
1. Aindling; 1. Aindling^{1,2}; 2. Petersdorf; 3. Todtenweis	2. Dasing; 1. Adelzhausen; 2. Dasing^{1}; 3. Eurasburg; 4. Obergriesbach; 5. Sielenbach	3. Kühbach; 1. Kühbach^{1,2}; 2. Schiltberg	4. Mering; 1. Mering^{1,2}; 2. Schmiechen; 3. Steindorf	5. Pöttmes; 1. Baar; 2. Pöttmes^{1,2}
^{1}seat of the Verwaltungsgemeinschaft; ^{2}Markt

== Town twinning ==
- Affing: Lobez (Poland)
- Aichach: Brixlegg (Austria), Gödöllö (Hungary), Schifferstadt (Germany)
- Aindling: Avord (France)
- Dasing: Siedlce (Poland)
- Friedberg: Bressuire (France), Chippenham (England), Friedberg (Austria), La Crosse (USA), Völs am Schlern (Italy)
- Hollenbach: Contest (France)
- Kühbach: intended with Balatonföldvár (Hungary)
- Mering: Ambérieu-en-Bugey (France)
- Obergriesbach: Eltendorf (Austria)
- Pöttmes: La Haye-Pesnel (France)
- Schiltberg: Schwertberg (Austria)
- Sielenbach: Saint-Fraimbault-de-Prières (France)
