= Adelsried =

- Municipality
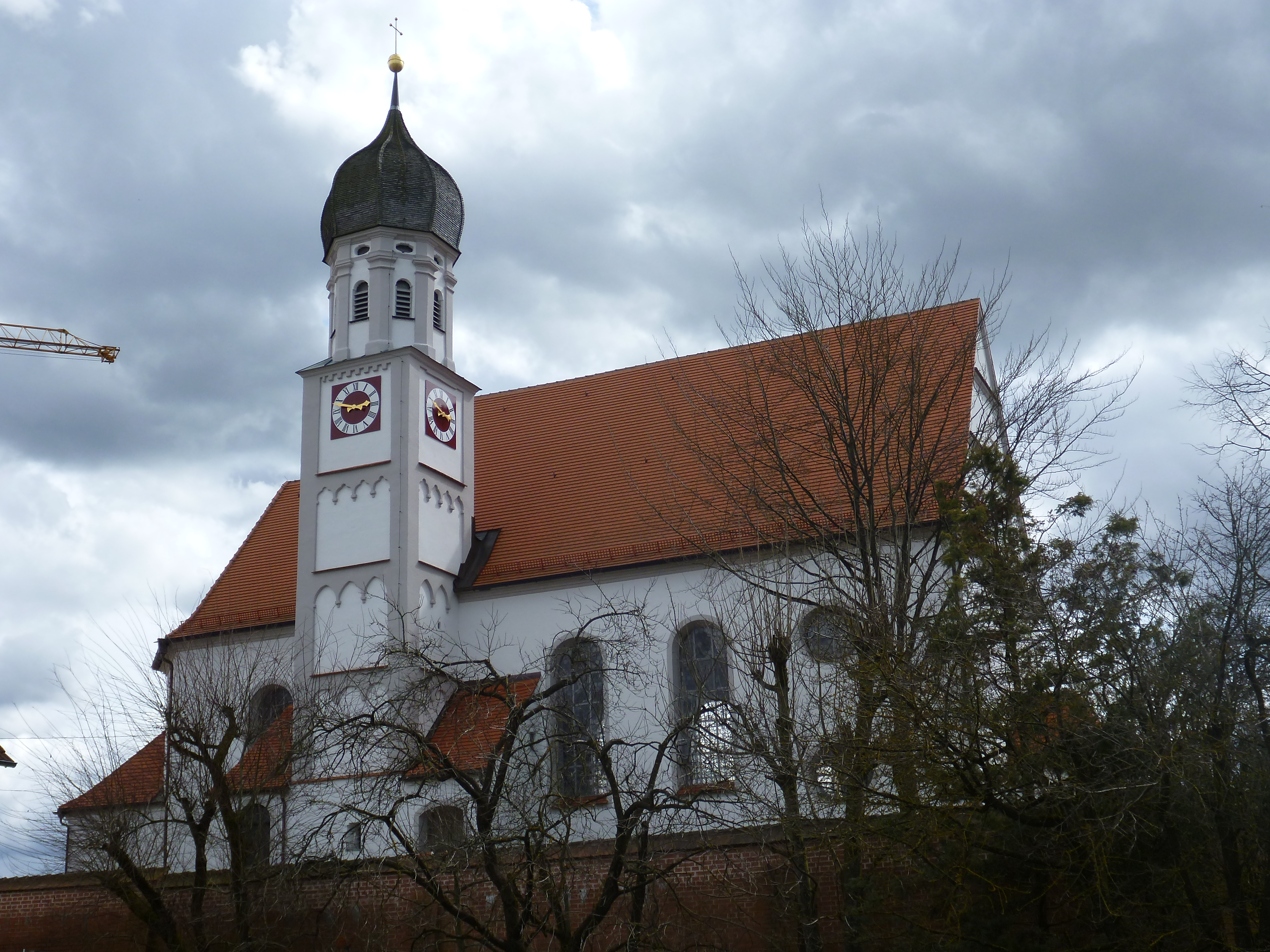
- Church of Saint John the Baptist

- Coat of arms

- Location of Adelsried within Augsburg district
- Interactive map of Adelsried
- Location within Germany Location within Bavaria
- Coordinates: 48°25′N 10°43′E
- Country: Germany
- State: Bavaria
- Admin. region: Schwaben
- District: Augsburg

Government
  - Mayor (2020–26): Sebastian Bernhard (CSU)

Area
  - Total: 9.7 km^{2} (3.7 sq mi)
- Elevation: 485 m (1,591 ft)

Population (2025-12-31)
  - Total: 2,569
  - Density: 260/km^{2} (690/sq mi)
- Time zone: UTC+01:00 (CET)
  - Summer (DST): UTC+02:00 (CEST)
- Postal codes: 86477
- Dialling codes: 08294
- Vehicle registration: A
- Website: www.adelsried.de

Adelsried is a municipality in the district of Augsburg in Bavaria in Germany.

== Location ==
Adelsried is located on the edge of the swabic Holzwinkel in Naturpark Augsburg – Western Forests in Landkreis Augsburg and around 20 km from Augsburg.

The Holzwinkel locked in 5 suburbs of Adelsried, Bonstetten, Heretsried, Welden and Emersacker. It is a densely forested area.

=== Parts ===
- Adelsried, Mainarea,
  - Kruichen, Village
  - Engelshof, wasteland
