= Bonstetten, Bavaria =

Bonstetten
- Municipality
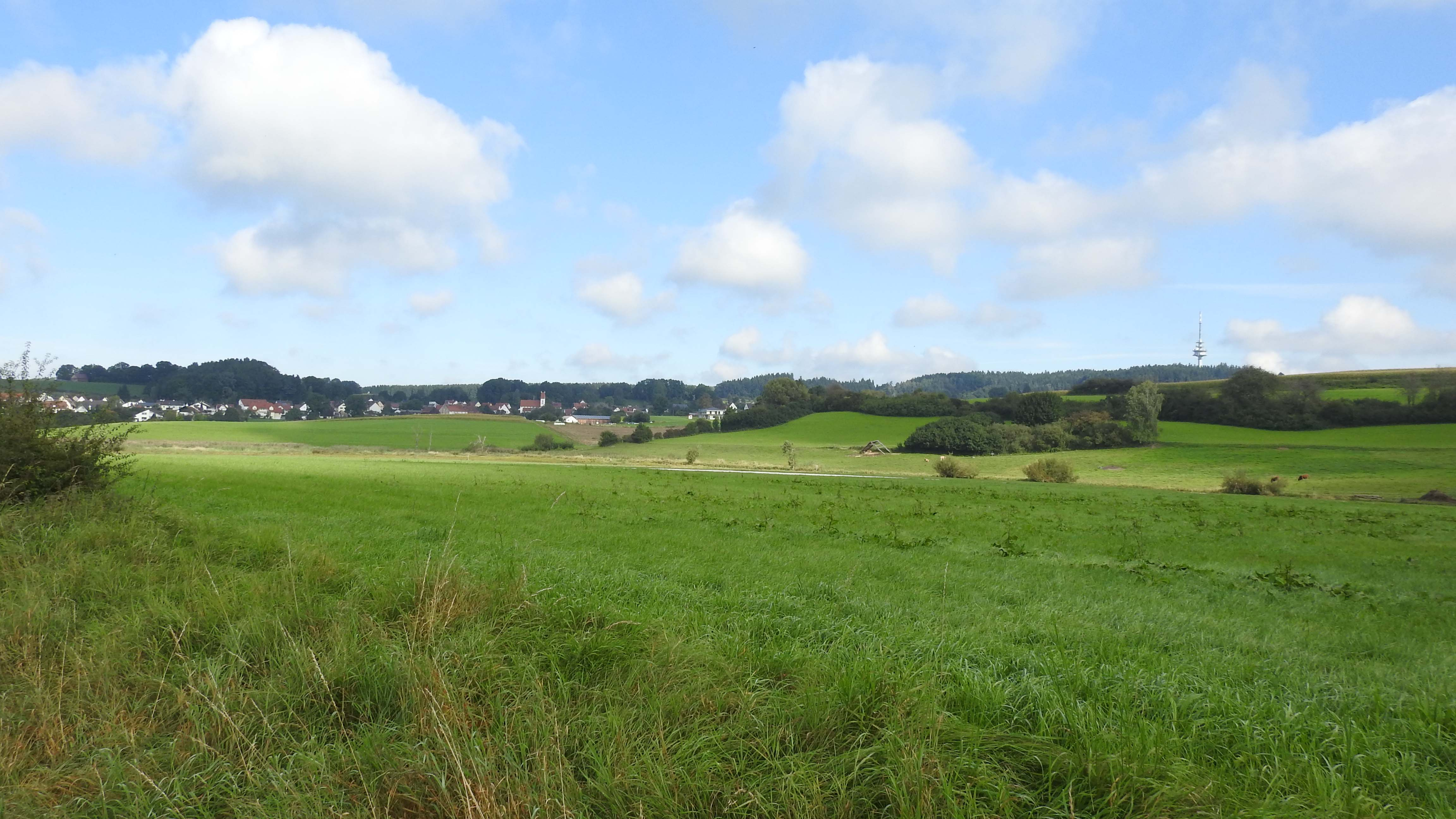
- Bonstetten seen from the south

- Coat of arms

- Location of Bonstetten within Augsburg district
- Interactive map of Bonstetten
- Location within Germany Location within Bavaria
- Coordinates: 48°26′N 10°42′E
- Country: Germany
- State: Bavaria
- Admin. region: Schwaben
- District: Augsburg
- Municipal assoc.: Welden

Government
  - Mayor (2020–26): Anton Gleich (CSU)

Area
  - Total: 6.71 km^{2} (2.59 sq mi)
- Elevation: 495 m (1,624 ft)

Population (2025-12-31)
  - Total: 1,582
  - Density: 236/km^{2} (611/sq mi)
- Time zone: UTC+01:00 (CET)
  - Summer (DST): UTC+02:00 (CEST)
- Postal codes: 86486
- Dialling codes: 08293
- Vehicle registration: A
- Website: www.bonstetten.de

Bonstetten (Swabian: Bõĩschteeda) is a municipality and small village in the district of Augsburg in Bavaria in Germany.

It lies on the south slope of the Stauffersberg.
