= Stauffersberg =

Mountain in Bavaria, Germany

Coordinates: 48°26′42″N 10°42′55″E

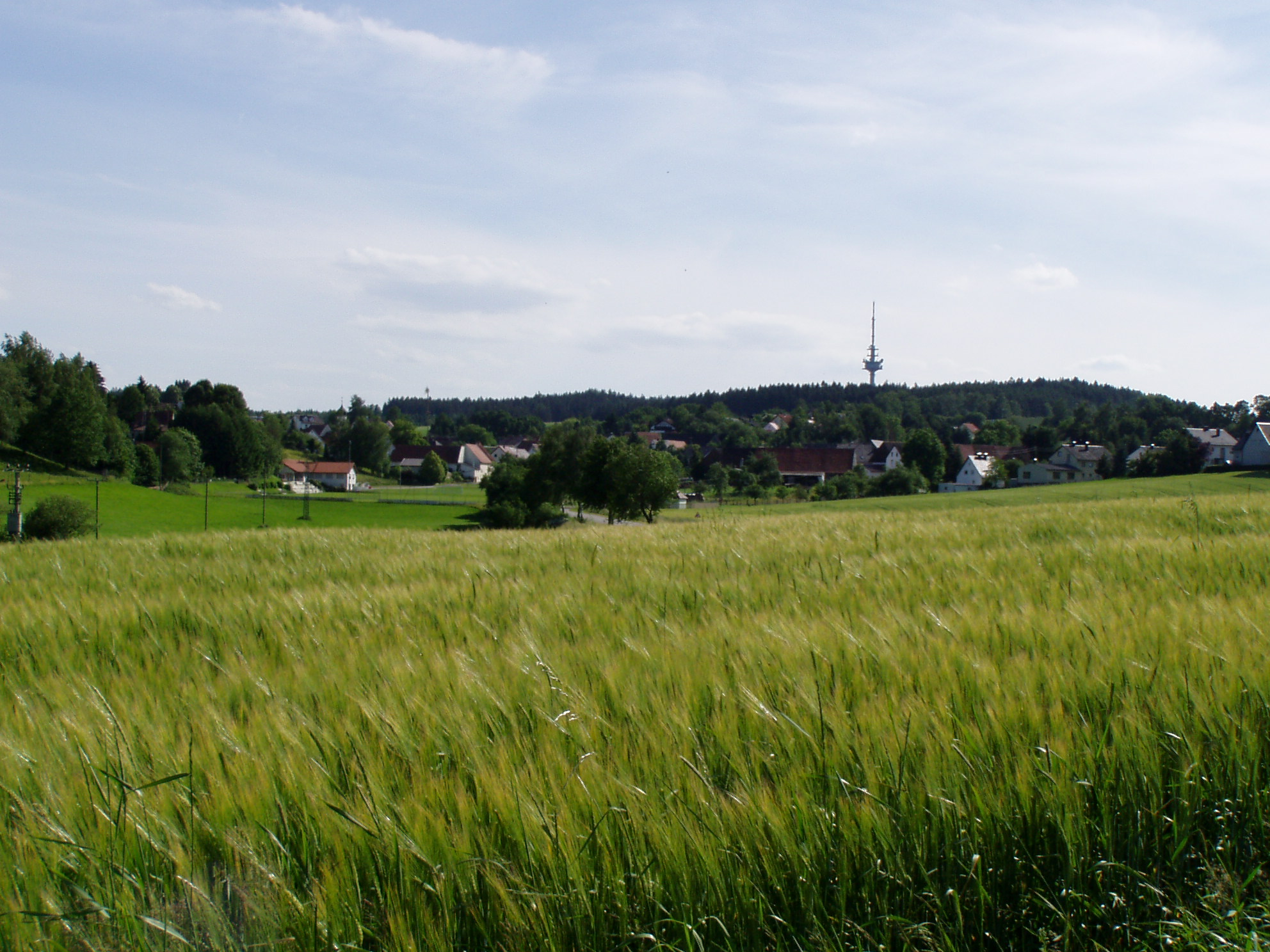

Highest point
- Elevation: 574.8 m (1,886 ft)

Geography
- Location: Bavaria, Germany

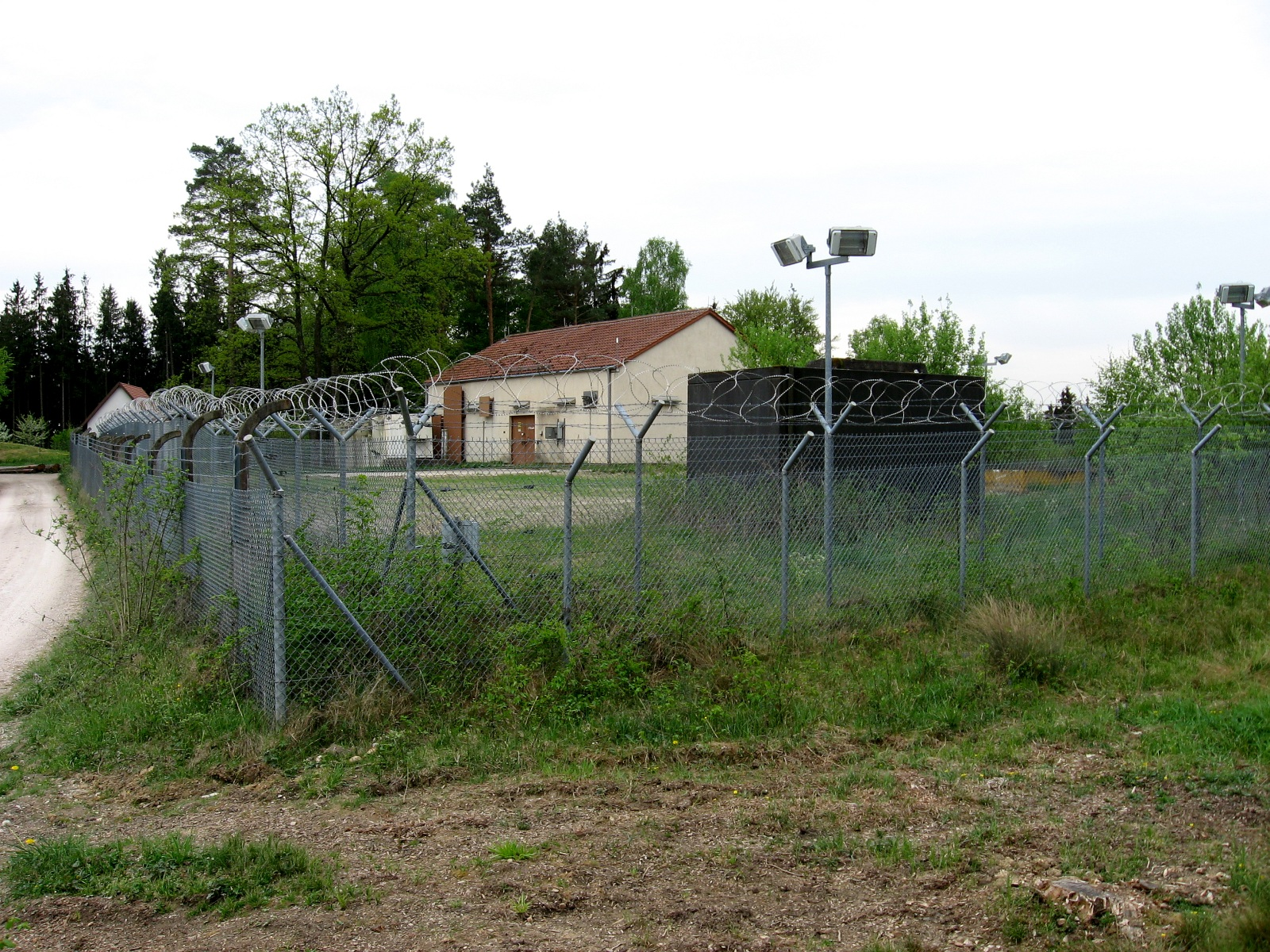
Former relay station of the US armed forces on the Stauffersberg.

Stauffersberg, also known as Staufenberg or Staufersberg, is a hill in Bavaria, Germany. Its elevation is 577 metres (1,893 ft). It is one of three gravel deposits between the Mindel and the Lech rivers.

The village of Bonstetten lies on its south slope.
