= Welden (Verwaltungsgemeinschaft) =

- Verwaltungsgemeinschaft
- Location of Welden within Augsburg district
- Interactive map of Welden
- Location within Germany Location within Bavaria
- Coordinates: 48°27′N 10°40′E
- Country: Germany
- State: Bavaria
- Admin. region: Swabia
- District: Augsburg
- Seat: Welden
- Subdivisions: 4 municipalities

Area
  - Total: 53.67 km^{2} (20.72 sq mi)

Population (2025-12-31)
  - Total: 8,049
  - Density: 150.0/km^{2} (388.4/sq mi)
- Time zone: UTC+01:00 (CET)
  - Summer (DST): UTC+02:00 (CEST)
- Website: www.vg-welden.de

Welden is a Verwaltungsgemeinschaft (municipal association) in the district of Augsburg in Bavaria, Germany. Its seat is in Welden.

It consists of the following municipalities:

1. Bonstetten
2. Emersacker
3. Heretsried
4. Welden
