= Emersacker =

- Municipality
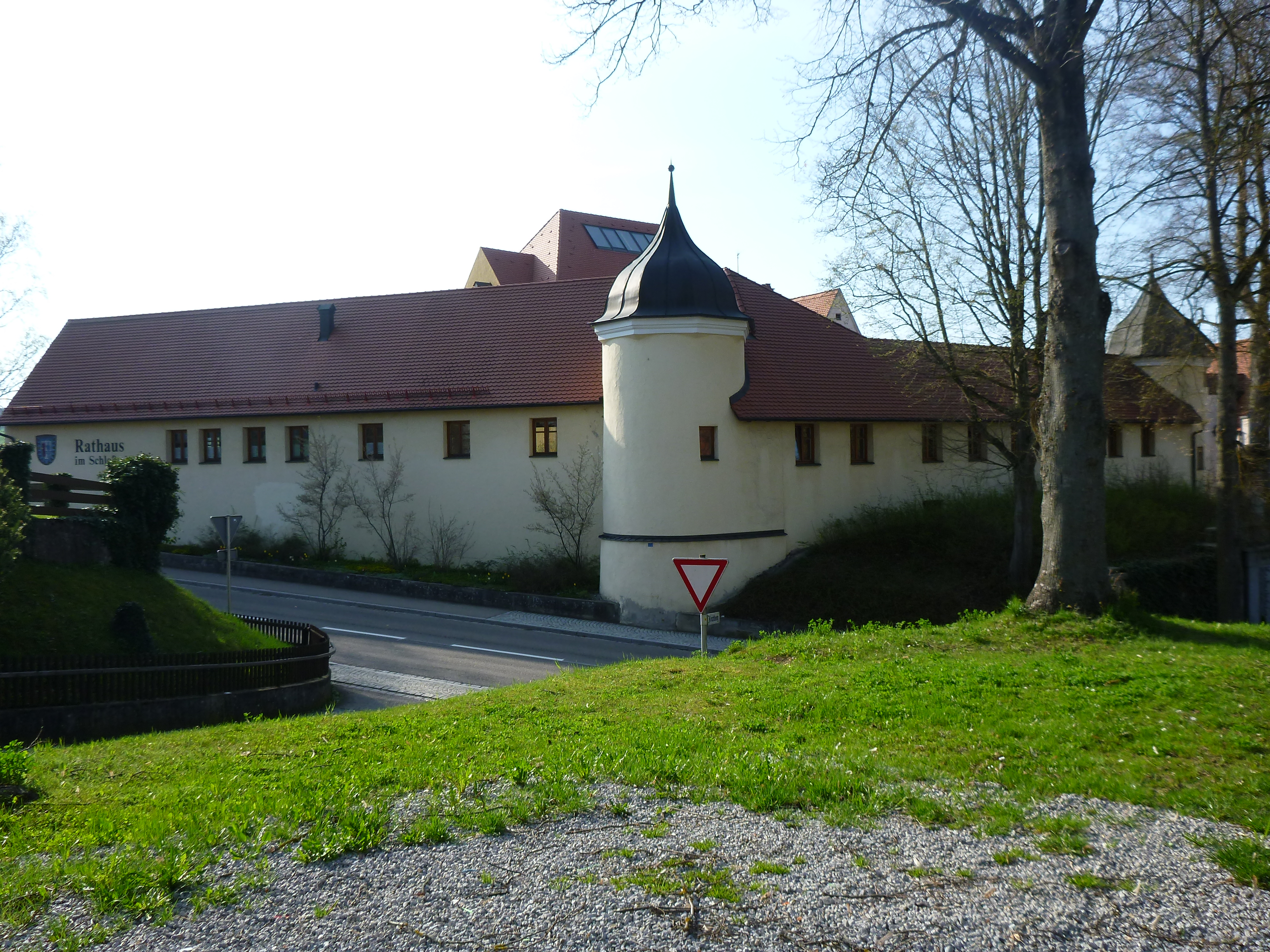
- Emersacker Castle

- Coat of arms

- Location of Emersacker within Augsburg district
- Interactive map of Emersacker
- Location within Germany Location within Bavaria
- Coordinates: 48°30′N 10°40′E
- Country: Germany
- State: Bavaria
- Admin. region: Schwaben
- District: Augsburg
- Municipal assoc.: Welden

Government
  - Mayor (2020–26): Karl-Heinz Mengele

Area
  - Total: 11.77 km^{2} (4.54 sq mi)
- Elevation: 457 m (1,499 ft)

Population (2025-12-31)
  - Total: 1,519
  - Density: 129.1/km^{2} (334.3/sq mi)
- Time zone: UTC+01:00 (CET)
  - Summer (DST): UTC+02:00 (CEST)
- Postal codes: 86494
- Dialling codes: 08293
- Vehicle registration: A
- Website: www.gemeinde-emersacker.de

Emersacker is a municipality in the district of Augsburg in Bavaria in Germany.
