= Welden =

- Municipality
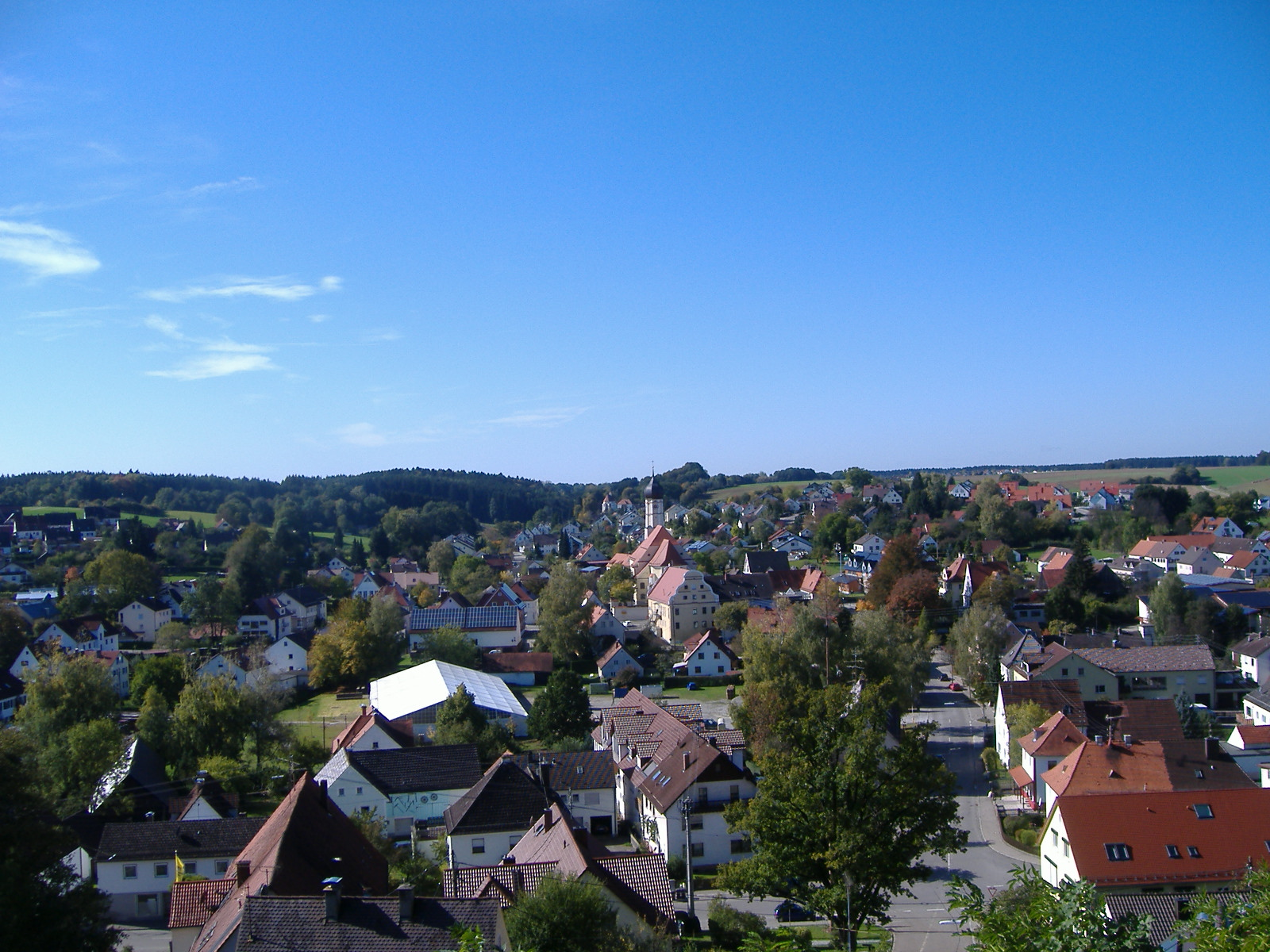
- Welden

- Coat of arms

- Location of Welden within Augsburg district
- Interactive map of Welden
- Location within Germany Location within Bavaria
- Coordinates: 48°27′N 10°40′E
- Country: Germany
- State: Bavaria
- Admin. region: Schwaben
- District: Augsburg
- Municipal assoc.: Welden

Government
  - Mayor (2020–26): Stefan Scheider

Area
  - Total: 17.98 km^{2} (6.94 sq mi)
- Elevation: 466 m (1,529 ft)

Population (2025-12-31)
  - Total: 3,900
  - Density: 220/km^{2} (560/sq mi)
- Time zone: UTC+01:00 (CET)
  - Summer (DST): UTC+02:00 (CEST)
- Postal codes: 86465
- Dialling codes: 08293
- Vehicle registration: A
- Website: http://www.markt-welden.de

Welden (German pronunciation: [ˈvɛldn̩]) is a community in the Augsburg district of Bavaria, in Germany, and is the seat of the commune of Welden. Since the local government reform in 1978 it comprises Welden, Reutern and Ehgatten.

== Geography ==
Welden lies at the centre of the Holzwinkel landscape in Augsburg-West forestry natural park.

Welden and Ehgatten are situated on the Laugna which supplies the Zusam. Reutern is on a hill between the Zusam and Laugna vallies.

== History ==
Welden was first mentioned in 1156. It was seat of the Lords of Welden who took their fief from the marquesses of Burgau. In 1402 the village became a "market". In 1597 the Fugger family acquired the estate which remained in the hand of the Fugger-Wellenburg branch until it extinguished in 1764, followed by the counts and princes of Fugger-Babenhausen. In 1806 Welden became part of the Kingdom of Bavaria. The monastery is still owned by the Fugger family foundation.

During the local government reform of 1978, the commune of Reutern was added to Welden as was Ehgatten, which belonged to the commune of Streitheim (now belonging to Zusmarshausen community). Before 1978, Ehgatten's parish and school was governed by Welden.

== Politics ==
=== Mayor ===
Mayors since the local government reform of 1978:

Year	Mayor	Candidate
2026	Stefan Scheider	FWV
2020	Stefan Scheider	FWV/WiR
2014	Peter Bergmeir	SPD/FWV
2008	Peter Bergmeir	SPD/FWV
2002	Peter Bergmeir	SPD/FWV
1996	Peter Bergmeir	SPD
1990	Peter Bergmeir	SPD
1984	Hermann Schmid	CSU
1978	Hermann Schmid	CSU/SPD

Since 2020, Günter Lewentat (Bürgergemeinschaft) has been the deputy mayor.

=== Local Council ===
Local council elections since the 1978 reform:

Year	SPD	CSU	Bürgergemeinschaft	Free voters	REP	Liste WiR	ÖDP	AFD	Total
2026	-	4	5	4	-	2	1	-	16
2020	-	5	4	3	-	2	1	1	16
2014	5	4	4	3	-	-	-	-	16
2008	5	4	3	4	-	-	-	-	16
2002	5	4	4	3	-	-	-	-	16
1996	4	4	5	3	-	-	-	-	16
1990	4	6	3	2	1	-	-	-	16
1984	3	5	3	3	-	-	-	-	14
1978	2	6	2	4	-	-	-	-	14

== Culture and Places of Interest ==
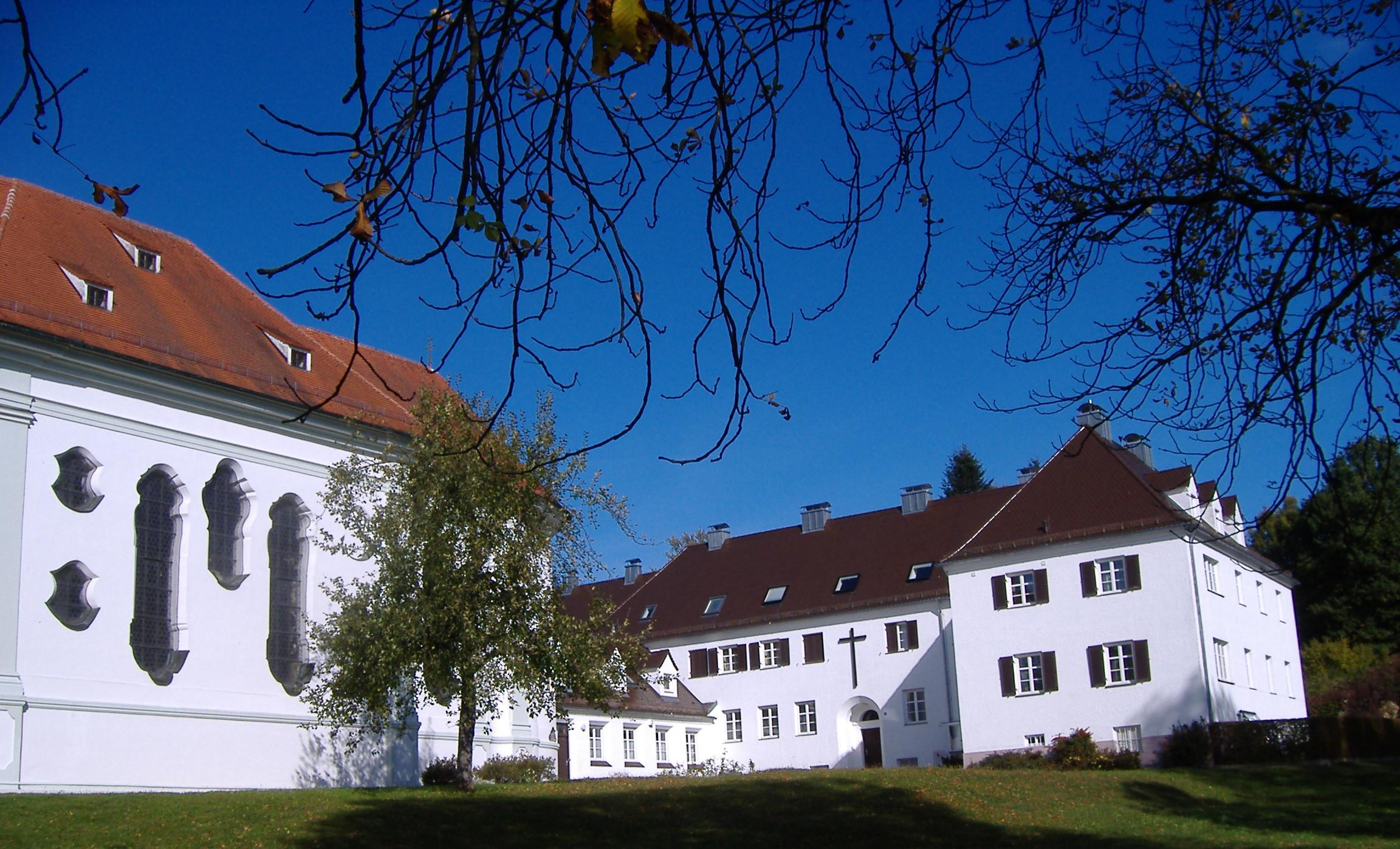
Church of the Annunciation and monastery

- St. Thekla church
- Church of the Annunciation of the Virgin Mary contains early frescoes by 18th century painter Matthäus Günther

In addition to its historic churches, Welden features several cultural attractions dedicated to the prominent author Ludwig Ganghofer, who spent part of his childhood in the town. These include the Ganghofer-Stätte (a dedicated memorial site) and Ganghofers Lausbubenweg, a themed adventure trail designed for families and hikers. The town is also known for its open-air stage (Freilichtbühne Welden), which hosts local theatrical productions and community events.

== Notable citizens ==
The author Ludwig Ganghofer spent a significant part of his childhood (1859–1865) in Welden.
