= Heretsried =

- Municipality
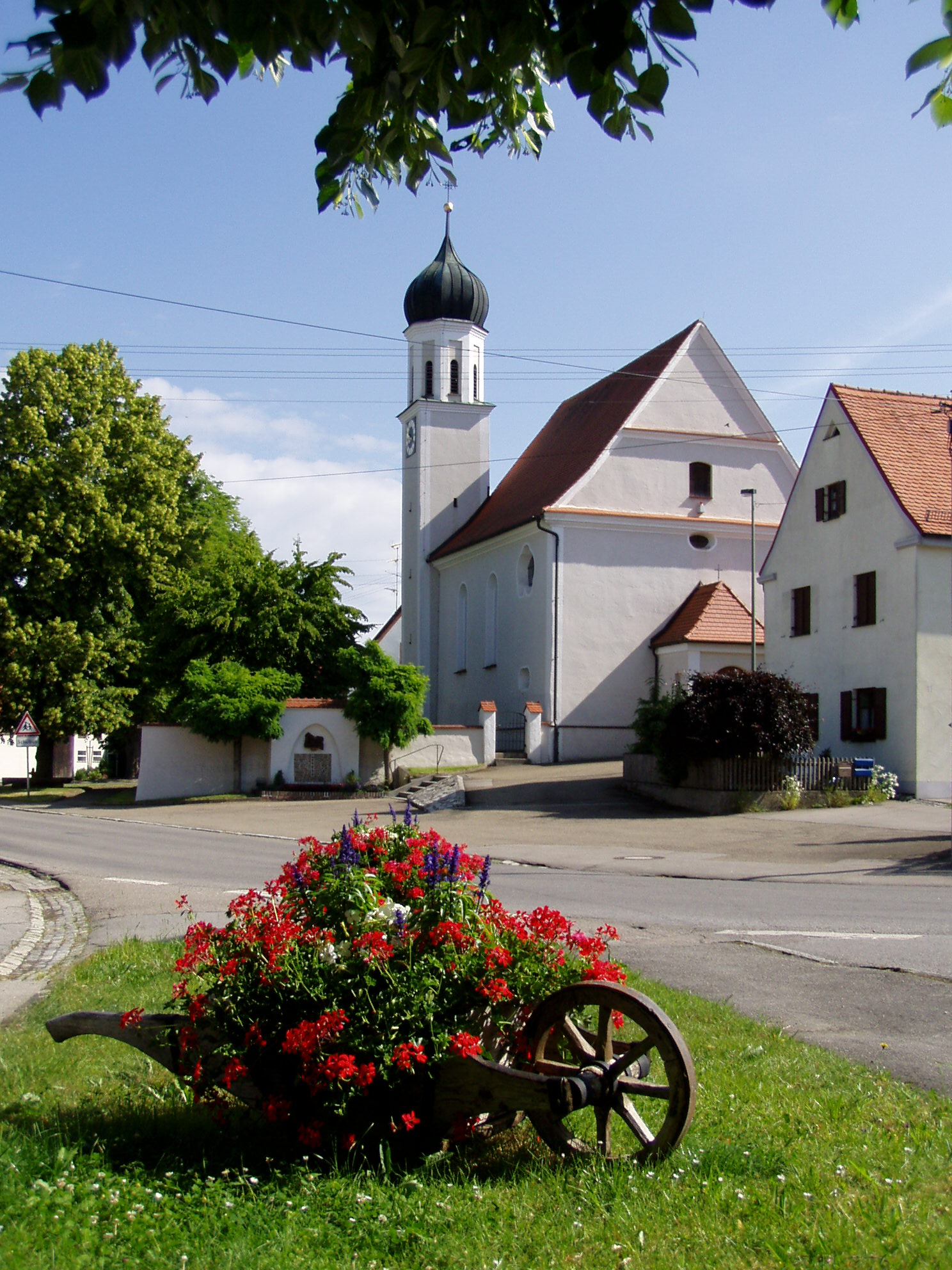
- Church of Saint Martin

- Coat of arms

- Location of Heretsried within Augsburg district
- Interactive map of Heretsried
- Location within Germany Location within Bavaria
- Coordinates: 48°28′N 10°44′E
- Country: Germany
- State: Bavaria
- Admin. region: Schwaben
- District: Augsburg
- Municipal assoc.: Welden

Government
  - Mayor (2020–26): Heinrich Jäckle

Area
  - Total: 17.31 km^{2} (6.68 sq mi)
- Elevation: 515 m (1,690 ft)

Population (2025-12-31)
  - Total: 1,048
  - Density: 60.54/km^{2} (156.8/sq mi)
- Time zone: UTC+01:00 (CET)
  - Summer (DST): UTC+02:00 (CEST)
- Postal codes: 86465
- Dialling codes: 08293
- Vehicle registration: A
- Website: www.heretsried.de

Heretsried is a municipality in the district of Augsburg in Bavaria in Germany.

== Geography ==
Heretsrieds' location is about 15 km north-east of Augsburg in the so called Holzwinkel in Naturpark Augsburg Westliche Wälder.

== History ==
Bishop Soboto of Augsburg incorporated Heretsried to Kloster Holzen in 1242. A bit of time ago it was found by a man called Heribrecht, who cleared the forest and found a village. In 1310, Heretsried became a free village although it was still part of the monastery of Holzen. This is provable by a deed of gift of Kloster Holzen. Therefore Heretsried became a parish seat. When the monastery of Holzen was in a financial crisis the abbess of Holzen sold Heretsried to Sebastian Ilsung, a rich citizen of Augsburg for 146 Gulden. Nevertheless Heretsried was sold back for 300 Gulden in 1484. When the peasants' war began around 1525 the peasantry of Heretsried didn't oppose the monastery of Holzen. They got wood and straw and were allowed to go hunting and angling. In 1636, in time of the thirty years' war, the church and the citizens' houses were burned down by the Swedish troops. The chronicle of Holzen told about abbess Agnes von Neuegg who found only 6 survivors in Heretsried. With big financial expenses she rebuilt the church of Heretsried. In 1805, Napoleon I fought a war against the Austrians. There were three French horseman shot by peasants who took the stolen money which came from a forest near Heretsried. There was a school in Heretsried found in 1853 and rebuilt in 1956. After World War II, Heretsried had 12 dead or missing soldiers. Since 1978, Heretsried and the nearby Lauterbrunn as well as Monburg formed the political community of Heretsried.
