= Buchdorf =

- Municipality
- Coat of arms

- Location of Buchdorf within Donau-Ries district
- Interactive map of Buchdorf
- Location within Germany Location within Bavaria
- Coordinates: 48°47′N 10°49′E
- Country: Germany
- State: Bavaria
- Admin. region: Schwaben
- District: Donau-Ries
- Municipal assoc.: Monheim

Government
  - Mayor (2020–26): Walter Grob

Area
  - Total: 16.66 km^{2} (6.43 sq mi)
- Elevation: 552 m (1,811 ft)

Population (2025-12-31)
  - Total: 2,060
  - Density: 124/km^{2} (320/sq mi)
- Time zone: UTC+01:00 (CET)
  - Summer (DST): UTC+02:00 (CEST)
- Postal codes: 86675
- Dialling codes: 09099
- Vehicle registration: DON
- Website: www.gemeinde-buchdorf.de

Buchdorf (German pronunciation: [ˈbuːxdɔʁf]) is a municipality in the district of Donau-Ries in Bavaria in Germany.

== See also ==
- Buchdahl
