= Holzheim =

Holzheim may refer to several places in Europe:

== Germany ==
=== Bavaria ===
- Holzheim, Dillingen, in the district of Dillingen
- Holzheim, Donau-Ries, in the Donau-Ries district
- Holzheim, Neu-Ulm, in the district of Neu-Ulm
- Holzheim am Forst, in the district of Regensburg

=== Rhineland-Palatinate ===
- Holzheim, Rhineland-Palatinate
- Holzheim Castle (Langerwehe), a castle in the district of Düren, north Rhineland-Westphalia

=== Hesse ===
- Holzheim (Haunetal), Hersfeld-Rotenburg district
- Schloss Holzheim (hunting seat) of King Frederick I of Sweden

== Belgium ==
- Holzheim (Büllingen), a village of Büllingen in Verviers, Liège
