= 20th Armored Division (United States) =

Armored unit of the United States army in World War II

- Shoulder sleeve insignia of the 20th Armored Division.
- Active: 24 November 1942–2 April 1946
- Country: United States
- Allegiance: United States Of America
- Branch: United States Army
- Type: Armored
- Role: Armor and Infantry tactics
- Size: Division
- Motto: Beware the Ides of March
- Colors: Red Yellow Blue
- Engagements: World War II; Central Europe

Commanders
- Notable commanders: Orlando Ward; Roderick R. Allen

Insignia
- Nicknames: Armoraiders; Liberators
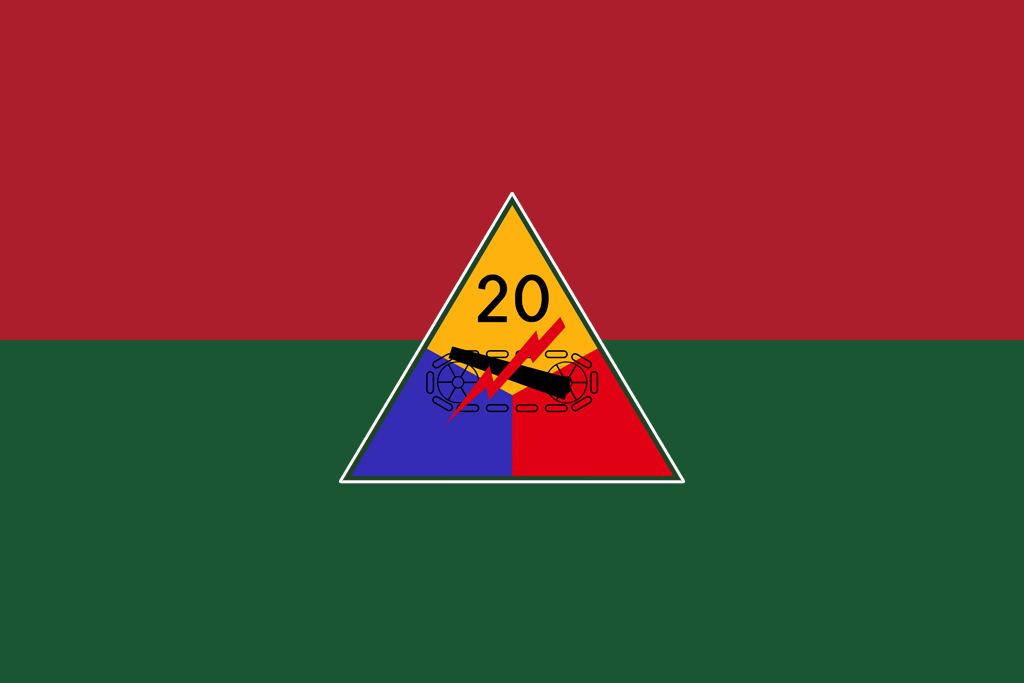
- Flag of the United States Army 20th Armored Division

The 20th Armored Division was an armored division of the United States Army that fought in World War II. It was activated on 15 March 1943 at Camp Campbell in Kentucky.

The division had no official name although it did associate itself with the nickname "Armoraiders" while in training at Camp Campbell. After certification as a liberating division by the US Army Center of Military History on 28 October 1988, and the awarding of a Liberation Certificate by the United States Holocaust Memorial Council, veterans of the division adopted the name Liberators.

== Division organization ==
=== Heavy armored division ===
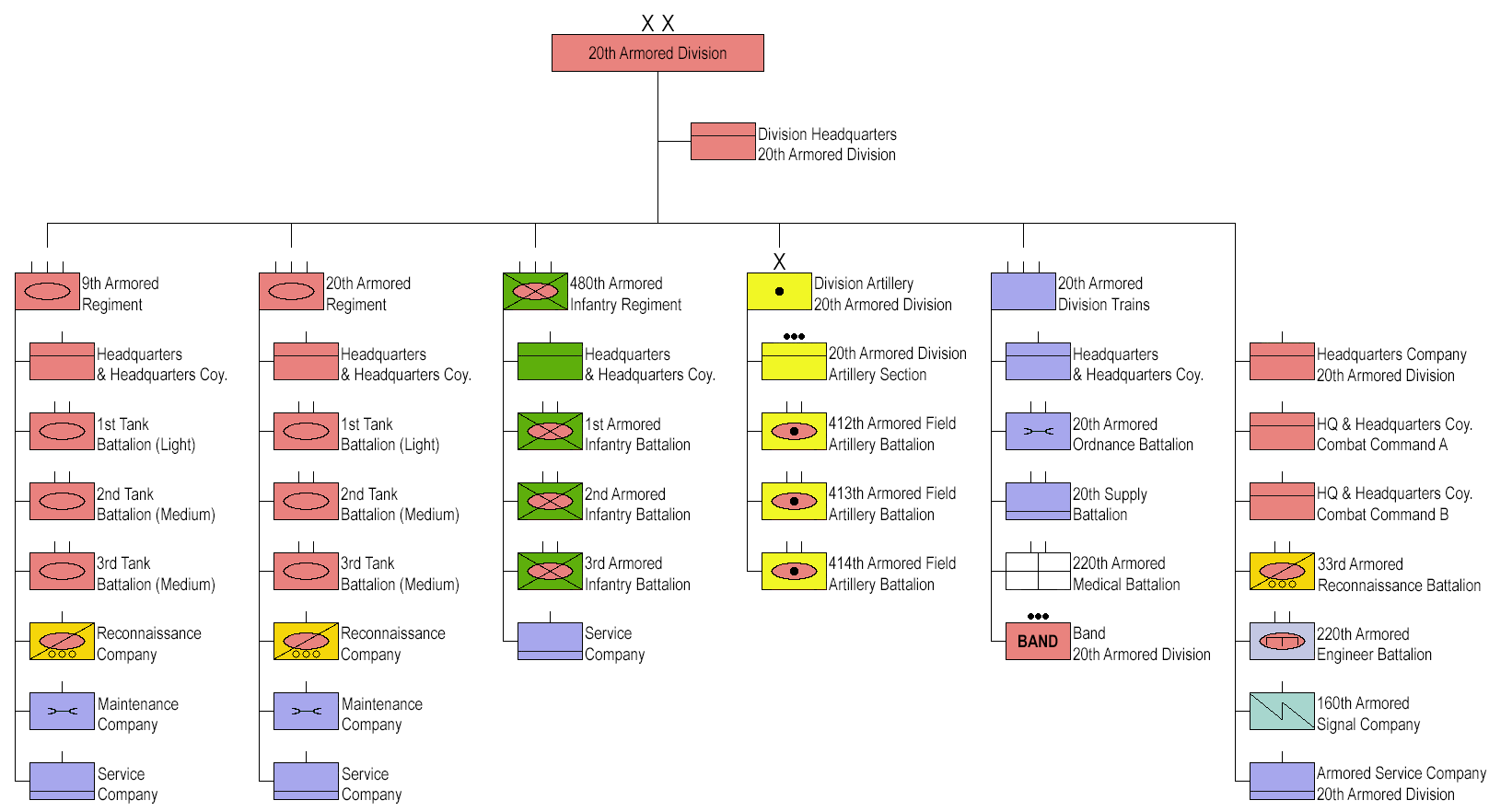
20th Armored Division organization after the division's activation (click to enlarge)

The division was activated as a heavy armored division in the Army of the United States in 1942. At the time the 20th Armored Division was composed of the following units:

- 20th Armored Division
  - Division Headquarters
  - Headquarters Company, 20th Armored Division
  - Headquarters and Headquarters Company, Combat Command A
  - Headquarters and Headquarters Company, Combat Command B
  - 160th Armored Signal Company
  - Armored Service Company (includes the division's Military Police Platoon)
  - 9th Armored Regiment
    - Headquarters and Headquarters Company
    - Reconnaissance Company (M3 scout cars and T30 HMC self propelled guns)
    - Maintenance Company
    - Service Company
    - 1st Tank Battalion (Light)
      - Headquarters and Headquarters Company
      - 3× Light Tank companies (A, B, C) (M3/M5 Stuart light tanks)
    - 2nd Tank Battalion (Medium)
      - Headquarters and Headquarters Company
      - 3× Medium Tank companies (D, E, F) (M4 Sherman tanks)
    - 3rd Tank Battalion (Medium)
      - Headquarters and Headquarters Company
      - 3× Medium Tank companies (G, H, I) (M4 Sherman tanks)
  - 20th Armored Regiment
    - same organization as 9th Armored Regiment
  - 480th Armored Infantry Regiment
    - Headquarters and Headquarters Company
    - 3× Armored infantry battalions
      - each battalion consists of: 1× Headquarters and Headquarters Company, 3× Rifle companies on M3 half-tracks
    - Service Company
  - 33rd Armored Reconnaissance Battalion
    - Headquarters and Headquarters Company
    - 3× Reconnaissance companies (M3 scout cars)
    - Light Tank Company (M3/M5 Stuart light tanks)
  - 220th Armored Engineer Battalion
    - Headquarters and Headquarters Company
    - 4× Armored engineer companies
    - Bridge Company
  - 20th Armored Division Artillery
    - 20th Armored Division Artillery Section
    - 412th Armored Field Artillery Battalion
      - Headquarters and Headquarters Battery
      - 3× Field artillery batteries (M7 Priest self propelled howitzers)
      - Service Battery
    - 413th Armored Field Artillery Battalion
      - same organization as 412th Armored Field Artillery Battalion
    - 414th Armored Field Artillery Battalion
      - same organization as 412th Armored Field Artillery Battalion
  - 20th Armored Division Trains
    - Headquarters and Headquarters Company
    - 20th Armored Ordnance Battalion
      - Headquarters and Headquarters Company
      - 3× Maintenance companies
    - 20th Supply Battalion
      - Headquarters and Headquarters Company
      - 2× Truck companies
    - 220th Armored Medical Battalion
      - Headquarters and Headquarters Company
      - 3× Medical companies
    - 20th Armored Division Band

=== Light armored division ===
Early in 1943, the Army Ground Force began a series of studies to reorganize the various divisions within the Army. After reviewing the tables of organization and after allowing the various commands to review and comment on the proposed restructure, the War Department published on 15 September 1943 a new armored division tables of organization. The restructuring removed the two armored regiments and armored infantry regiment from the table of organization and replaced them with three tank battalions and three armored infantry battalions. Each tank battalion included one light and three medium tank companies. Both Combat Commands, A and B, remained, but an additional Reserve Command was added to the organization. This was a small headquarters element of 10 personnel tasked to clarify command and control in the division's rear area. Armored engineer battalions lost their bridge companies, while their engineer companies were reduced from four to three. The division's cavalry reconnaissance squadron was increased in size to include an HQ Troop, four reconnaissance troops, a light tank company, and an assault gun troop of four platoons (one for each reconnaissance troop). Within the division trains, the division lost its supply battalion and the division's armored service company. These changes pared the division's strength from 14,630 men to 10,937, slashed the number of tanks from 360 to 263, reduced the variety of vehicles to ease repair problems, and eliminated the maintenance-prone motorcycles.

After its reorganization as a light armored division the 20th Armored Division was composed of the following units:

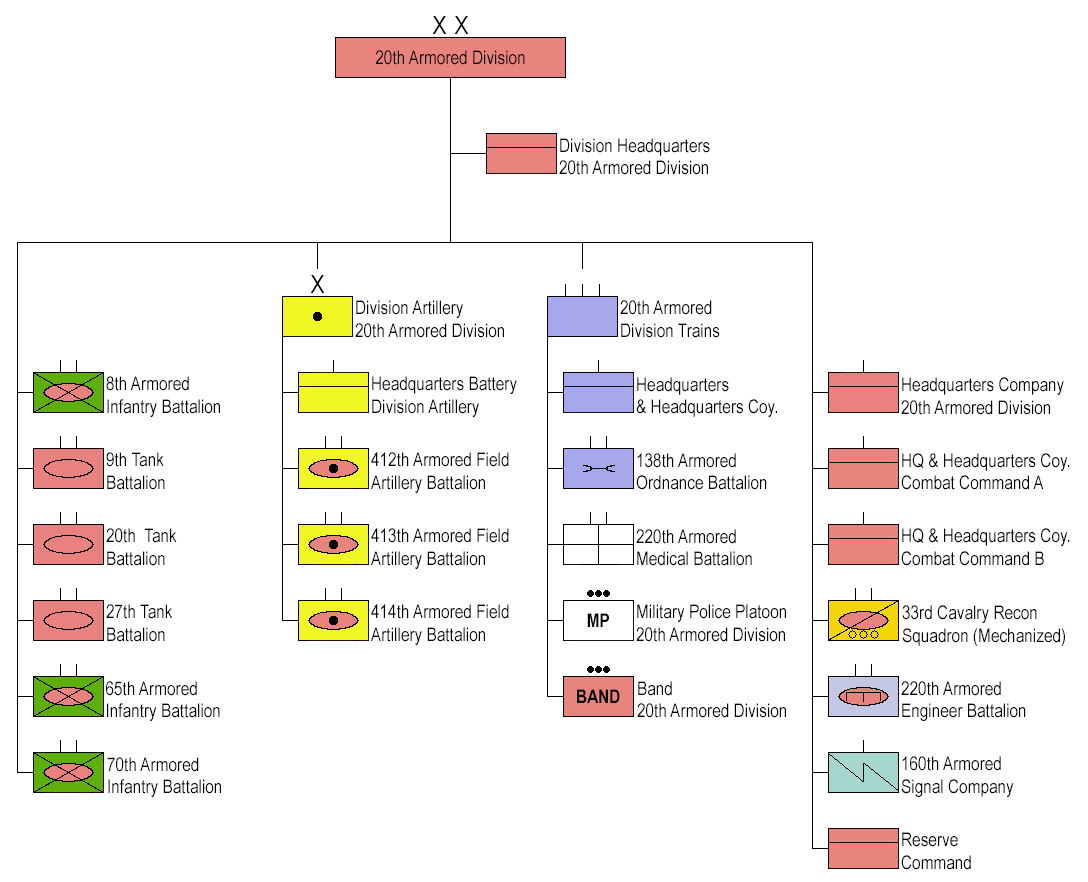
20th Armored Division organization after the division's reorganization (click to enlarge)

- 20th Armored Division
  - Division Headquarters
  - Headquarters Company, 20th Armored Division
  - Headquarters and Headquarters Company, Combat Command A
  - Headquarters and Headquarters Company, Combat Command B
  - 160th Armored Signal Company
  - Reserve Command
  - 9th Tank Battalion
    - Headquarters and Headquarters Company
    - 3× Medium Tank companies (M4 Sherman tanks)
    - Light Tank Company (M3/M5 Stuart or M24 Chaffee light tanks)
    - Service Company
  - 20th Tank Battalion
    - same organization as 9th Tank Battalion
  - 27th Tank Battalion
    - same organization as 9th Tank Battalion
  - 8th Armored Infantry Battalion
    - Headquarters and Headquarters Company
    - 3× Rifle companies (M3 half-tracks)
    - Service Company
  - 65th Armored Infantry Battalion
    - same organization as 8th Armored Infantry Battalion
  - 70th Armored Infantry Battalion
    - same organization as 8th Armored Infantry Battalion
  - 33rd Cavalry Reconnaissance Squadron (Mechanized)
    - Headquarters and Headquarters and Service Troop
    - 4× Cavalry reconnaissance troops (M8 Greyhound armored cars)
    - Cavalry Assault Gun Troop (M8 Scott self propelled guns)
    - Light Tank Company (M3/M5 Stuart or M24 Chaffee light tanks)
  - 220th Armored Engineer Battalion
    - Headquarters and Headquarters Company
    - 3× Armored engineer companies
  - 20th Armored Division Artillery
    - Headquarters and Headquarters Battery
    - 412th Armored Field Artillery Battalion
      - Headquarters and Headquarters Battery
      - 3× Field artillery batteries (M7 Priest self propelled howitzers)
      - Service Battery
    - 413th Armored Field Artillery Battalion
      - same organization as 412th Armored Field Artillery Battalion
    - 414th Armored Field Artillery Battalion
      - same organization as 412th Armored Field Artillery Battalion
  - 20th Armored Division Trains
    - Headquarters and Headquarters Company
    - 138th Armored Ordnance Battalion
      - Headquarters and Headquarters Company
      - 3× Maintenance companies
    - 220th Armored Medical Battalion
      - Headquarters and Headquarters Company
      - 3× Medical companies
    - Military Police Platoon
    - 20th Armored Division Band

== History ==
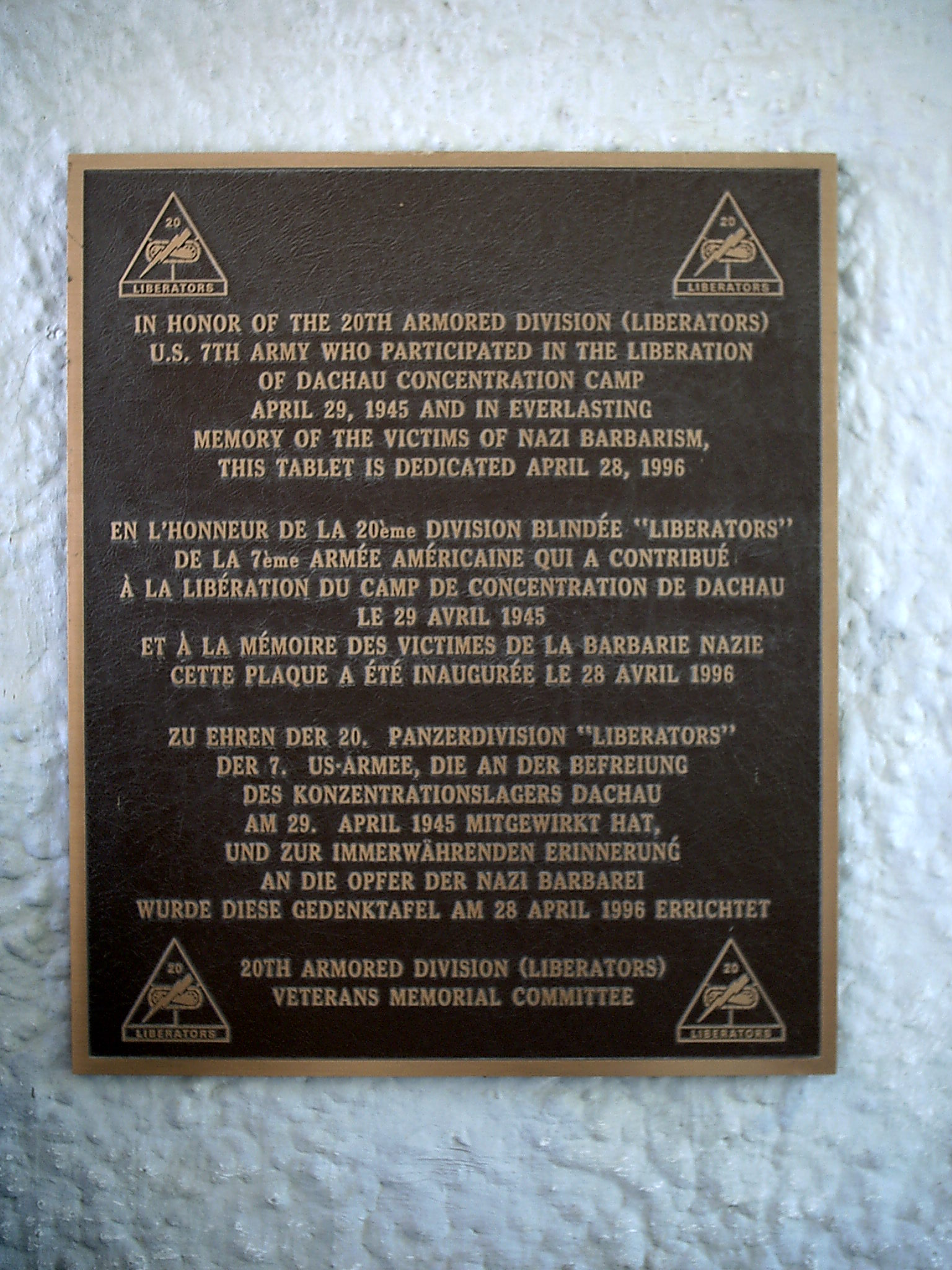
Plaque at Dachau concentration camp honoring the 20th Armored Division and displaying the moniker 'Liberators'.

The 20th Armored Division departed Boston on 6 February and arrived at Le Havre, France, 19 February 1945. On arrival it was sent to Buchy for a month's assembly, preparation, and additional training. It then moved through Belgium to Langendernbach, Germany, 10 April. After considering breaking up the new division to provide replacements for the veteran armored divisions under his 12th U.S. Army Group, General Omar N. Bradley, sent the unit to Marktbreit, where the Division was attached to the III Corps; 20 April. Three days later, it was detached and reassigned to the XV Corps, Seventh Army, at Würzburg, Germany.

The condition of the Division when it arrived overseas was affected by a recent change in its primary mission. Until October 1944, the 20th Armored Division's mission was to train soldiers and qualify them for overseas shipment as combat replacements for armored units. To perform this mission, the Division included in its strength an unusually large number of intelligent and highly trained men, including students from several of the Army's advanced college training programs.

=== Combat chronicle ===
The actual arrival of the 20th Armored Division into combat occurred 4–9 April 1945. The division's armored field artillery battalions (the 412th, 413th, and 414th), with elements of the 33rd Cavalry Reconnaissance Squadron, moved up to the west bank of the Rhine River to support the 101st Airborne Division near Delhoven, Germany, and the 82nd Airborne Division across the river from Hitdorf, Germany. It was the 412th that supported the 82nd in their attack on Hitdorf that resulted in the awarding of a Distinguished Unit Citation.

Overlooking the above, incomplete official records minimize the Division's perceived combat activity, i.e., citing: Elements of the division first saw action as Task Force Campbell when a false surrender by the enemy resulted in fighting in the town of Dorf, 25 April.

At that time, the Division assembled near Deiningen and reconnoitered for routes to the Danube River. The 20th Armored Division's 27th Tank Battalion (a component of Combat Command R) was attached to the veteran 42nd Infantry Division on 23 April 1945 and led the attack to capture the town of Donauwörth on the 25th to secure the crossing of the Danube. The river was crossed on 28 April, the 20th meeting sporadic resistance. The success of the operation prompted Lt. Col. Donald E. Downard, commanding officer of the 2nd Battalion, 222nd Infantry (42nd Infantry Division) who had witnessed more than 25 months of combat, to state: "I have never seen a more aggressive armored unit." Subsequently, elements of the 20th seized the bridge over the Paar River at Schrobenhausen, and secured crossings over the Ilm River.

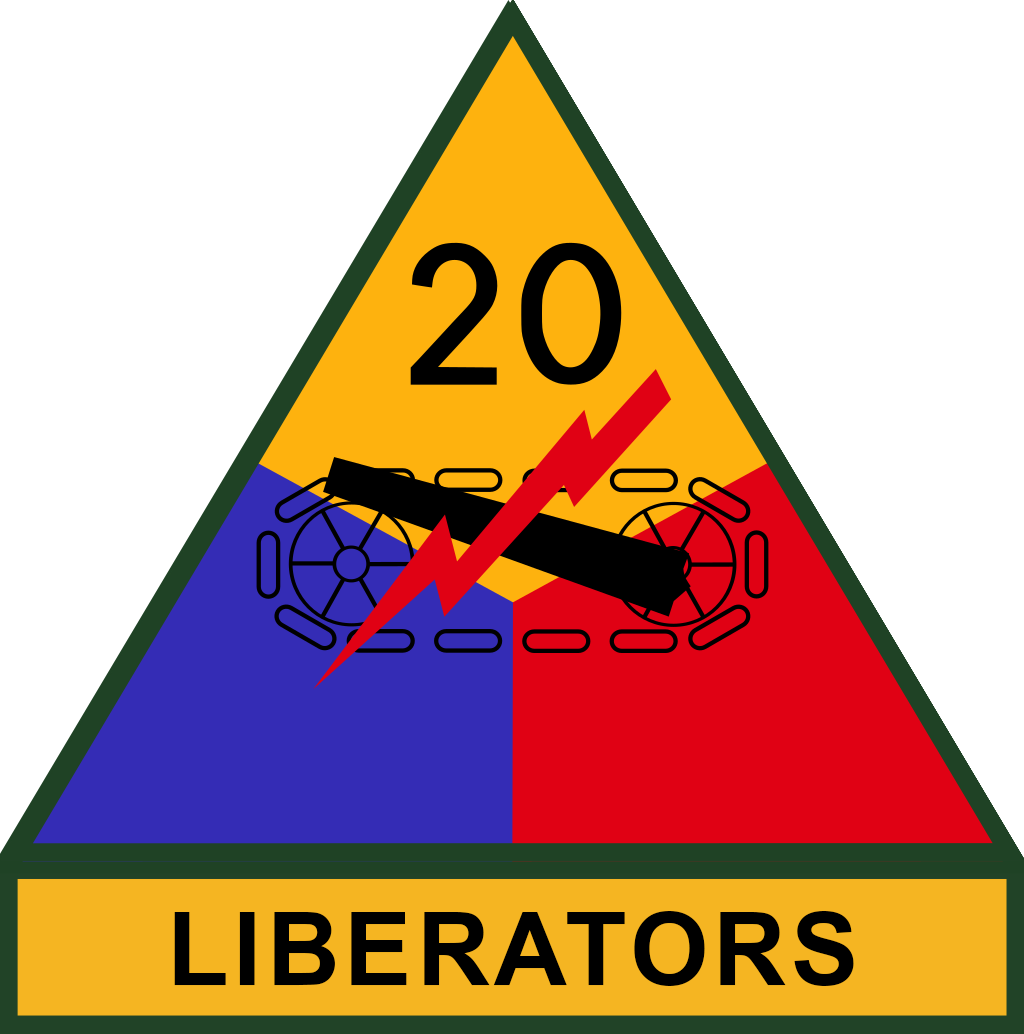
20th Armored Division "Liberators" Insignia

Elements of the 20th Armored Division, along with those of the U.S. Seventh Army's 45th (Thunderbird) and 42nd (Rainbow) Infantry Divisions, participated in the liberation of Dachau concentration camp on 29 April 1945. While anecdotal reports indicate varied 20th AD troops took part in the unfolding process of discovery and liberation of the camp, ultimately it was the above attachment of elements of the 27th Tank Battalion to those of the 42nd Infantry Division on which the 20th Armored would be jointly recognized by the US Army Center for Military History (CMH) and the United States Holocaust Memorial Museum (USHMM) as an official Liberating unit. The Division and its flag were subsequently added to USHMM displays and were cited online there and elsewhere.

Meanwhile, in support of units of the 45th Infantry Division (primarily belonging to the 180th and 157th Infantry Regiments), elements of the 20th Armored Division's Combat Command B (including certain forces of the 20th Tank Battalion, 65th Armored Infantry Battalion, and 413th Armored Field Artillery Battalion), operating together as Task Force 20, were awarded a Distinguished Unit Citation for their collective action in the Central European (Southern Germany) Campaign. The Recommendation for Unit Citation, dated 3 October 1945, states:

These units, which constituted Task Force 20, are cited for outstanding performance of duty in action during the period 28–30 April 1945, in the vicinity of Neuherberg, Germany. With soldierly courage and irrepressible determination members of Task Force 20 pushed an armored spearhead 45 miles beyond the Danube River to the outskirts of Munich, destroying a supply train, capturing almost 800 prisoners, and securing four bridges over the Amper River intact. Continuing the attack on 29–30 April against an enemy entrenched in elaborately prepared dugouts and behind the thick walls of the SS Training Center and an Anti-tank School which were defended by small arms, machine guns, hundreds of panzerfausts and twelve 88 mm guns, our troops killed 700 SS Troops, who fought stubbornly and fanatically. This victory destroyed the defenses of Munich, Germany, removing resistance to the entry of troops into the City.

The 27th Tank Battalion remained attached to the 42nd Infantry Division during its attack on Munich, 29–30 April. Despite its recent efficacy in the combat zone, the rest of the 20th was ordered off the roads leading into Munich on 28 April, allowing the veteran 42nd (Rainbow) and 45th (Thunderbird) Infantry Divisions to capture Munich proper.

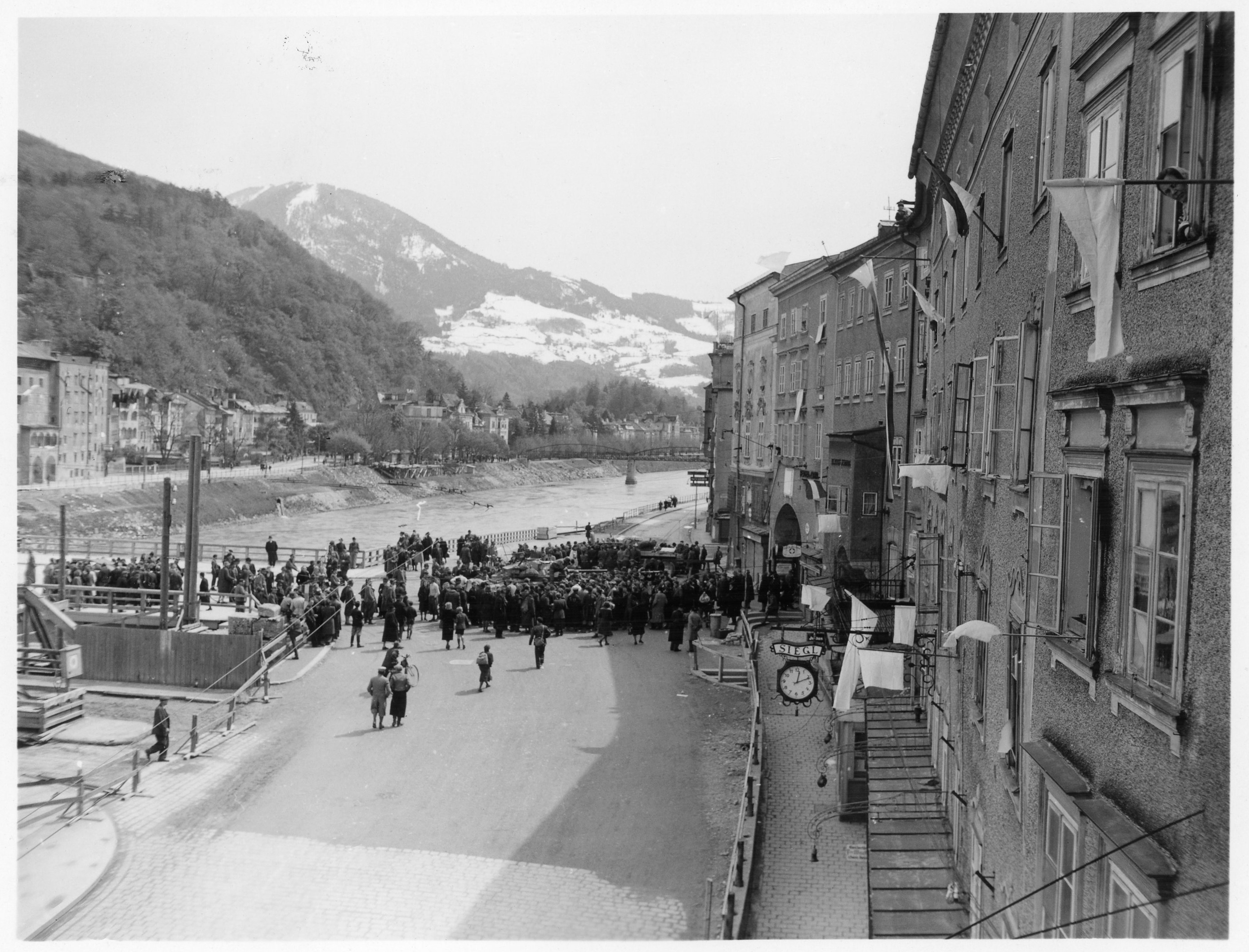
Tanks of the United States Army 20th Armored Division are greeted by the people of Salzburg on 3 May 1945

In pursuit of retreating German troops and prevention of a feared German National Redoubt in the Austrian Alps, elements of the 20th Armored (primarily of Combat Command A) crossed the Inn River at Wasserburg on 3 May, entered Traunstein on 4 May, and had entered Salzburg when it received word that hostilities would cease in Europe.

Following V-E Day, the Division performed Occupation duties, returning to the U.S. in August 1945, slated for participation in the then-planned invasion of Japan. The Division reported to Camp Cooke, CA, for amphibious assault training, but after the atomic bombs were dropped and Japan surrendered, the unit was inactivated on 2 April 1946 at Camp Hood in Texas.

Officially, the Division is erroneously credited with only eight days in combat (overlooking the previously described Rhine action)

Peanuts creator, Charles Schulz, rose to the rank of Staff Sergeant (and Light Machine Gun Squad Leader) while a member of the Division's 8th Armored Infantry Battalion. While Schulz's unit was nearby, it did not actually enter Dachau. Richard Nixon's future Vice President, Spiro Agnew, attained the rank of 1st Lieutenant while with the 20th Armored Division's 480th Armored Infantry Regiment (prior to reorganization to light armored division TO&E).

=== Casualties ===
- Total battle casualties: 186
- Killed in action: 46
- Wounded in action: 134
- Missing in action: 1
- Prisoners of war: 5
