= Asbach-Bäumenheim =

- Municipality
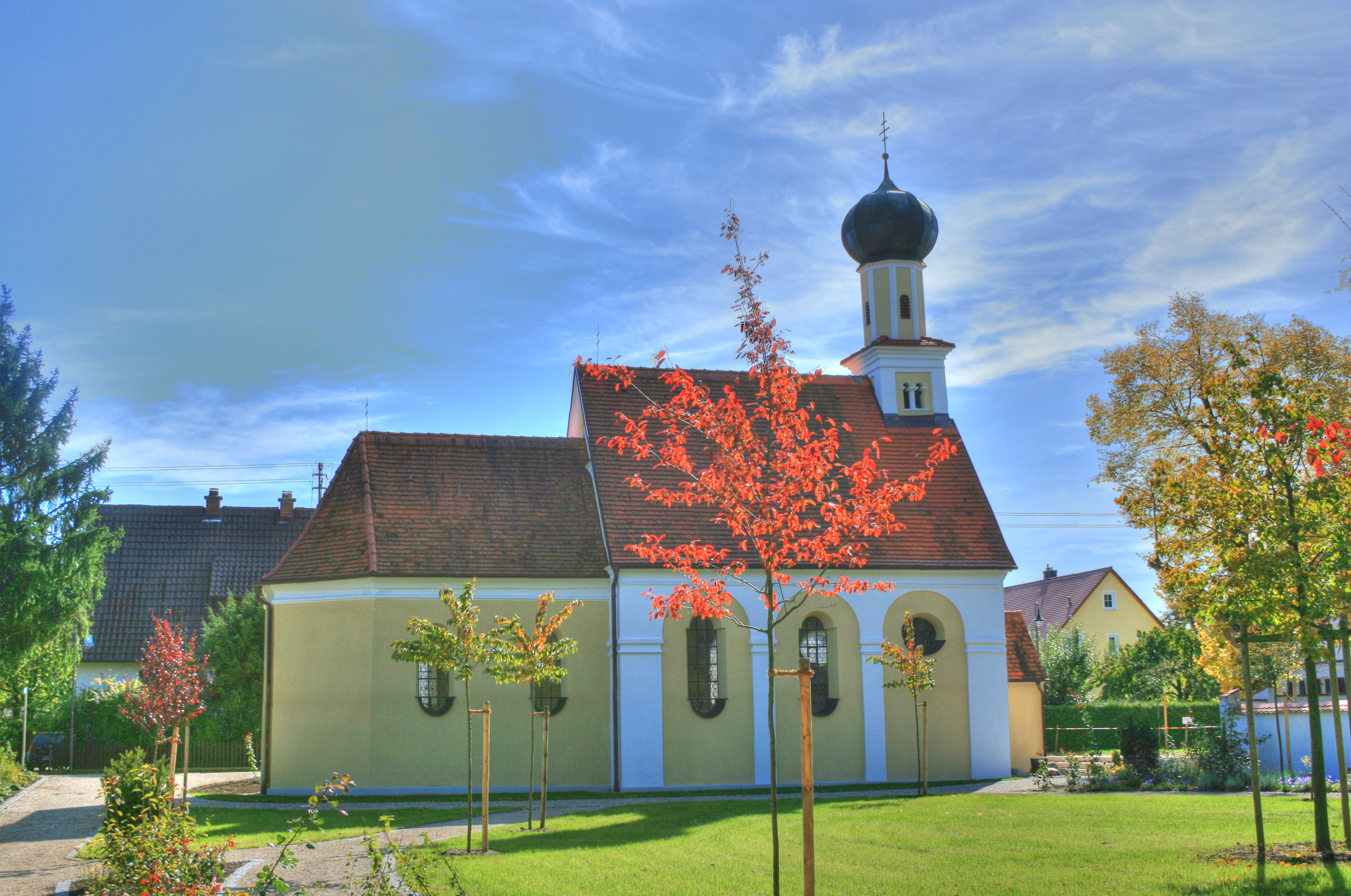
- Church of Saint Anthony of Padua in Bäumenheim

- Coat of arms

- Location of Asbach-Bäumenheim within Donau-Ries district
- Interactive map of Asbach-Bäumenheim
- Location within Germany Location within Bavaria
- Coordinates: 48°41′N 10°49′E
- Country: Germany
- State: Bavaria
- Admin. region: Schwaben
- District: Donau-Ries

Government
  - Mayor (2020–26): Martin Paninka (SPD)

Area
  - Total: 11.89 km^{2} (4.59 sq mi)
- Elevation: 404 m (1,325 ft)

Population (2025-12-31)
  - Total: 4,777
  - Density: 401.8/km^{2} (1,041/sq mi)
- Time zone: UTC+01:00 (CET)
  - Summer (DST): UTC+02:00 (CEST)
- Postal codes: 86663
- Dialling codes: 0906
- Vehicle registration: DON
- Website: www.asbach-baeumenheim.de

Asbach-Bäumenheim is a municipality in the district of Donau-Ries in Bavaria in Germany.

== Geography ==
=== Districts ===
- Asbach
- Bäumenheim
- Hamlar
- Meyfried
- Königsmühle

== History ==
=== Beginnings ===
Even in the early Bronze Age, the plain between the Donau and Lech was inhabited, as evidenced by the discovery of a skeleton grave near Hamlar. During Roman times, the Via Claudia Augusta leading through the present municipality area.

=== 1250 – Thirty Years' War ===
Around 1250 the hamlet Baebenheim (home of Babo), is mentioned in documents Aspach and Hamel. The districts developed only slowly over time and the manorial system was highly fragmented. Its proximity to the Empire care Wörth (Donauwörth) a strong dependence was given. Marcus Fugger acquired by Nikolaus Fugger and parts of the town. In the Thirty Years' War were severe devastation wreaked by the Swedes under Gustav II Adolf.

=== 1739–1844 ===
The Bavarian Elector 1739, the empire bought and care they remained until 1806 a separate territory. In 1818 the municipal Asbach was founded.

Until 19th century were the places insignificant hamlet. In 1844, the Ludwig south–north railway opened directly through the site. During this time, was opened by Max Drossbach Bäumenheim in a linen mill. Thus Bäumenheim developed in the industrial town a short time.

=== Second World War and postwar time ===
During the Second World War, a part of the Messerschmitt-Company was moved into the village. From August 1944 to April 1945 was on the site of today's company Dechentreiter the outer bearing Asbach-Bäumenheim. The approximately 500 concentration camp inmates had to perform forced labor in the production of armaments. While a bomb attack on 19 March 1945, an unknown number of concentration camp prisoners died. There is a memorial stone which reminds of the victims.

In 1958 the village was named Asbach-Bäumenheim.

== Mayors ==
- since 2014: Martin Paninka (SPD)
- Otto Uhl (2002–2014) (CSU)
- Hans Eichhorn (1978–2002) (CSU)

== Economy and Infrastructure ==
In Asbach-Bäumenheim there are two big companies:

- AGCO Fendt with 1000 employees
- Grenzebach Maschinenbau (in the district Hamlar)

=== Traffic ===
Through the town lead the two main roads and railway lines Nürnberg-Augsburg and Donauwörth-Ingolstadt. The station is on the railway between Nuremberg and Augsburg, the regional rail stops in both directions every hour. The train station in Hamlar will only be used as an operating station. There are no more scheduled passenger trains.

The special airfield Donauwörth-Genderkingen lies partly in the municipal area.
