= Rögling =

- Municipality
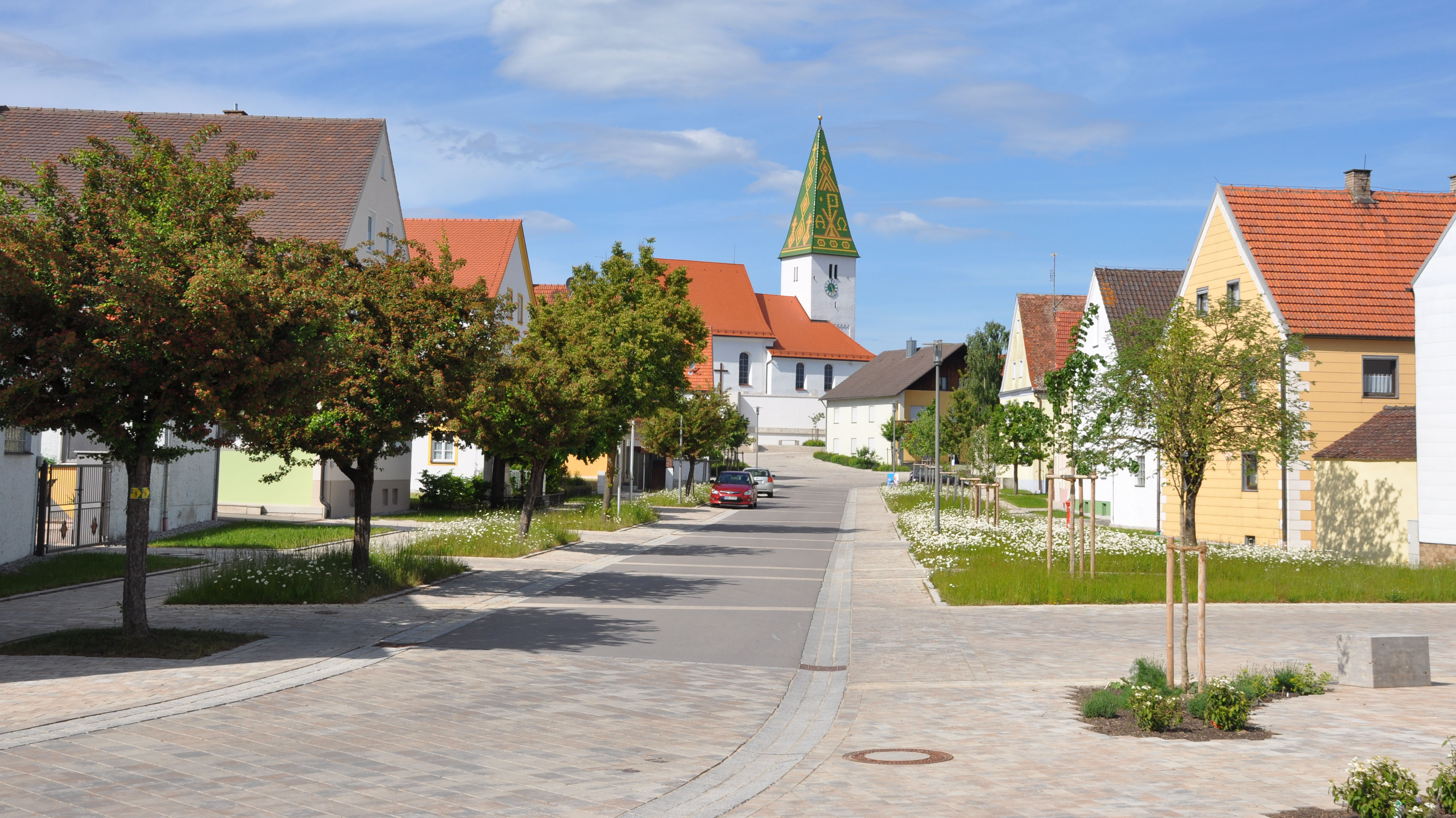
- Center of the village

- Coat of arms

- Location of Rögling within Donau-Ries district
- Interactive map of Rögling
- Location within Germany Location within Bavaria
- Coordinates: 48°51′N 10°57′E
- Country: Germany
- State: Bavaria
- Admin. region: Schwaben
- District: Donau-Ries
- Municipal assoc.: Monheim

Government
  - Mayor (2020–26): Isidor Auernhammer

Area
  - Total: 10.73 km^{2} (4.14 sq mi)
- Elevation: 530 m (1,740 ft)

Population (2025-12-31)
  - Total: 602
  - Density: 56.1/km^{2} (145/sq mi)
- Time zone: UTC+01:00 (CET)
  - Summer (DST): UTC+02:00 (CEST)
- Postal codes: 86703
- Dialling codes: 09094
- Vehicle registration: DON
- Website: www.roegling.de

Rögling is a municipality in the district of Donau-Ries in Bavaria in Germany.
