= Amerdingen =

- Municipality
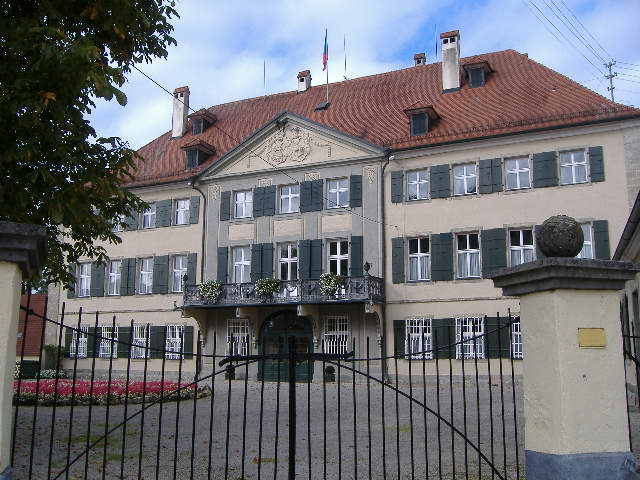
- Amerdingen Castle

- Coat of arms

- Location of Amerdingen within Donau-Ries district
- Interactive map of Amerdingen
- Location within Germany Location within Bavaria
- Coordinates: 48°44′N 10°29′E
- Country: Germany
- State: Bavaria
- Admin. region: Schwaben
- District: Donau-Ries
- Municipal assoc.: Ries

Government
  - Mayor (2020–26): Xaver Berchtenbreiter

Area
  - Total: 19.10 km^{2} (7.37 sq mi)
- Elevation: 502–561 m (1,647–1,841 ft)

Population (2025-12-31)
  - Total: 854
  - Density: 44.7/km^{2} (116/sq mi)
- Time zone: UTC+01:00 (CET)
  - Summer (DST): UTC+02:00 (CEST)
- Postal codes: 86735
- Dialling codes: 09089
- Vehicle registration: DON
- Website: www.amerdingen.de

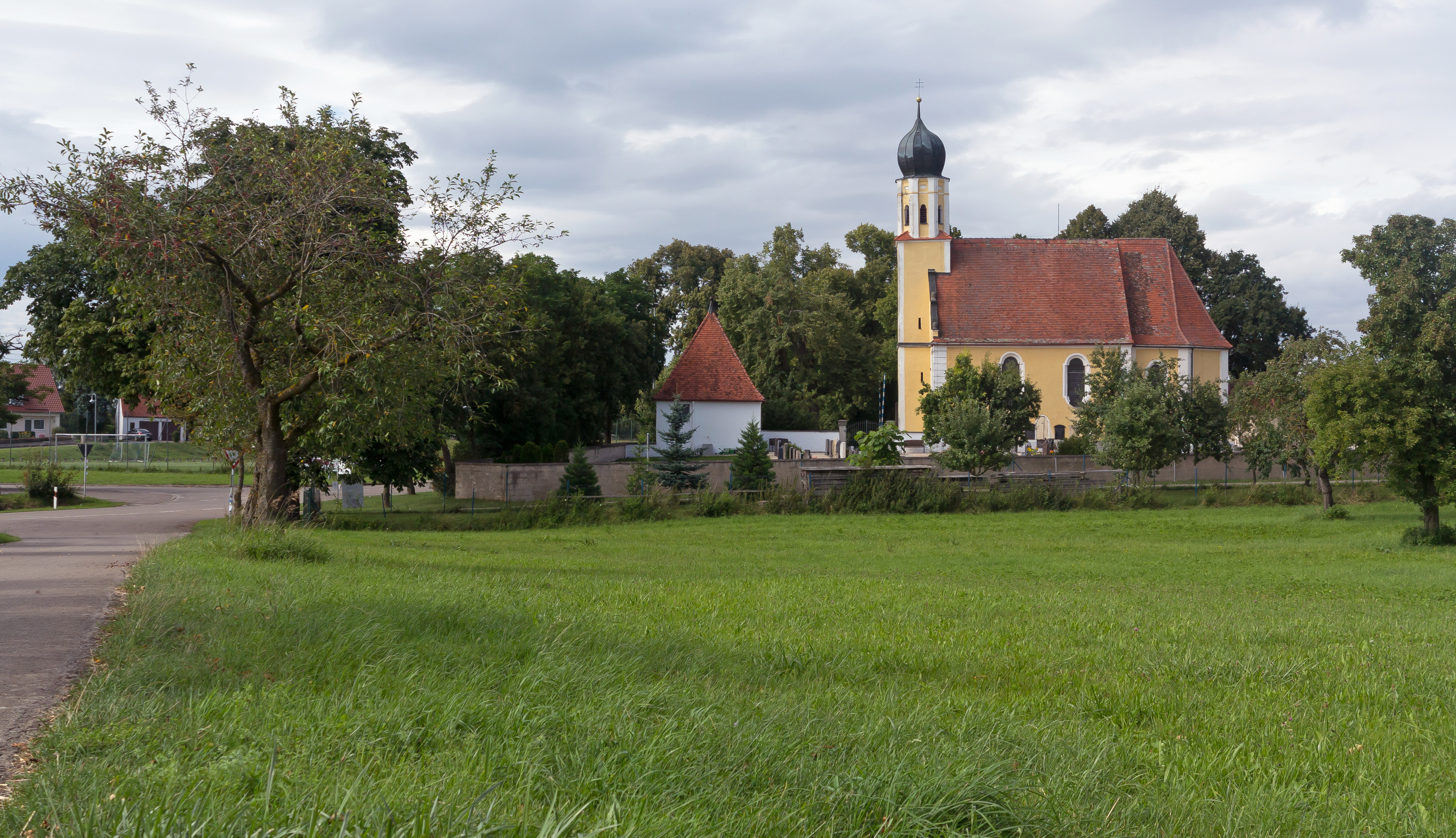
Church of Saint Vitus

Amerdingen is a municipality in the district of Donau-Ries in Bavaria in Germany.

There is an 18th-century castle: Amerdingen Castle (classicist style). It was built by the known noble family of the Stauffenbergs. All living Stauffenbergs belong to the Amerdingen line of this clan. Today Count Alfred Schenk von Stauffenberg (*1923) and his wife live there. Count Alfred is a nephew of Count Claus Schenk Graf von Stauffenberg who was the leading figure of the failed 20 July Plot of 1944 to kill German dictator Adolf Hitler.
