= Münster, Bavaria =

Münster
- Municipality
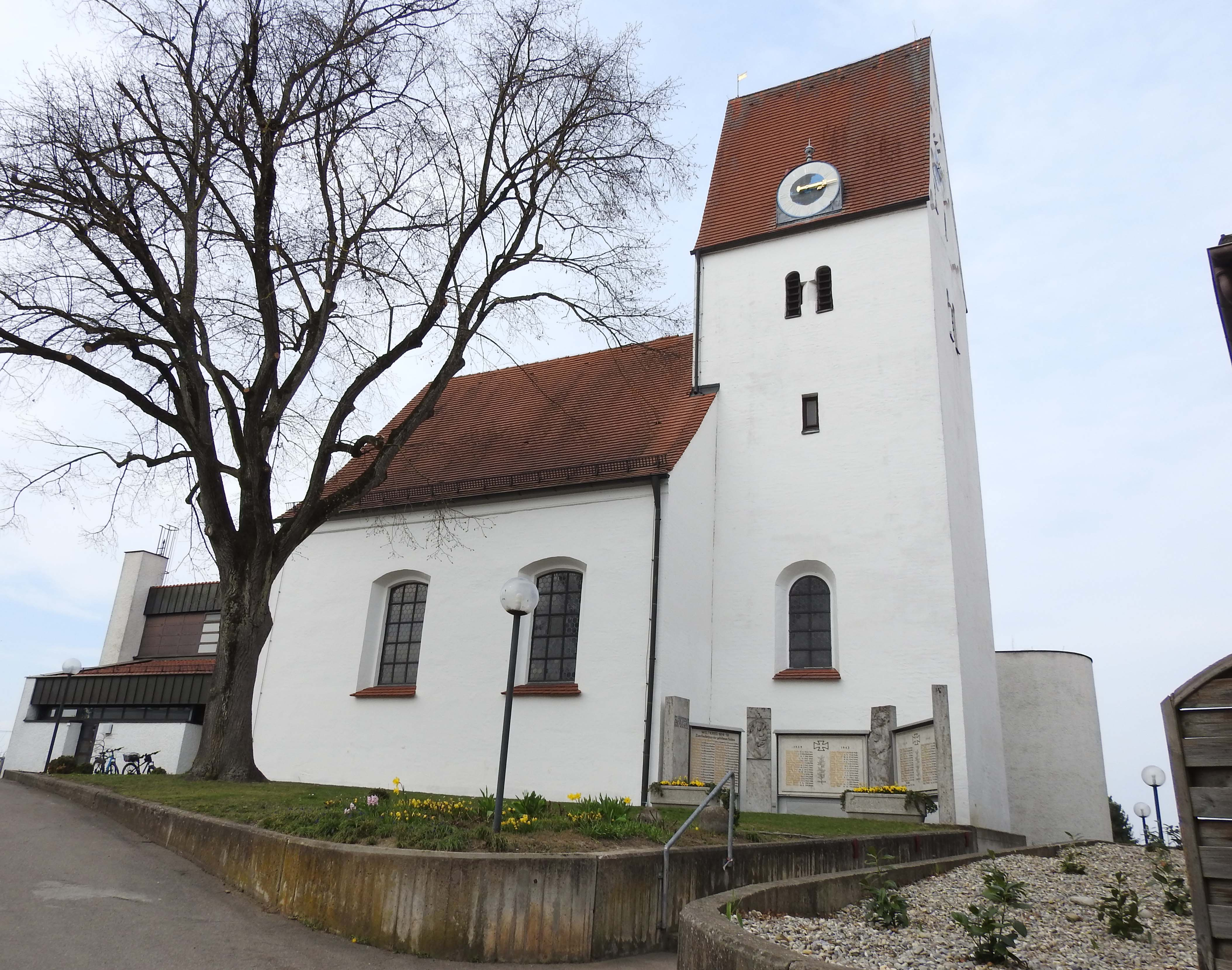
- Church of Saints Peter and Paul

- Coat of arms

- Location of Münster within Donau-Ries district
- Interactive map of Münster
- Location within Germany Location within Bavaria
- Coordinates: 48°38′N 10°54′E
- Country: Germany
- State: Bavaria
- Admin. region: Schwaben
- District: Donau-Ries
- Municipal assoc.: Rain

Government
  - Mayor (2020–26): Jürgen Raab

Area
  - Total: 17.72 km^{2} (6.84 sq mi)
- Elevation: 412–434 m (1,352–1,424 ft)

Population (2025-12-31)
  - Total: 1,226
  - Density: 69.19/km^{2} (179.2/sq mi)
- Time zone: UTC+01:00 (CET)
  - Summer (DST): UTC+02:00 (CEST)
- Postal codes: 86692
- Dialling codes: 08276
- Vehicle registration: DON
- Website: www.gemeinde-muenster.de

Münster (German pronunciation: [ˈmʏnstɐ]; Central Bavarian: Minschda am Leech) is a municipality in the district of Donau-Ries in Bavaria in Germany.

== Geography ==
Münster is located between Rain and Thierhaupten. The village is separated in a lower and a higher part, because it's built on the Lechrain.

== Coat of arms ==
On the coat of arms of Münster in the lower part a swung line, representing the river Lech, is drawn on red and silver ground. The key and sword stand for the two patron saints of the local parish St. Peter and Paul.
