= Maihingen =

- Municipality
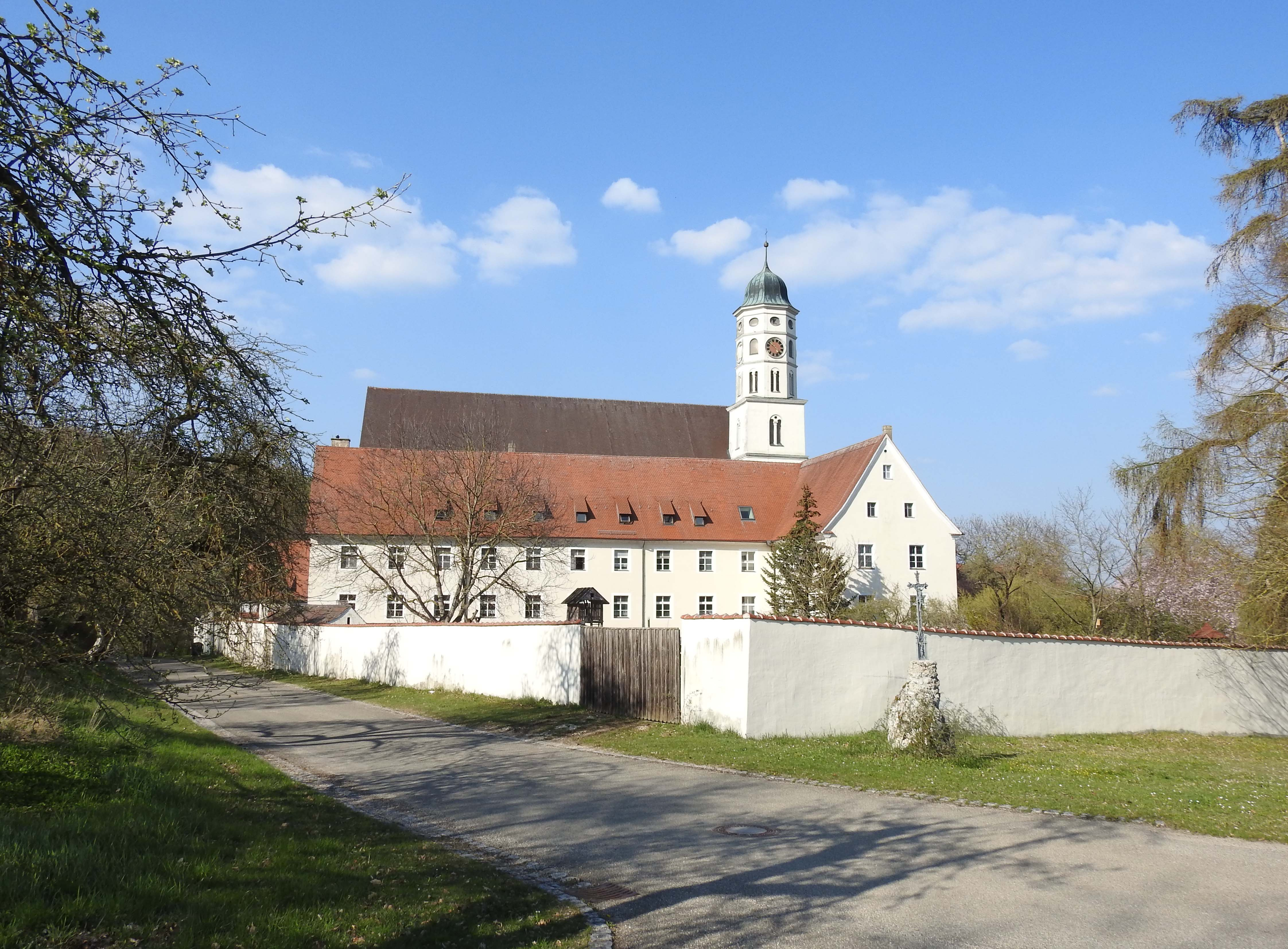
- Maihingen Abbey

- Coat of arms

- Location of Maihingen within Donau-Ries district
- Interactive map of Maihingen
- Location within Germany Location within Bavaria
- Coordinates: 48°56′N 10°30′E
- Country: Germany
- State: Bavaria
- Admin. region: Schwaben
- District: Donau-Ries
- Municipal assoc.: Wallerstein

Government
  - Mayor (2020–26): Franz Stimpfle

Area
  - Total: 14.18 km^{2} (5.47 sq mi)
- Elevation: 425 m (1,394 ft)

Population (2025-12-31)
  - Total: 1,302
  - Density: 91.82/km^{2} (237.8/sq mi)
- Time zone: UTC+01:00 (CET)
  - Summer (DST): UTC+02:00 (CEST)
- Postal codes: 86747
- Dialling codes: 09087
- Vehicle registration: DON
- Website: www.maihingen.de

Maihingen (German pronunciation: [ˈmaɪɪŋən]) is a municipality in the district of Donau-Ries in Bavaria in Germany.
