= Donau-Ries =

Coordinates: 48°50′N 10°40′E

- District
- Flag Coat of arms
- Country: Germany
- State: Bavaria
- Adm. region: Swabia
- Capital: Donauwörth

Government
  - District admin.: Stefan Rößle (CSU)

Area
  - Total: 1,275 km^{2} (492 sq mi)

Population (31 December 2025)
  - Total: 135,262
  - Density: 106.1/km^{2} (274.8/sq mi)
- Time zone: UTC+01:00 (CET)
  - Summer (DST): UTC+02:00 (CEST)
- Vehicle registration: DON, NÖ
- Website: www.donau-ries.de

Donau-Ries (Danube-Ries) is a Landkreis (district) in Swabia, Bavaria, Germany. It is bounded by (from the north and clockwise) the districts of Ansbach, Weißenburg-Gunzenhausen, Eichstätt, Neuburg-Schrobenhausen, Aichach-Friedberg, Augsburg and Dillingen, and by the state of Baden-Württemberg (districts of Heidenheim and Ostalbkreis).

== History ==
From Palaeolithic times on the Nördlinger Ries was a very attractive site for human settlement. The valley of the Danube was abounding with game, and many caves in the slopes of the crater provided shelter for Neanderthals and their successors.

The Ries was always densely populated. From 450 to 15 BC Celtic peoples built their settlements on the tops of the hills. Remains of Celtic circular forts and sanctuaries can be found all over the region. They were replaced about 90 AD by the Romans, who secured the region by building forts and the Limes (which was some km north of the present district).

The Romans were driven away about 250 AD by the Alamanni, which in turn were defeated by the Franks in 496. In the early years of the Holy Roman Empire new castles were erected, among them Schloss Oettingen, which was the centre of the county of Oettingen. This county was first mentioned in 1141, ruled over the villages of the Ries and managed to gain further territories around. In the 15th century the county was divided into the two states of Oettingen-Oettingen and Oettingen-Wallerstein. Later the former decided to become Protestant, while the latter remained Catholic. This was the reason for a bloody enmity resulting in decades of war. Even prior to the Thirty Years' War there were battles, mass executions and witchhunts in both parts. In the Thirty Years' War the Ries was almost completely devastated and depopulated. Two major battles of that war took place in the region: the Battle of Nördlingen (1634) and the Battle of Nördlingen (1645).

After the war, the Counts of the mini-states (in the meantime a third county called Oettingen-Spielberg had been founded) recruited settlers from Austria to repopulate the land. The hostilities between the counties were revived. There was fighting in the War of the Spanish Succession, with two major battles taking place in the Ries. All this came to an end, when the last Protestant ruler of Oettingen-Oettingen died without a successor. The remaining states of Oettingen-Wallerstein and Oettingen-Spielberg annexed his lands and turned them into a Catholic region.

In 1806 Napoleon dissolved both Oettingen states and awarded them to Bavaria. In the Congress of Vienna the affiliation of the region with Bavaria was confirmed, and the sovereignty of the Ries ended.

On January 1, 1939, as everywhere in the German Reich, the designation "Landkreis" (district) was introduced. Thus, the district offices became the rural districts of Donauwörth and Nördlingen.

The present district was established in 1972 by merging the former districts of Nördlingen and Donauwörth.

== Geography ==
In the south, the Danube crosses the district, running from west to east. It is joined by the Lech river coming from the south. North of the river there is a hill chain, the so-called Riesalb connecting the mountain chains of the Swabian Alb in the west and the Frankish Alb in the east. Further north there is the Nördlinger Ries, a huge depression, which is in fact an ancient impact crater, caused by a meteorite some 14.8 million years ago.

== Politics ==
- Donau-Ries (electoral district)

== Coat of arms ==
The coat of arms displays:

- The eagle of the Holy Roman Empire symbolising the Free Imperial Cities of Donauwörth and Nördlingen
- The yellow cross on red background was part of the arms of all Oettingen counties
- The blue and white checkered pattern of Bavaria

== Towns and municipalities ==
Clickable map of towns and municipalities in the district

Towns
1. Donauwörth
2. Harburg
3. Nördlingen
4. Rain
Märkte
1. Kaisheim
Municipalities
1. Asbach-Bäumenheim
2. Fremdingen
3. Marxheim
4. Mertingen
5. Möttingen
6. Oberndorf am Lech
7. Tapfheim

Verwaltungsgemeinschaften
1. Monheim; 1. Buchdorf; 2. Daiting; 3. Monheim^{1,2}; 4. Rögling; 5. Tagmersheim	2. Oettingen in Bayern; 1. Auhausen; 2. Ehingen am Ries; 3. Hainsfarth; 4. Megesheim; 5. Munningen; 6. Oettingen in Bayern^{1,2}	3. Rain; 1. Genderkingen; 2. Holzheim; 3. Münster; 4. Niederschönenfeld	4. Ries; 1. Alerheim; 2. Amerdingen; 3. Deiningen; 4. Ederheim; 5. Forheim; 6. Hohenaltheim; 7. Mönchsdeggingen; 8. Reimlingen; 9. Wechingen	5. Wallerstein; 1. Maihingen; 2. Marktoffingen; 3. Wallerstein^{1,3}; 6. Wemding; 1. Fünfstetten; 2. Huisheim; 3. Otting; 4. Wemding^{1,2}; 5. Wolferstadt
^{1}seat of the Verwaltungsgemeinschaft; ^{2}town; ^{3}Markt
