= Mönchsdeggingen =

- Municipality
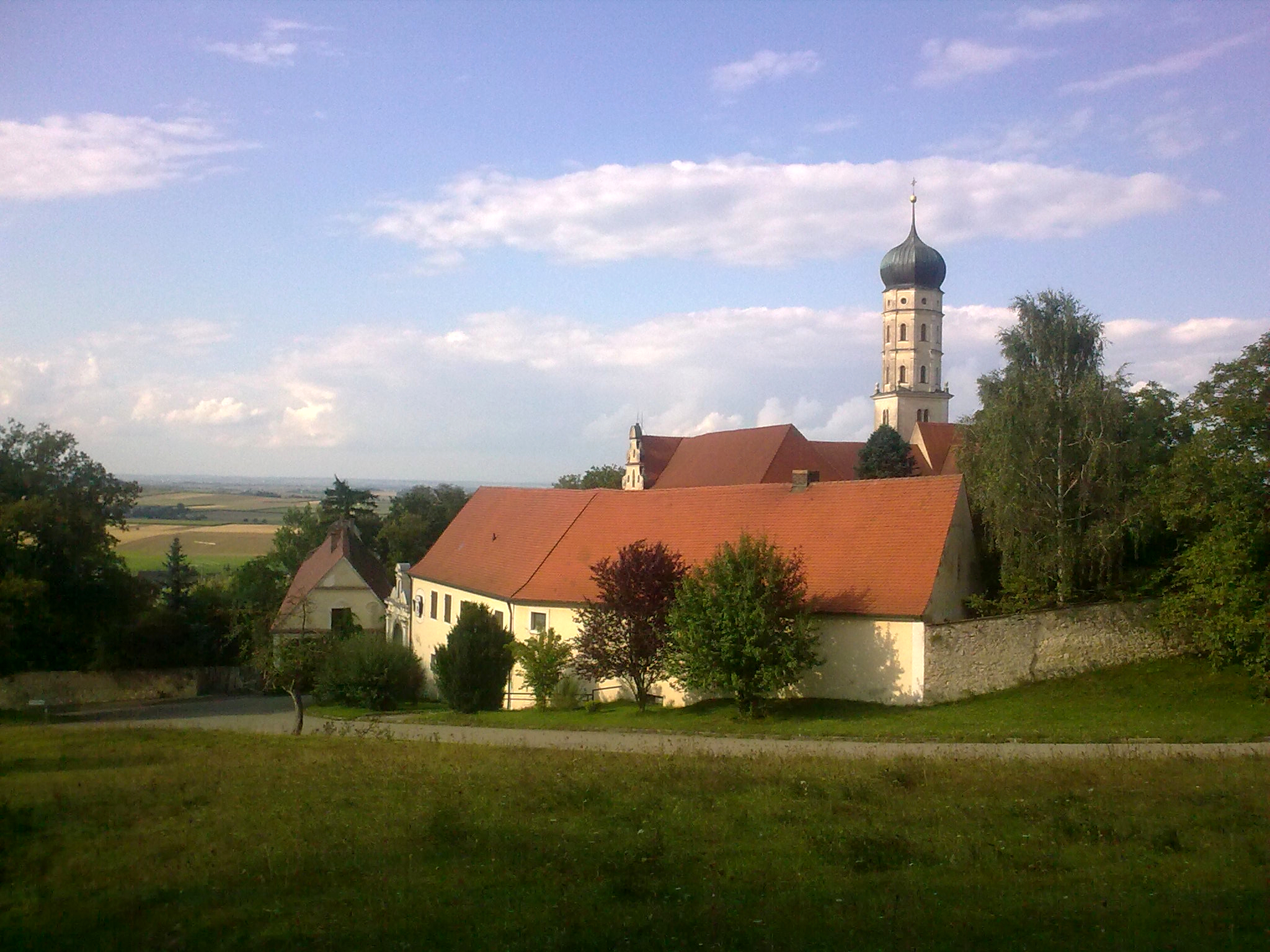
- Mönchsdeggingen Abbey

- Coat of arms

- Location of Mönchsdeggingen within Donau-Ries district
- Interactive map of Mönchsdeggingen
- Location within Germany Location within Bavaria
- Coordinates: 48°47′N 10°35′E
- Country: Germany
- State: Bavaria
- Admin. region: Schwaben
- District: Donau-Ries
- Municipal assoc.: Ries

Government
  - Mayor (2020–26): Katrin Bergdolt

Area
  - Total: 32.08 km^{2} (12.39 sq mi)
- Elevation: 435 m (1,427 ft)

Population (2025-12-31)
  - Total: 1,450
  - Density: 45.2/km^{2} (117/sq mi)
- Time zone: UTC+01:00 (CET)
  - Summer (DST): UTC+02:00 (CEST)
- Postal codes: 86751
- Dialling codes: 09088
- Vehicle registration: DON
- Website: www.moenchsdeggingen.de

Mönchsdeggingen is a municipality in the district of Donau-Ries in Bavaria in Germany.
