= Wechingen =

- Municipality
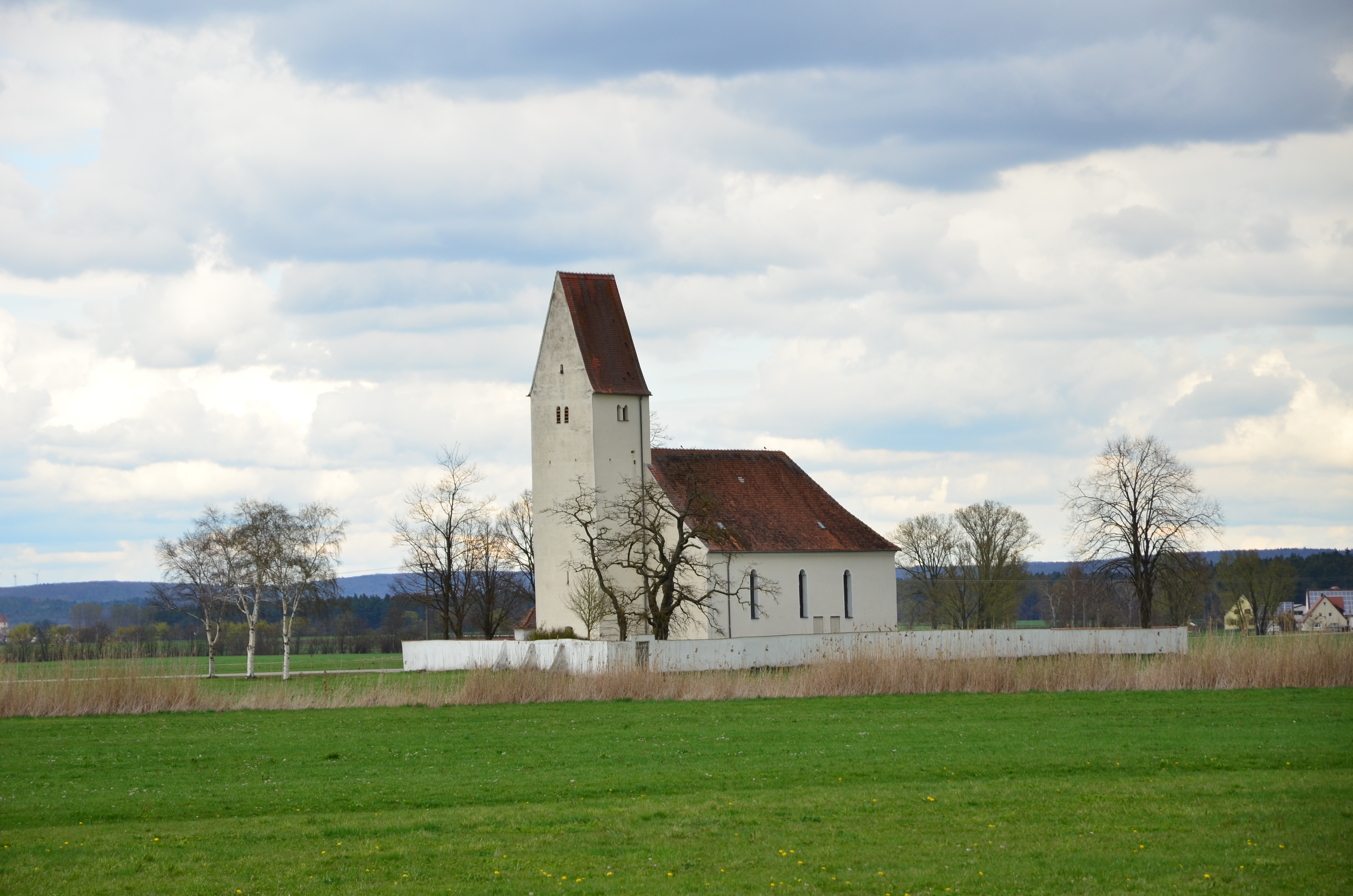
- Church of Saints Peter and Paul in Holzkirchen

- Coat of arms

- Location of Wechingen within Donau-Ries district
- Interactive map of Wechingen
- Location within Germany Location within Bavaria
- Coordinates: 48°54′N 10°37′E
- Country: Germany
- State: Bavaria
- Admin. region: Schwaben
- District: Donau-Ries
- Municipal assoc.: Ries

Government
  - Mayor (2020–26): Klaus Schmidt

Area
  - Total: 24.03 km^{2} (9.28 sq mi)
- Elevation: 413 m (1,355 ft)

Population (2025-12-31)
  - Total: 1,397
  - Density: 58.14/km^{2} (150.6/sq mi)
- Time zone: UTC+01:00 (CET)
  - Summer (DST): UTC+02:00 (CEST)
- Postal codes: 86759
- Dialling codes: 09085
- Vehicle registration: DON
- Website: www.wechingen.de

Wechingen (German pronunciation: [ˈvɛçɪŋən]) is a municipality in the district of Donau-Ries in Bavaria in Germany.

== Population development ==
- Year: Inhabitants
- 1961: 1460
- 1970: 1464
- 1987: 1317
- 1995: 1348
- 2000: 1384
- 2010: 1378
- 2015: 1428
