= Johann Wilhelm Klein =

German educationist (1765–1848)

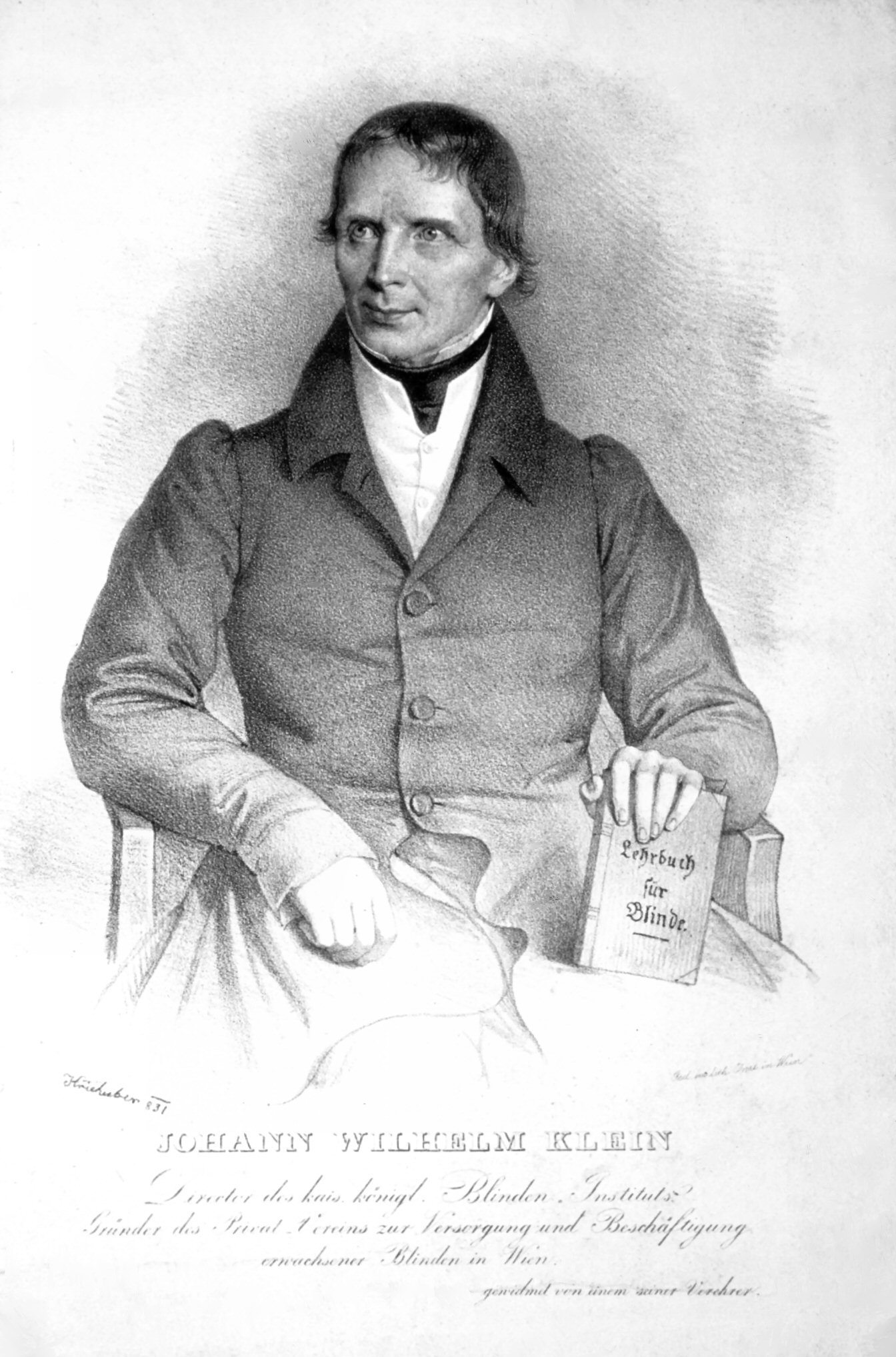
Johann Wilhelm Klein.

Johann Wilhelm Klein (11 April 1765, Alerheim at Nördlingen - 12 May 1848, Vienna) was a pioneer of education for blind people.

== Early life ==
After his early years he attended high school and then studied law at the Karlsschule in Stuttgart. After completing his studies, earning his living, first as secretary for the princely office in Upper Alerheim. The Napoleonic conquests brought great misery and destitution to the hometown of Klein. In 1799, he travelled by ship to the Vienna, where he spent the rest of his life. The progressive conditions in Austria under Emperor Joseph II may have attracted him. Little is known about the first four years in Vienna. What is known is that he lived in very poor economic conditions, as a tutor to the son of Count of Wallis. Volunteering, he was drafted as a district director for the poor, and so had to deal with many blind people, who made up a large proportion of the poor.

== Career ==
On 13 May 1804 Klein began to teach a young blind man, James Brown, at home, with government support. Thus arose the first blind institute in Germany. Klein's mission in life was now the care of the blind, the education and career guidance to make it in the world of work. in 1807 Klein presented his Stachelschrift, a printing device with which he could type the upper-case letters of the Latin script and create marks in dotted form in the paper. For the blind this writing was not easy to read and to write by hand was hard even for the sighted. Klein rejected Braille because of their dissimilarity from the script of the sighted. In 1826 he erected in Josefstadt a suburb of Vienna, a "supply and employment institution for adult blind". Amidst the turmoil of civil war in 1848, Klein died of pneumonia on 12 May, the age of 83. He was later reburied in a grave of honour at the Vienna Central Cemetery (Group 0, row 1, section 19).

== Works ==
In 1819 he wrote a Textbook for Instruction of the Blind, which was published in Vienna. This was considered as a guide for generations of blind teachers.

== Bibliography ==
- Friedrich Benesch (1977). "Klein, Johann Wilhelm". Neue Deutsche Biographie (in German). Vol. 11. Berlin: Duncker & Humblot. pp. 742–743.
- August Hirsch (1882). "Klein, Johann Wilhelm" . Allgemeine Deutsche Biographie (in German). Vol. 16. Leipzig: Duncker & Humblot. pp. 97–98.
- "Klein Johann Wilhelm". In: Österreichisches Biographisches Lexikon 1815–1950 (ÖBL). Vol. 3, Austrian Academy of Sciences, Vienna 1965, p. 382.
- Klein, Johann Wilhelm in Constant of Wurzbach, Biographical Encyclopedia of the Empire, Austria, volume 12, page 51, Vienna, Imperial Court and State Printing 1864
- Karl Heinz Scheible: Johann Wilhelm Klein . In: Wulf-Dietrich Kavasch, Günter Lemke and Albert Schlagbauer (eds): 2002, ISBN 3-923373-54-6, pp. 313–357
