= Tapfheim =

- Municipality
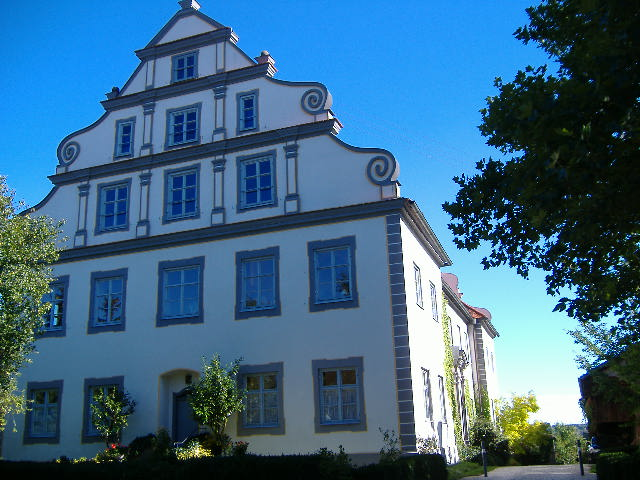
- Tapfheim Palace

- Coat of arms

- Location of Tapfheim within Donau-Ries district
- Interactive map of Tapfheim
- Location within Germany Location within Bavaria
- Coordinates: 48°40′N 10°40′E
- Country: Germany
- State: Bavaria
- Admin. region: Schwaben
- District: Donau-Ries

Government
  - Mayor (2022–28): Marcus Späth

Area
  - Total: 44.46 km^{2} (17.17 sq mi)
- Elevation: 415 m (1,362 ft)

Population (2025-12-31)
  - Total: 4,126
  - Density: 92.80/km^{2} (240.4/sq mi)
- Time zone: UTC+01:00 (CET)
  - Summer (DST): UTC+02:00 (CEST)
- Postal codes: 86660
- Dialling codes: 09070
- Vehicle registration: DON
- Website: www.tapfheim.de

Tapfheim (Swabian: Dapfa) is a municipality in the district of Donau-Ries in Bavaria in Germany. It lies on the river Danube.

== Mayors ==
- since 2004: Karl Malz (reelected in 2010 and 2016)
- 1986-2004: Alfred Stöckl
- 1972-1986: Johannes Strasser
