= Rain (Verwaltungsgemeinschaft, Swabia) =

- Verwaltungsgemeinschaft
- Location of Rain within Donau-Ries district
- Interactive map of Rain
- Location within Germany Location within Bavaria
- Coordinates: 48°41′N 10°55′E
- Country: Germany
- State: Bavaria
- Admin. region: Swabia
- District: Donau-Ries
- Seat: Rain
- Subdivisions: 4 municipalities

Area
  - Total: 64.02 km^{2} (24.72 sq mi)

Population (2025-12-31)
  - Total: 4,966
  - Density: 77.57/km^{2} (200.9/sq mi)
- Time zone: UTC+01:00 (CET)
  - Summer (DST): UTC+02:00 (CEST)
- Website: vg-rain.de

Rain is a Verwaltungsgemeinschaft (municipal association) in the district Donau-Ries in Bavaria, Germany. Its seat is in Rain, itself not part of the Verwaltungsgemeinschaft.

It consists of the following municipalities:

1. Genderkingen
2. Holzheim
3. Münster
4. Niederschönenfeld
