= Forheim =

- Municipality
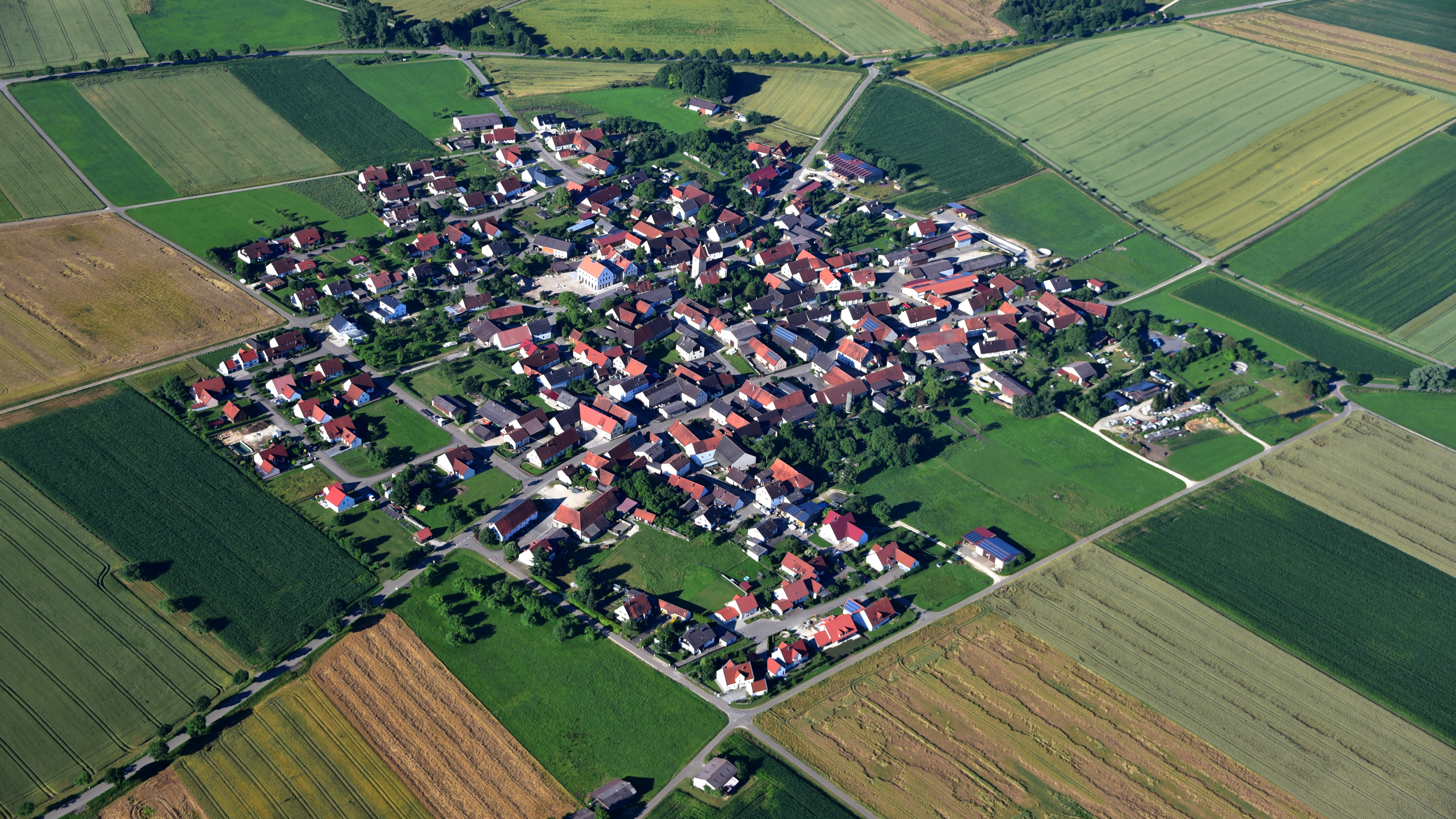
- Aerial view

- Coat of arms

- Location of Forheim within Donau-Ries district
- Interactive map of Forheim
- Location within Germany Location within Bavaria
- Coordinates: 48°46′N 10°27′E
- Country: Germany
- State: Bavaria
- Admin. region: Schwaben
- District: Donau-Ries
- Municipal assoc.: Ries

Government
  - Mayor (2020–26): Andreas Bruckmeier

Area
  - Total: 23.26 km^{2} (8.98 sq mi)
- Elevation: 574 m (1,883 ft)

Population (2025-12-31)
  - Total: 529
  - Density: 22.7/km^{2} (58.9/sq mi)
- Time zone: UTC+01:00 (CET)
  - Summer (DST): UTC+02:00 (CEST)
- Postal codes: 86735
- Dialling codes: 09089
- Vehicle registration: DON
- Website: www.forheim.de

Forheim is a municipality in the district of Donau-Ries in Bavaria in Germany.
