= Tagmersheim =

- Municipality
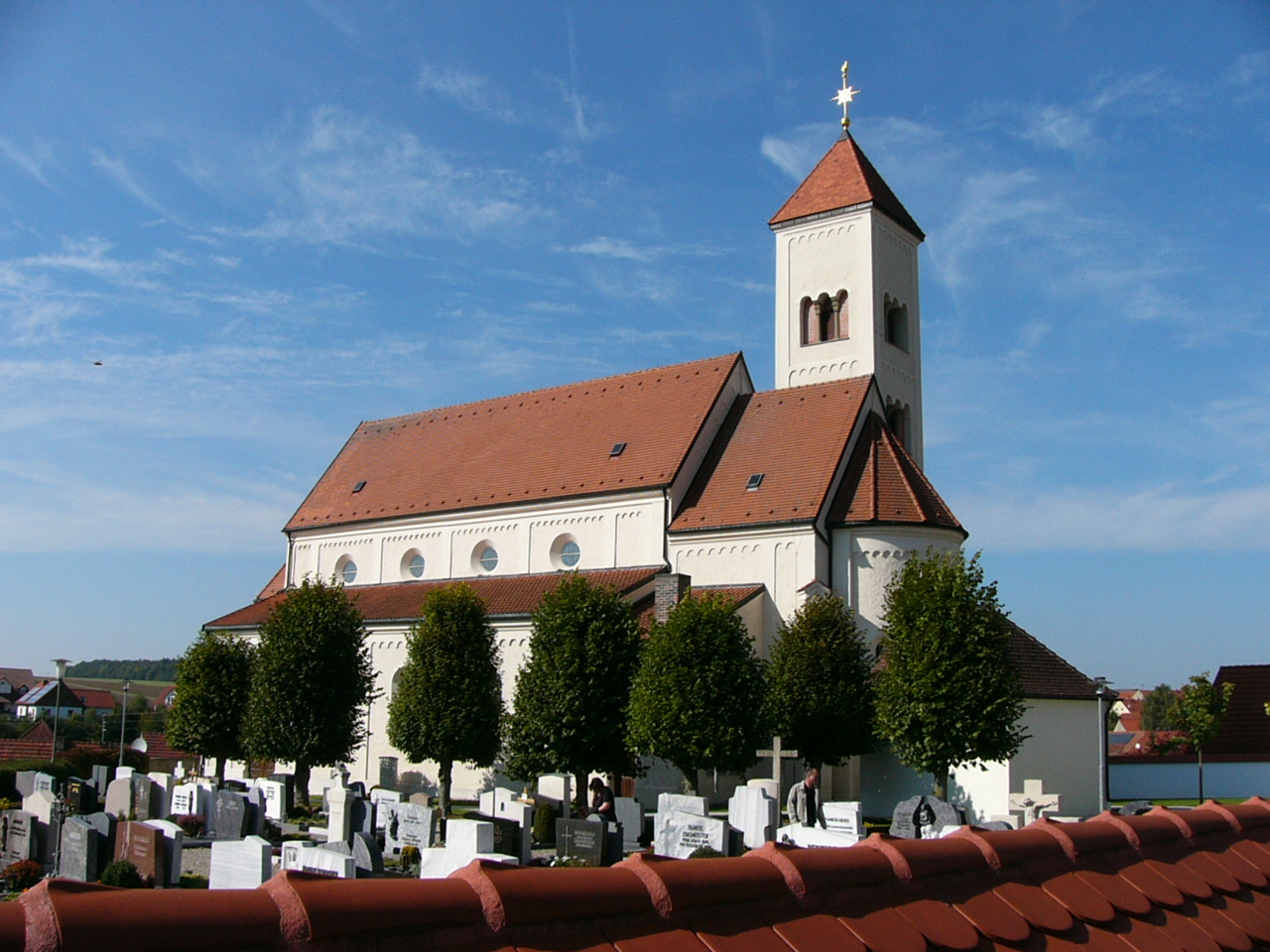
- Church of Saint James

- Coat of arms

- Location of Tagmersheim within Donau-Ries district
- Interactive map of Tagmersheim
- Location within Germany Location within Bavaria
- Coordinates: 48°49′N 10°58′E
- Country: Germany
- State: Bavaria
- Admin. region: Schwaben
- District: Donau-Ries
- Municipal assoc.: Monheim

Government
  - Mayor (2020–26): Petra Riedelsheimer (CSU)

Area
  - Total: 15.95 km^{2} (6.16 sq mi)
- Elevation: 500 m (1,600 ft)

Population (2025-12-31)
  - Total: 1,047
  - Density: 65.64/km^{2} (170.0/sq mi)
- Time zone: UTC+01:00 (CET)
  - Summer (DST): UTC+02:00 (CEST)
- Postal codes: 86704
- Dialling codes: 09094
- Vehicle registration: DON
- Website: www.tagmersheim.de

Tagmersheim is a municipality in the district of Donau-Ries in Bavaria in Germany.
