= Genderkingen =

- Municipality
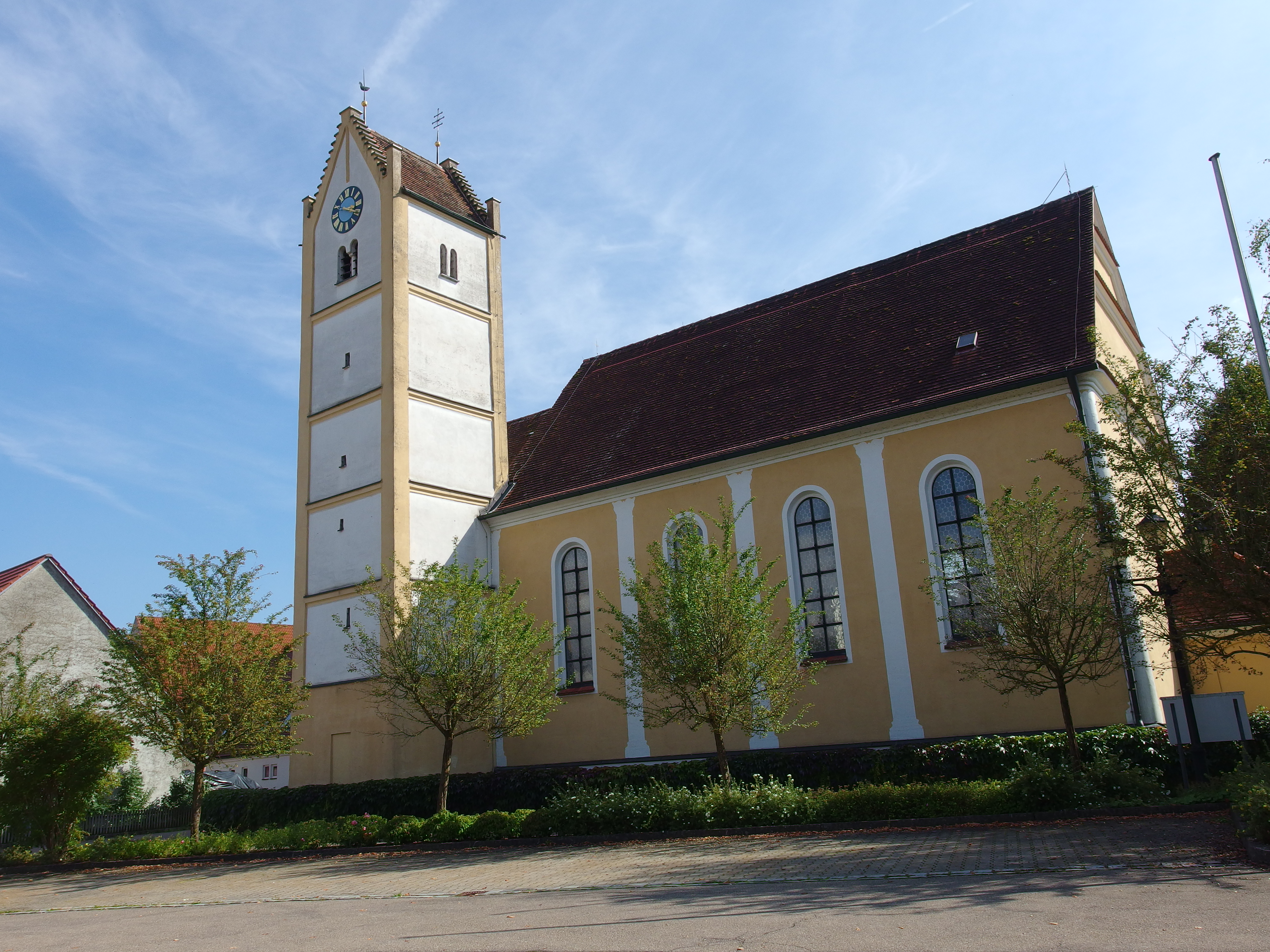
- Church of Saints Peter and Paul

- Coat of arms

- Location of Genderkingen within Donau-Ries district
- Interactive map of Genderkingen
- Location within Germany Location within Bavaria
- Coordinates: 48°42′N 10°53′E
- Country: Germany
- State: Bavaria
- Admin. region: Schwaben
- District: Donau-Ries
- Municipal assoc.: Rain

Government
  - Mayor (2020–26): Leonhard Schwab

Area
  - Total: 11.67 km^{2} (4.51 sq mi)
- Elevation: 399 m (1,309 ft)

Population (2025-12-31)
  - Total: 1,176
  - Density: 100.8/km^{2} (261.0/sq mi)
- Time zone: UTC+01:00 (CET)
  - Summer (DST): UTC+02:00 (CEST)
- Postal codes: 86682
- Dialling codes: 09090
- Vehicle registration: DON
- Website: www.genderkingen.de

Genderkingen (German pronunciation: [ˈɡɛndɐkɪŋən]; Swabian: Genderkinga) is a municipality in the district of Donau-Ries in Bavaria in Germany. Close to the village the river Lech flows into Danube.
