= Ries (Verwaltungsgemeinschaft) =

- Verwaltungsgemeinschaft
- Location of Ries within Donau-Ries district
- Interactive map of Ries
- Location within Germany Location within Bavaria
- Coordinates: 48°51′N 10°29′E
- Country: Germany
- State: Bavaria
- Admin. region: Swabia
- District: Donau-Ries
- Seat: Nördlingen
- Subdivisions: 9 municipalities

Area
  - Total: 181.03 km^{2} (69.90 sq mi)

Population (2025-12-31)
  - Total: 10,755
  - Density: 59.410/km^{2} (153.87/sq mi)
- Time zone: UTC+01:00 (CET)
  - Summer (DST): UTC+02:00 (CEST)
- Website: www.vgries.de

Ries is a Verwaltungsgemeinschaft (municipal association) in the district Donau-Ries in Bavaria, Germany. Its seat is in Nördlingen, itself not part of the Verwaltungsgemeinschaft. It takes its name from the Nördlinger Ries.

It consists of the following municipalities:

1. Alerheim
2. Amerdingen
3. Deiningen
4. Ederheim
5. Forheim
6. Hohenaltheim
7. Mönchsdeggingen
8. Reimlingen
9. Wechingen
