= Monheim (Verwaltungsgemeinschaft) =

- Verwaltungsgemeinschaft
- Location of Monheim within Donau-Ries district
- Interactive map of Monheim
- Location within Germany Location within Bavaria
- Coordinates: 48°50′N 10°50′E
- Country: Germany
- State: Bavaria
- Admin. region: Swabia
- District: Donau-Ries
- Seat: Monheim
- Subdivisions: 5 municipalities

Area
  - Total: 138.13 km^{2} (53.33 sq mi)

Population (2025-12-31)
  - Total: 9,925
  - Density: 71.85/km^{2} (186.1/sq mi)
- Time zone: UTC+01:00 (CET)
  - Summer (DST): UTC+02:00 (CEST)
- Website: www.vg-monheim.de

Monheim is a Verwaltungsgemeinschaft (municipal association) in the district Donau-Ries in Bavaria, Germany. Its seat is in Monheim.

It consists of the following municipalities:

1. Buchdorf
2. Daiting
3. Monheim
4. Rögling
5. Tagmersheim
