= Wallerstein (Verwaltungsgemeinschaft) =

- Verwaltungsgemeinschaft
- Location of Wallerstein within Donau-Ries district
- Interactive map of Wallerstein
- Location within Germany Location within Bavaria
- Coordinates: 48°53′N 10°28′E
- Country: Germany
- State: Bavaria
- Admin. region: Swabia
- District: Donau-Ries
- Seat: Wallerstein
- Subdivisions: 3 municipalities

Area
  - Total: 47.21 km^{2} (18.23 sq mi)

Population (2025-12-31)
  - Total: 5,982
  - Density: 126.7/km^{2} (328.2/sq mi)
- Time zone: UTC+01:00 (CET)
  - Summer (DST): UTC+02:00 (CEST)
- Website: vg-wallerstein.de

Wallerstein is a Verwaltungsgemeinschaft (municipal association) in the district Donau-Ries in Bavaria, Germany. Its seat is in Wallerstein.

It consists of the following municipalities:

1. Maihingen
2. Marktoffingen
3. Wallerstein
