= Hohenaltheim =

- Municipality
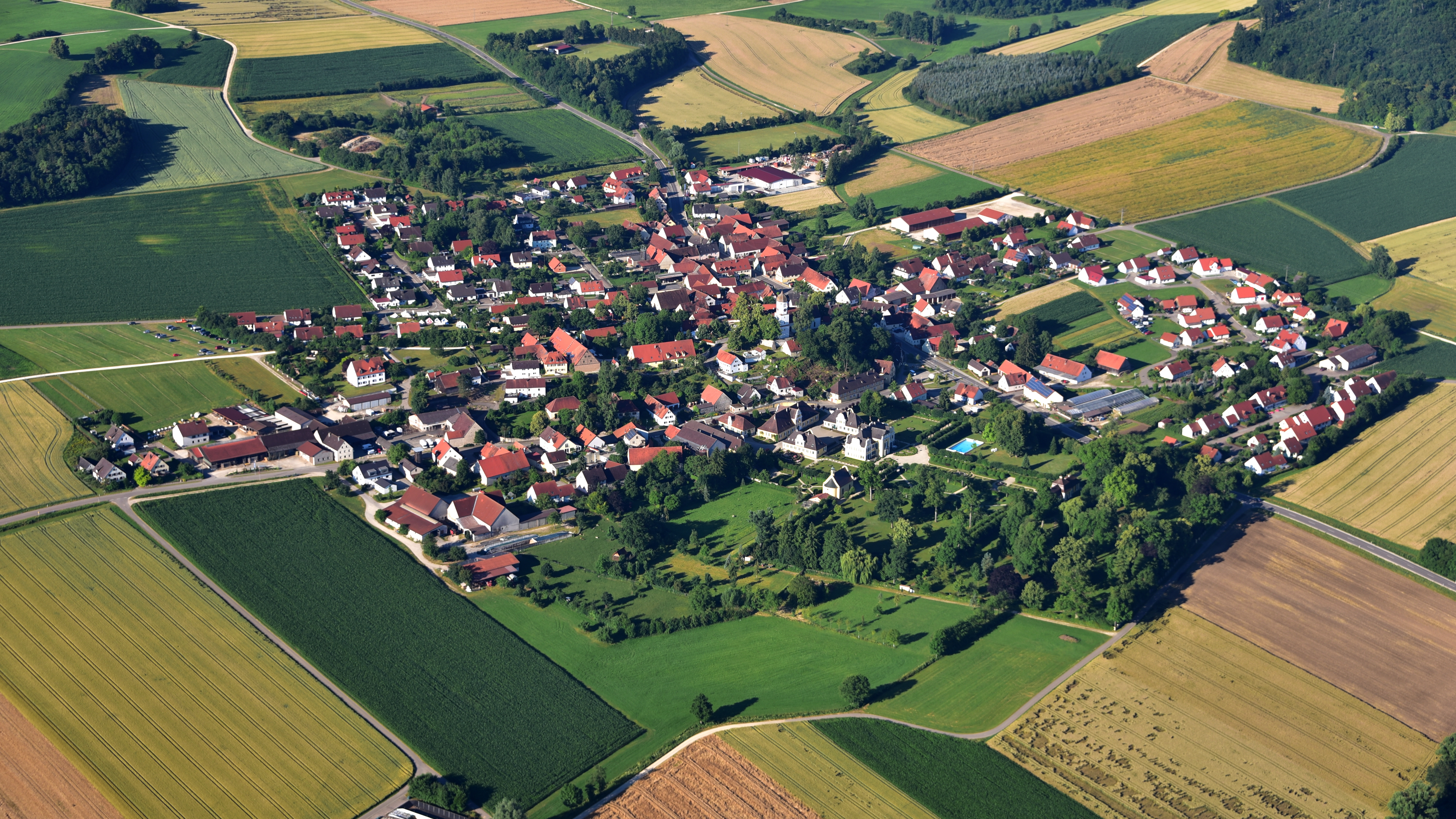
- Aerial view

- Coat of arms

- Location of Hohenaltheim within Donau-Ries district
- Interactive map of Hohenaltheim
- Location within Germany Location within Bavaria
- Coordinates: 48°47′N 10°32′E
- Country: Germany
- State: Bavaria
- Admin. region: Schwaben
- District: Donau-Ries
- Municipal assoc.: Ries

Government
  - Mayor (2023–29): Armin Sporys

Area
  - Total: 17.82 km^{2} (6.88 sq mi)
- Elevation: 454 m (1,490 ft)

Population (2025-12-31)
  - Total: 540
  - Density: 30/km^{2} (78/sq mi)
- Time zone: UTC+01:00 (CET)
  - Summer (DST): UTC+02:00 (CEST)
- Postal codes: 86745
- Dialling codes: 09088
- Vehicle registration: DON
- Website: www.hohenaltheim.de

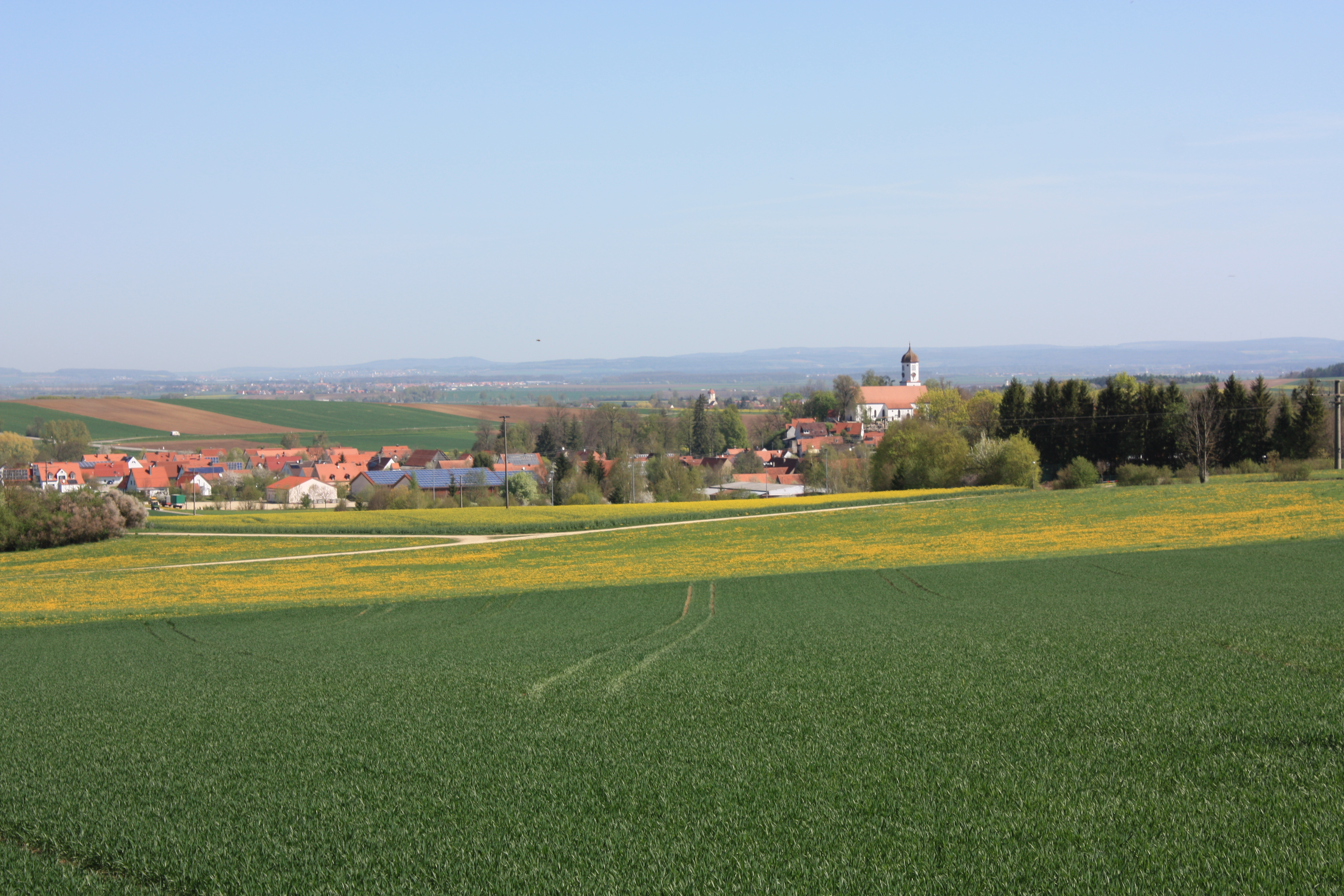
Hohenaltheim

Hohenaltheim is a municipality in the district of Donau-Ries in Bavaria in Germany.
