= Marktoffingen =

- Municipality
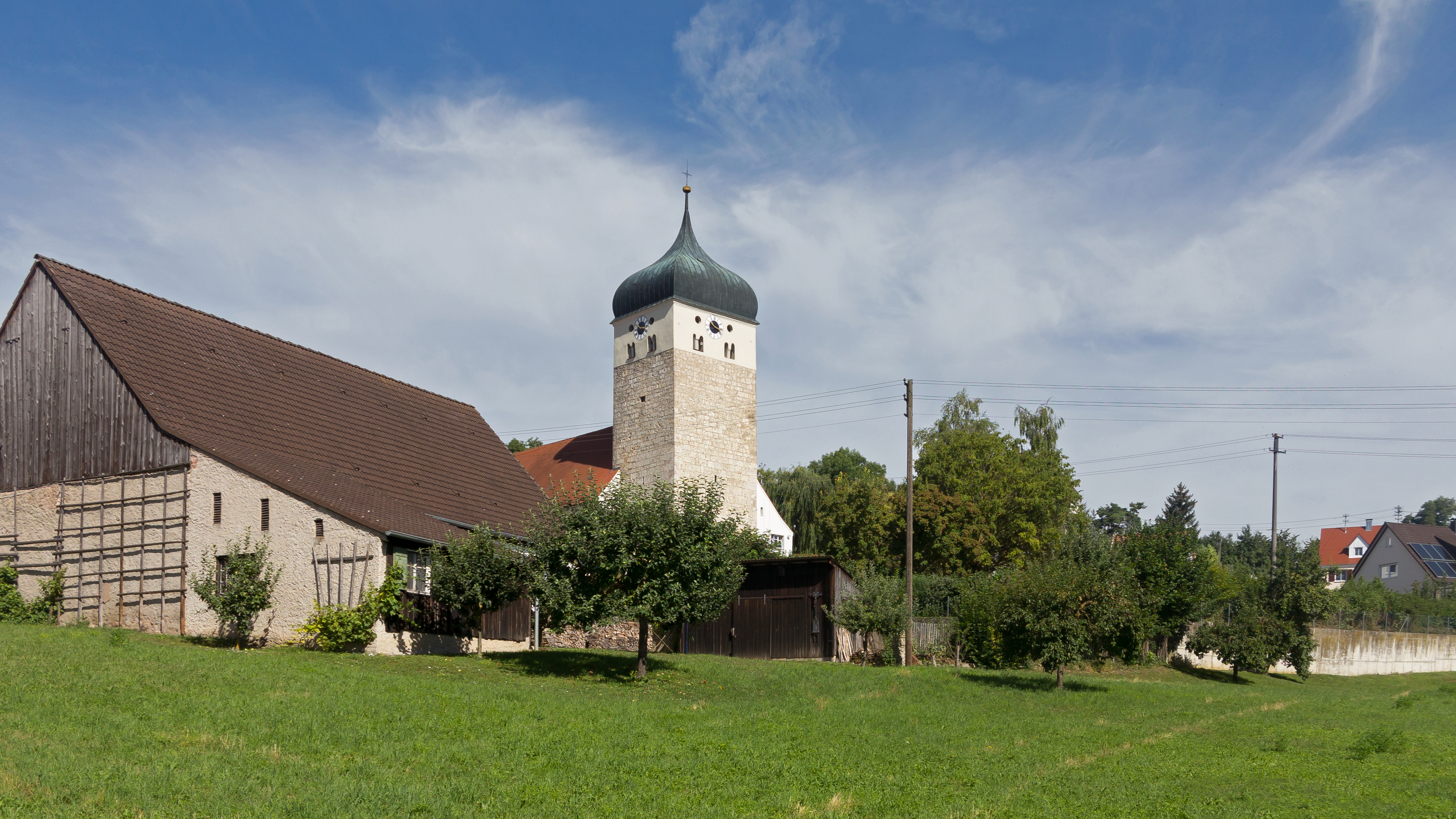
- Church of the Assumption of the Virgin Mary

- Coat of arms

- Location of Marktoffingen within Donau-Ries district
- Interactive map of Marktoffingen
- Location within Germany Location within Bavaria
- Coordinates: 48°56′N 10°29′E
- Country: Germany
- State: Bavaria
- Admin. region: Schwaben
- District: Donau-Ries
- Municipal assoc.: Wallerstein

Government
  - Mayor (2020–26): Helmut Bauer

Area
  - Total: 13.60 km^{2} (5.25 sq mi)
- Elevation: 464 m (1,522 ft)

Population (2025-12-31)
  - Total: 1,281
  - Density: 94.19/km^{2} (244.0/sq mi)
- Time zone: UTC+01:00 (CET)
  - Summer (DST): UTC+02:00 (CEST)
- Postal codes: 86748
- Dialling codes: 09087
- Vehicle registration: DON
- Website: marktoffingen.de

Marktoffingen is a municipality in the district of Donau-Ries in Bavaria in Germany.

== Gallery ==
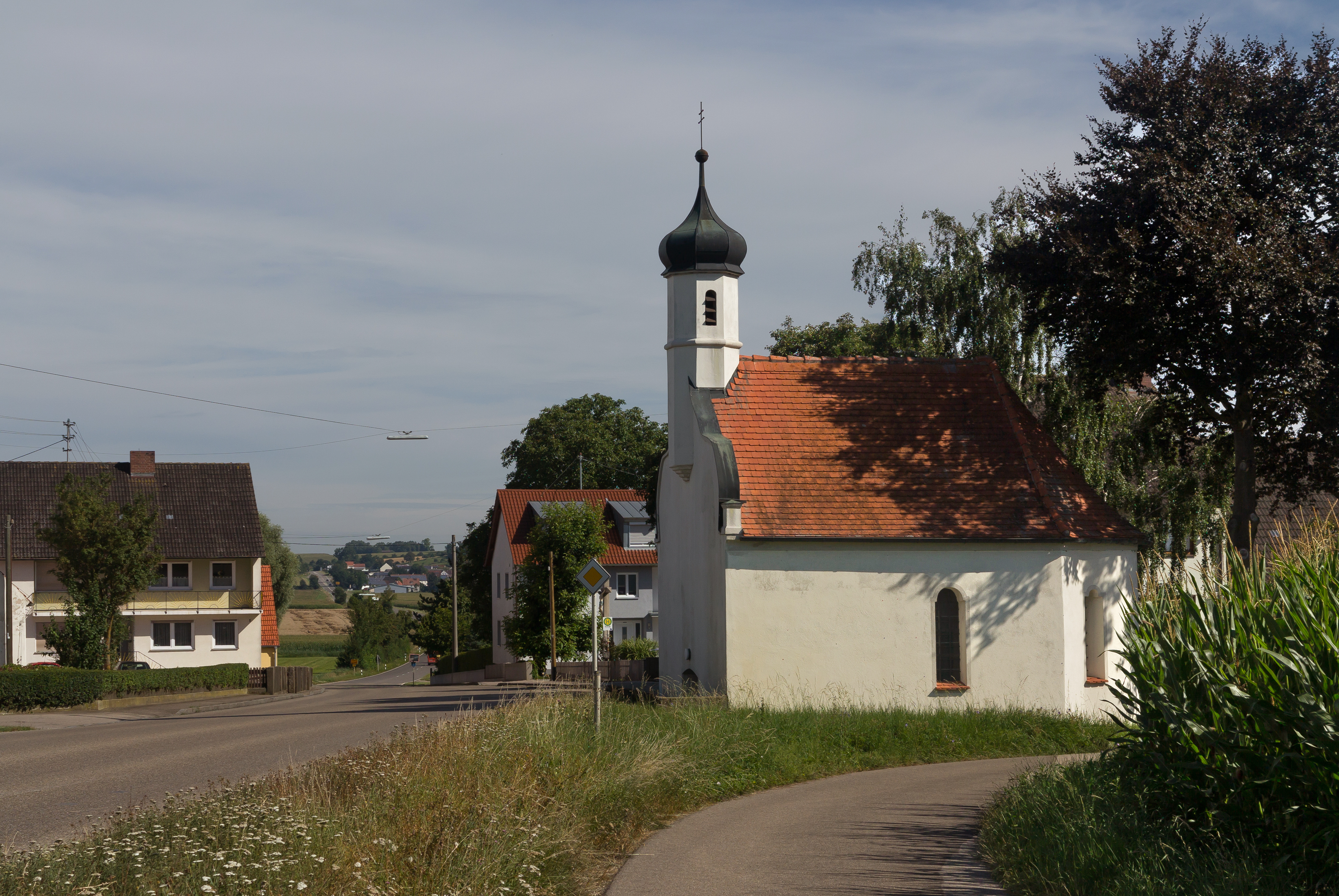
Chapel of Virgin Mary in Wengenhausen

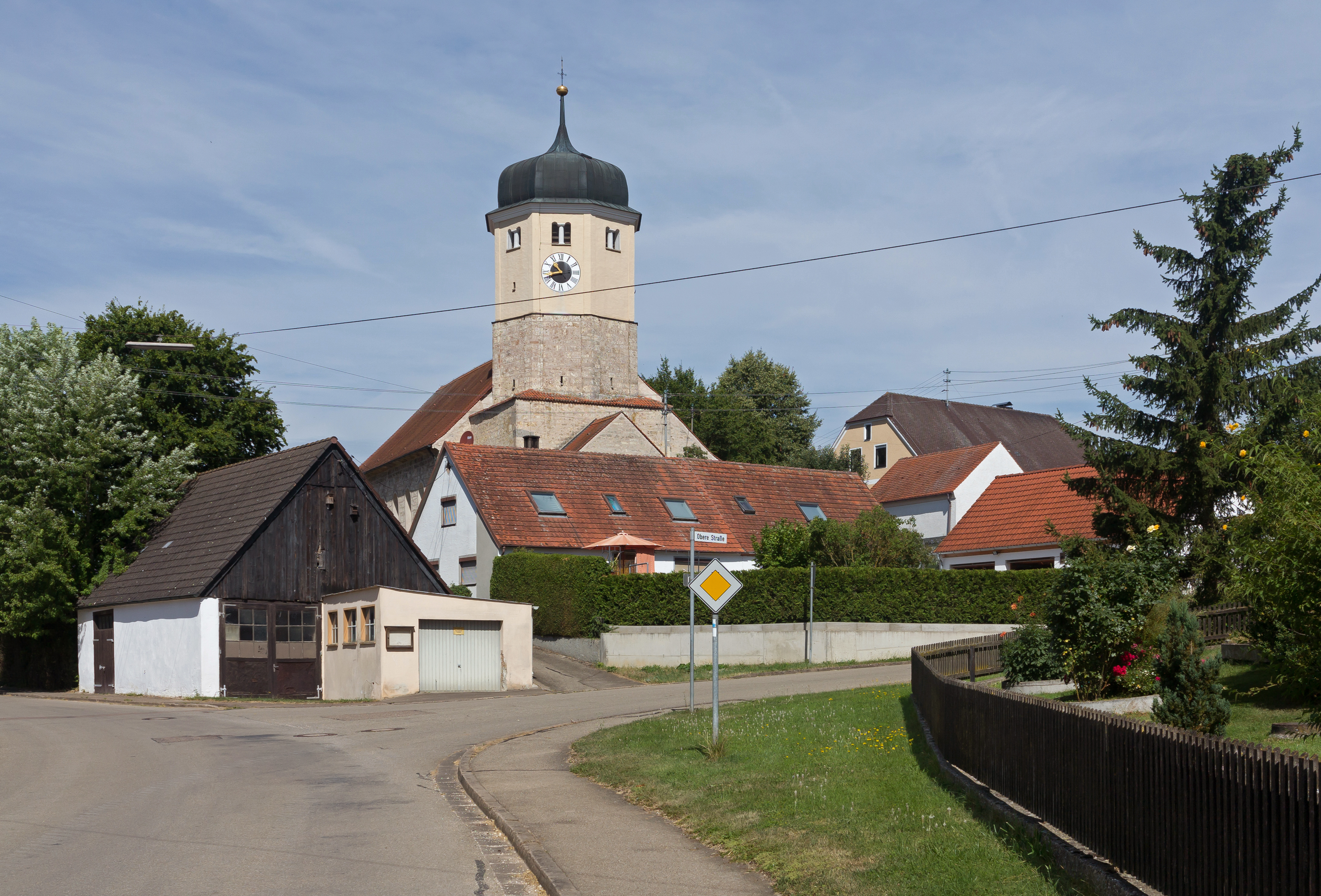
Church of Saint Lawrence in Minderoffingen
