= Alerheim =

- Municipality
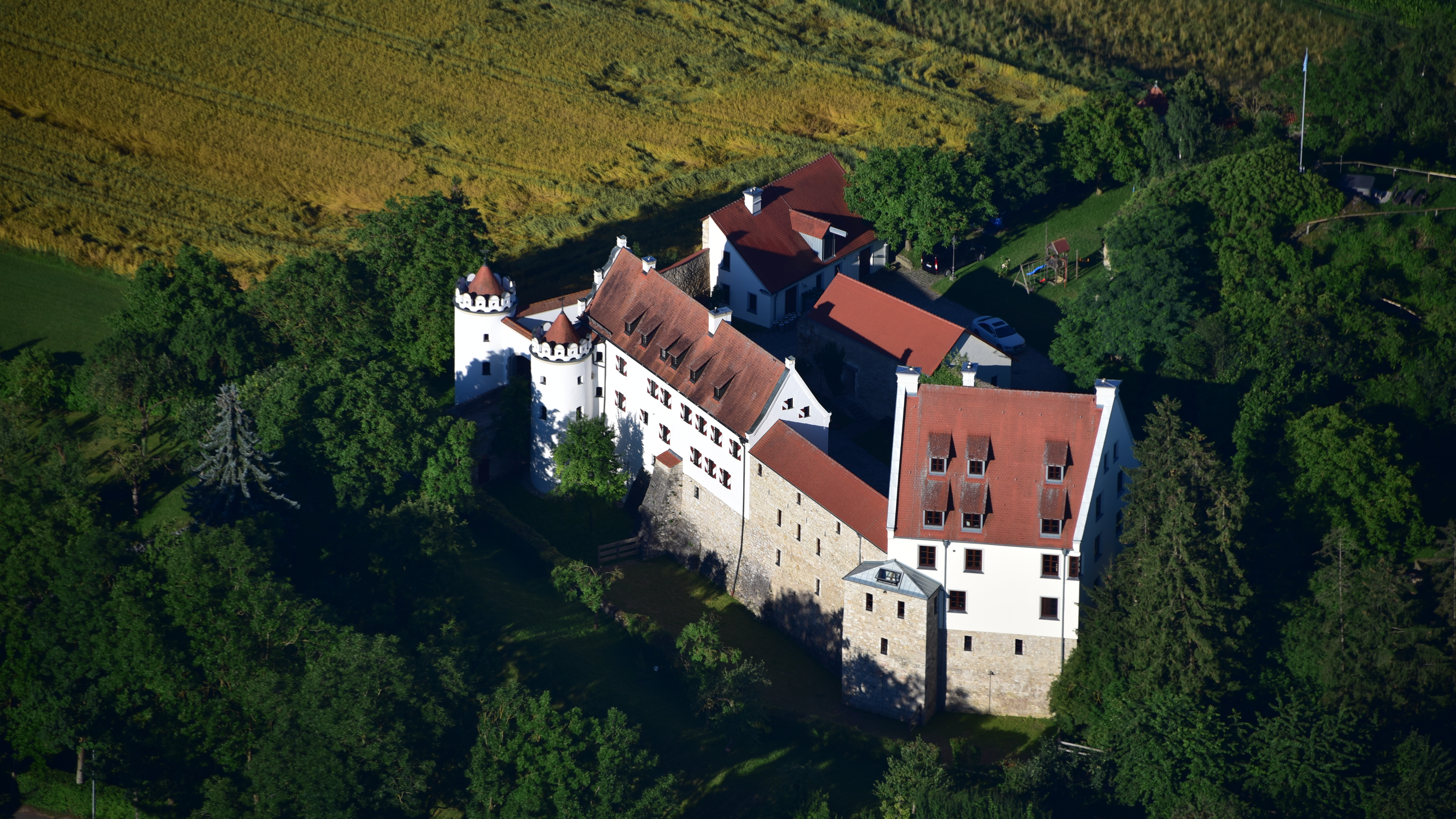
- Alerheim Castle

- Coat of arms

- Location of Alerheim within Donau-Ries district
- Interactive map of Alerheim
- Location within Germany Location within Bavaria
- Coordinates: 48°51′N 10°37′E
- Country: Germany
- State: Bavaria
- Admin. region: Schwaben
- District: Donau-Ries
- Municipal assoc.: Ries

Government
  - Mayor (2022–28): Alexander Joas

Area
  - Total: 23.37 km^{2} (9.02 sq mi)
- Elevation: 425 m (1,394 ft)

Population (2025-12-31)
  - Total: 1,676
  - Density: 71.72/km^{2} (185.7/sq mi)
- Time zone: UTC+01:00 (CET)
  - Summer (DST): UTC+02:00 (CEST)
- Postal codes: 86733
- Dialling codes: 09085
- Vehicle registration: DON
- Website: www.alerheim.de

Alerheim (German pronunciation: [ˈaːlɐhaɪm]) is a municipality in the district of Donau-Ries in Bavaria in Germany.

== Mayor ==
In January 2022 Alexander Joas was elected mayor. He succeeded Christoph Schmid, who had been in office since 2008.

=== Sons and daughters of the community ===
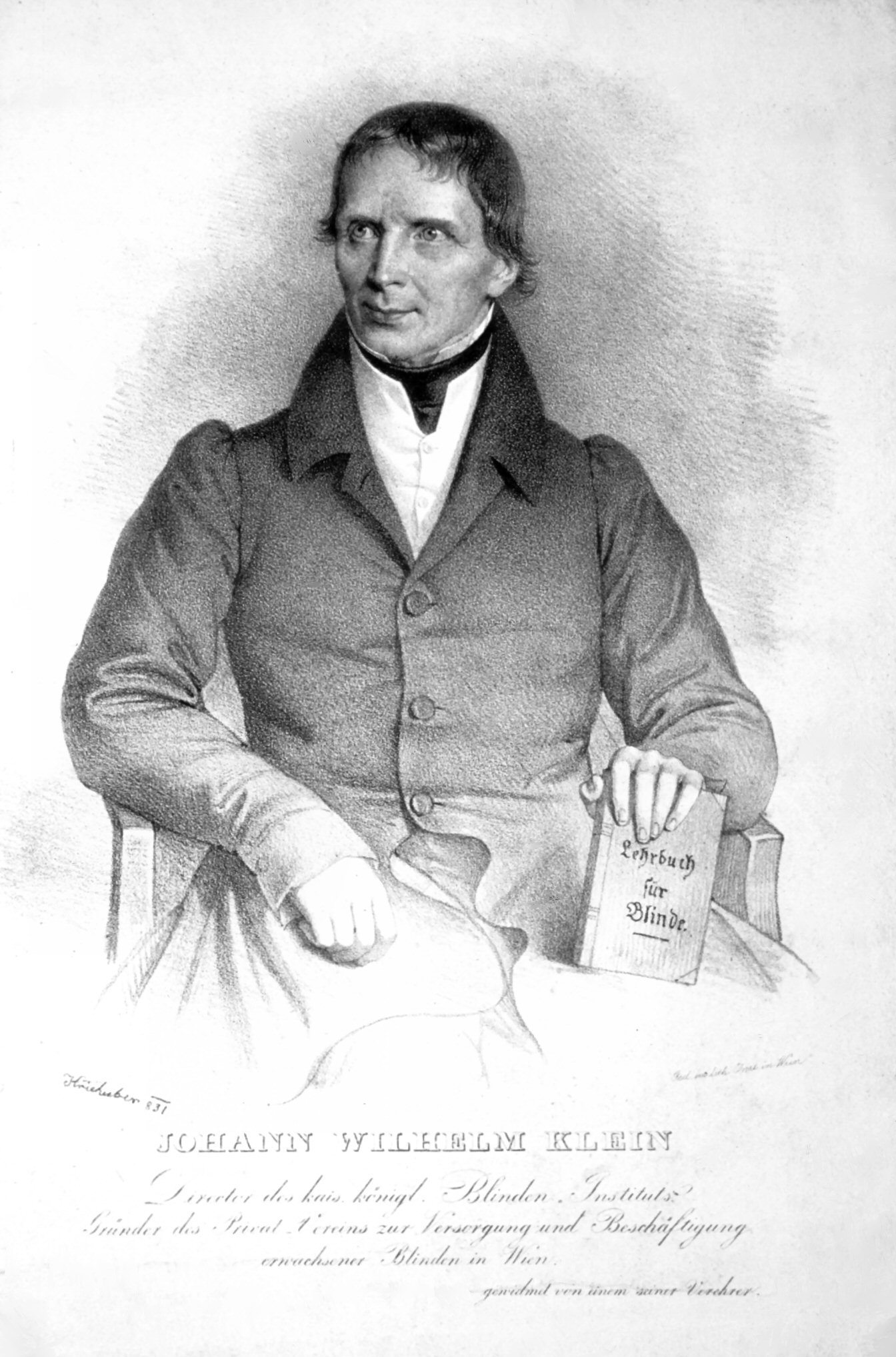
Johann Wilhelm Klein 1831

- Johann Wilhelm Klein (1765-1848), pioneer of education for blind people
- Wilhelm Schmidt (1888-1962), politician, (Economic Reconstruction Union), German Party (1947))
