= Ederheim =

- Municipality
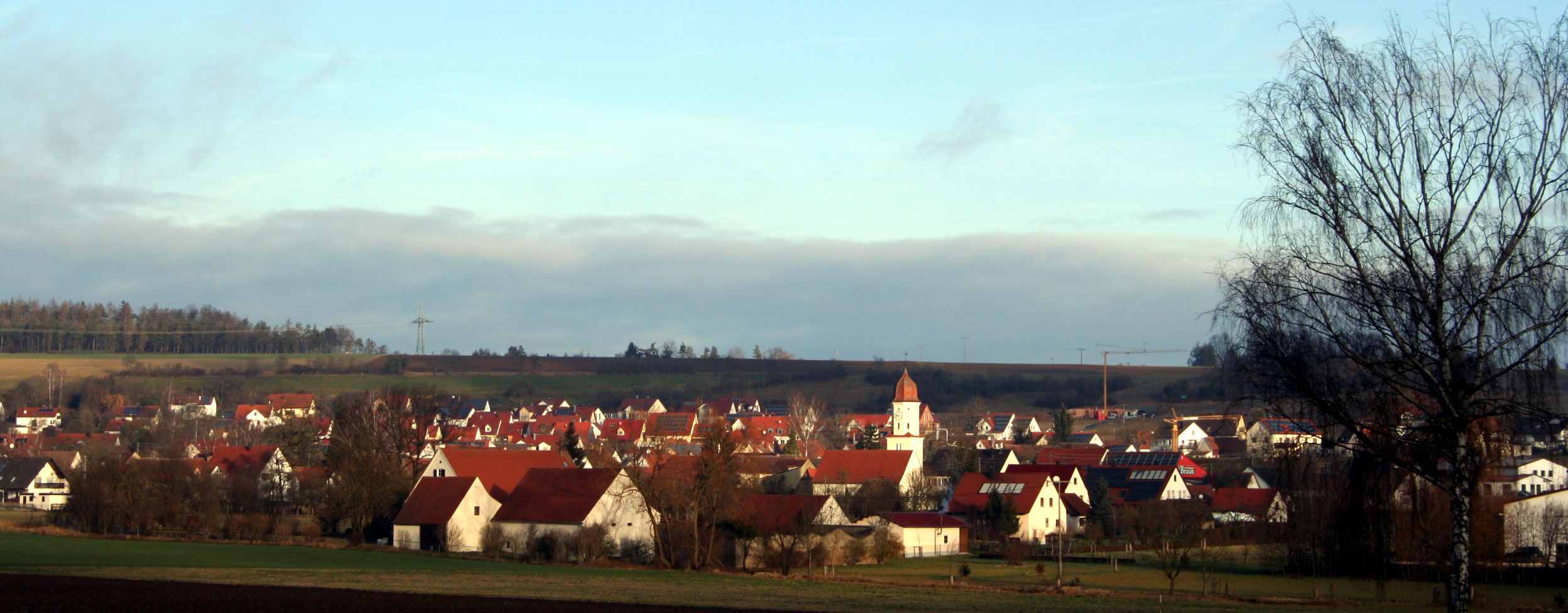
- General view of Ederheim

- Coat of arms

- Location of Ederheim within Donau-Ries district
- Interactive map of Ederheim
- Location within Germany Location within Bavaria
- Coordinates: 48°49′N 10°28′E
- Country: Germany
- State: Bavaria
- Admin. region: Schwaben
- District: Donau-Ries
- Municipal assoc.: Ries

Government
  - Mayor (2020–26): Petra Eisele

Area
  - Total: 16.57 km^{2} (6.40 sq mi)
- Elevation: 469 m (1,539 ft)

Population (2025-12-31)
  - Total: 1,100
  - Density: 66/km^{2} (170/sq mi)
- Time zone: UTC+01:00 (CET)
  - Summer (DST): UTC+02:00 (CEST)
- Postal codes: 86739
- Dialling codes: 09081
- Vehicle registration: DON
- Website: www.ederheim.de

Ederheim is a municipality in the district of Donau-Ries in Bavaria in Germany.
