= Deiningen =

- Municipality
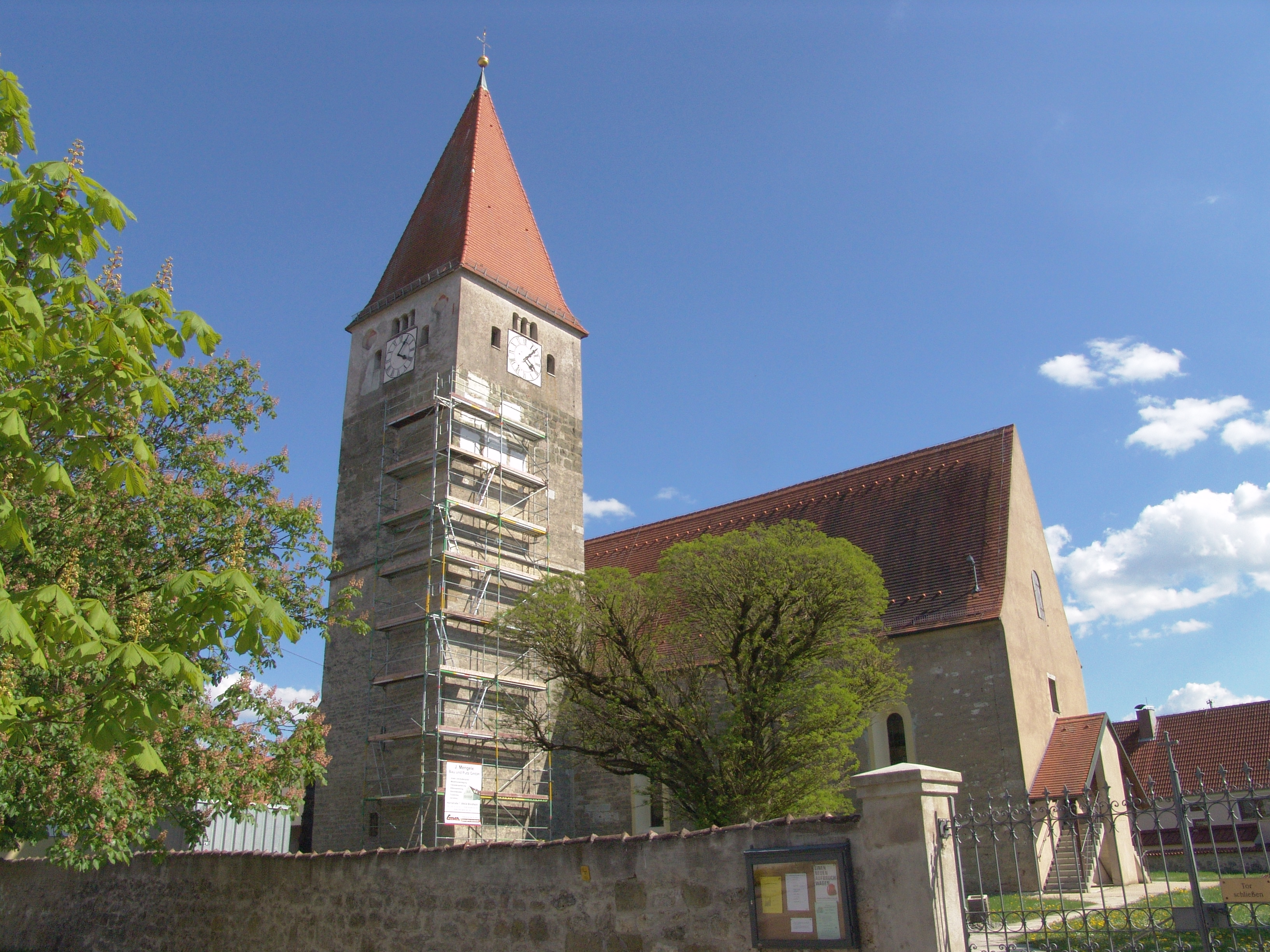
- Church of Saint Martin

- Coat of arms

- Location of Deiningen within Donau-Ries district
- Interactive map of Deiningen
- Location within Germany Location within Bavaria
- Coordinates: 48°52′N 10°34′E
- Country: Germany
- State: Bavaria
- Admin. region: Schwaben
- District: Donau-Ries
- Municipal assoc.: Ries

Government
  - Mayor (2020–26): Wilhelm Rehklau (CSU)

Area
  - Total: 15.33 km^{2} (5.92 sq mi)
- Elevation: 420 m (1,380 ft)

Population (2025-12-31)
  - Total: 1,843
  - Density: 120.2/km^{2} (311.4/sq mi)
- Time zone: UTC+01:00 (CET)
  - Summer (DST): UTC+02:00 (CEST)
- Postal codes: 86738
- Dialling codes: 09081
- Vehicle registration: DON
- Website: www.deiningen.de

Deiningen (German pronunciation: [ˈdaɪnɪŋən]) is a municipality in the district of Donau-Ries in Swabia, Bavaria in Germany.
