= Buchdahl =

Buchdahl is a surname. Notable persons with this name include:

- Angela Warnick Buchdahl (born 1972), American rabbi
- Gerd Buchdahl (1914–2001), German-born English philosopher of science
- Hans Adolf Buchdahl (1919–2010), German-born Australian physicist, brother of Gerd
- Kate Buchdahl (1964–1992), Australian violinist, daughter of Hans
