= Holzheim, Donau-Ries =

Holzheim
- Municipality
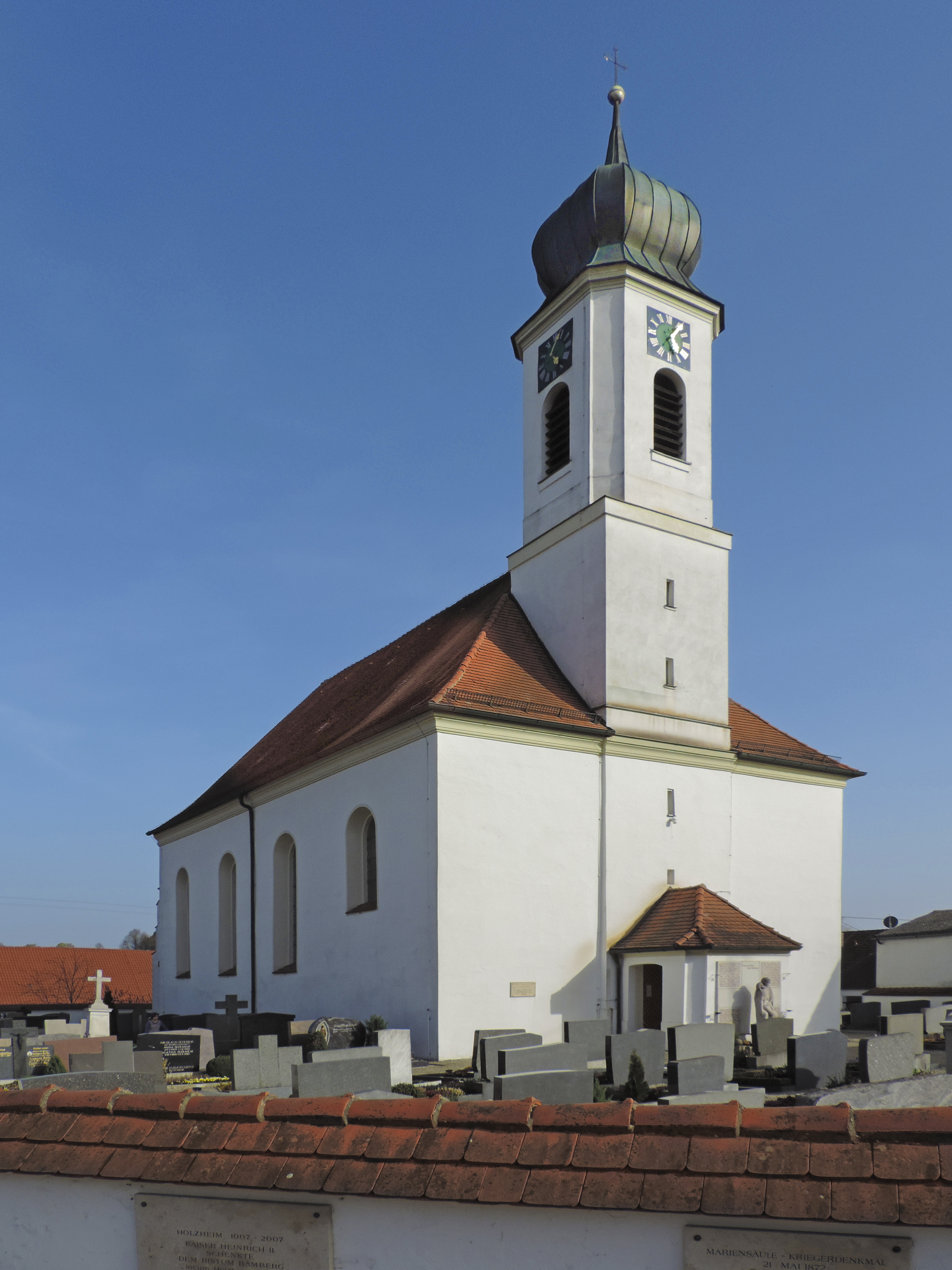
- Church of the Assumption of the Virgin Mary

- Coat of arms

- Location of Holzheim within Donau-Ries district
- Interactive map of Holzheim
- Location within Germany Location within Bavaria
- Coordinates: 48°37′N 10°58′E
- Country: Germany
- State: Bavaria
- Admin. region: Schwaben
- District: Donau-Ries
- Municipal assoc.: Rain

Government
  - Mayor (2020–26): Josef Schmidberger (CSU)

Area
  - Total: 20.29 km^{2} (7.83 sq mi)
- Elevation: 414–475 m (1,358–1,558 ft)

Population (2025-12-31)
  - Total: 1,131
  - Density: 55.74/km^{2} (144.4/sq mi)
- Time zone: UTC+01:00 (CET)
  - Summer (DST): UTC+02:00 (CEST)
- Postal codes: 86684
- Dialling codes: 08276
- Vehicle registration: DON
- Website: www.gemeinde-holzheim.de

Holzheim (German pronunciation: [ˈhɔltshaɪm]) is a municipality in the district of Donau-Ries in Bavaria in Germany.

The community had 1,012 inhabitants in 1970, 1,006 in 1987, and 1,145 in 2000.
