= Forellenbach =

Forellenbach may refer to following rivers of Germany:

- Forellenbach (Eger) of Bavaria, tributary of the Eger
- Forellenbach (Vils) of Bavaria, tributary of the Vils
- Forellenbach (Weser) of North Rhine-Westphalia, tributary of the Weser
