= Forellenbach (Eger) =

River in Bavaria, Germany

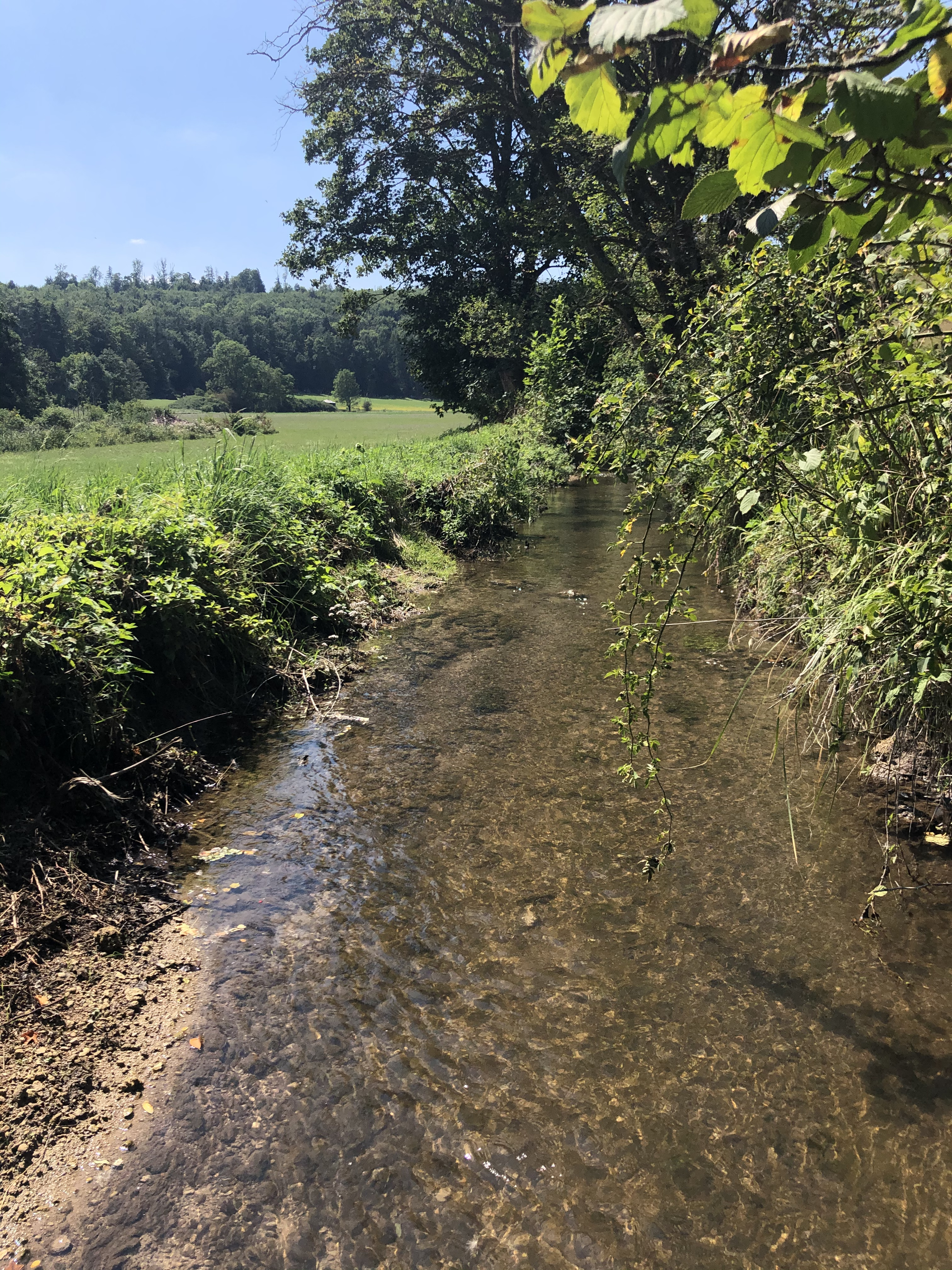

Location
- Country: Germany
- State: Bavaria

Physical characteristics
- Mouth
  - location: Near Möttingen into the Eger
  - coordinates: 48.8155°N 10.5909°E

Basin features
- Progression: Eger→ Wörnitz→ Danube→ Black Sea

Forellenbach is a river of Bavaria, Germany. It is a right tributary of the Eger near Möttingen.

== See also ==
- List of rivers of Bavaria
