= Linnenbeeke =

River in Germany

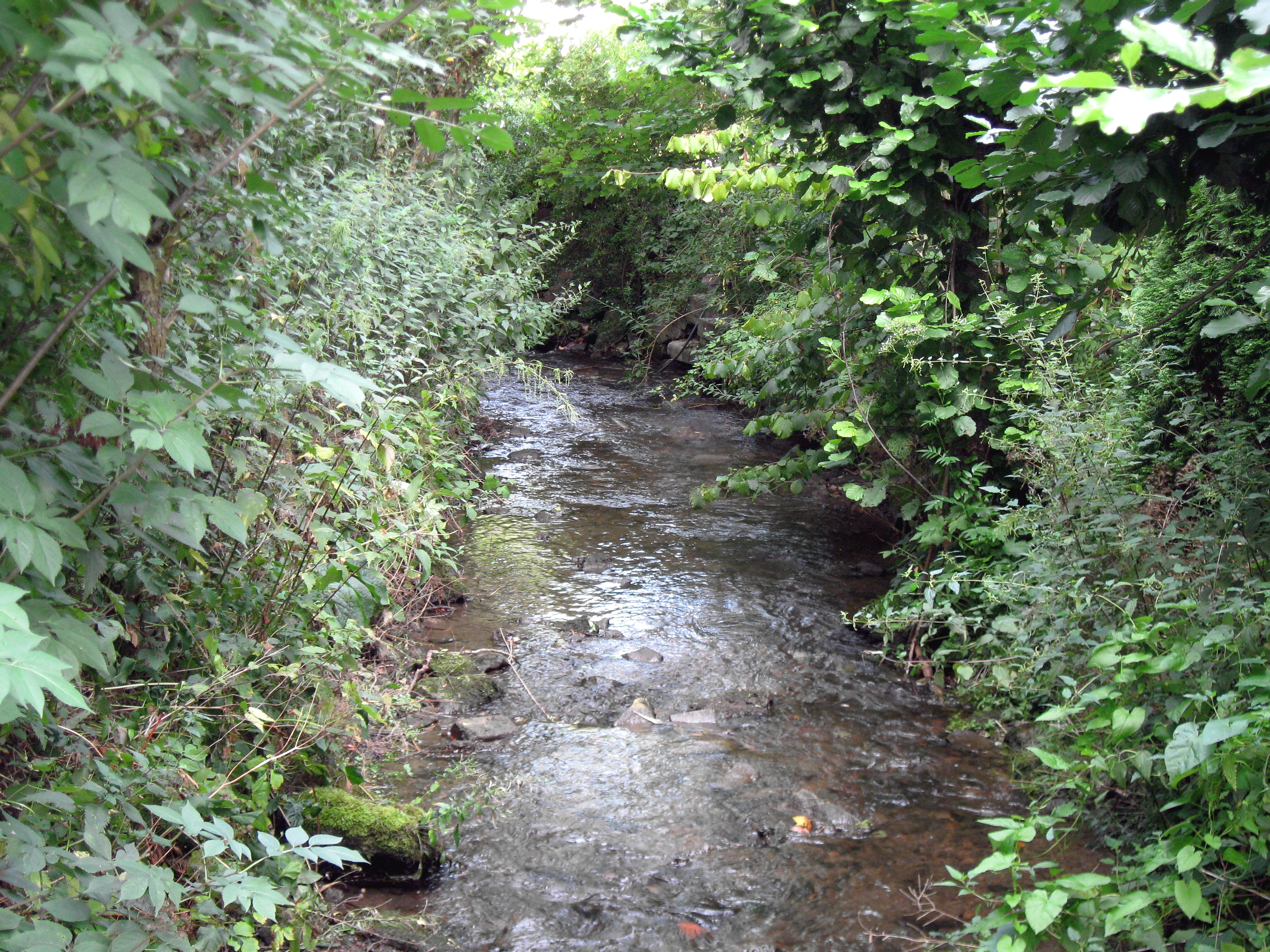

Location
- Country: Germany
- States: North Rhine-Westphalia

Physical characteristics
- Mouth
  - location: Forellenbach
  - coordinates: 52.1540°N 8.8416°E

Basin features
- Progression: Forellenbach→ Weser→ North Sea

Linnenbeeke is a small river of North Rhine-Westphalia, Germany. It is 6.8 km long and flows into the Forellenbach as a right tributary near Vlotho.

== See also ==
- List of rivers of North Rhine-Westphalia
