= Eger (Wörnitz) =

River in Germany

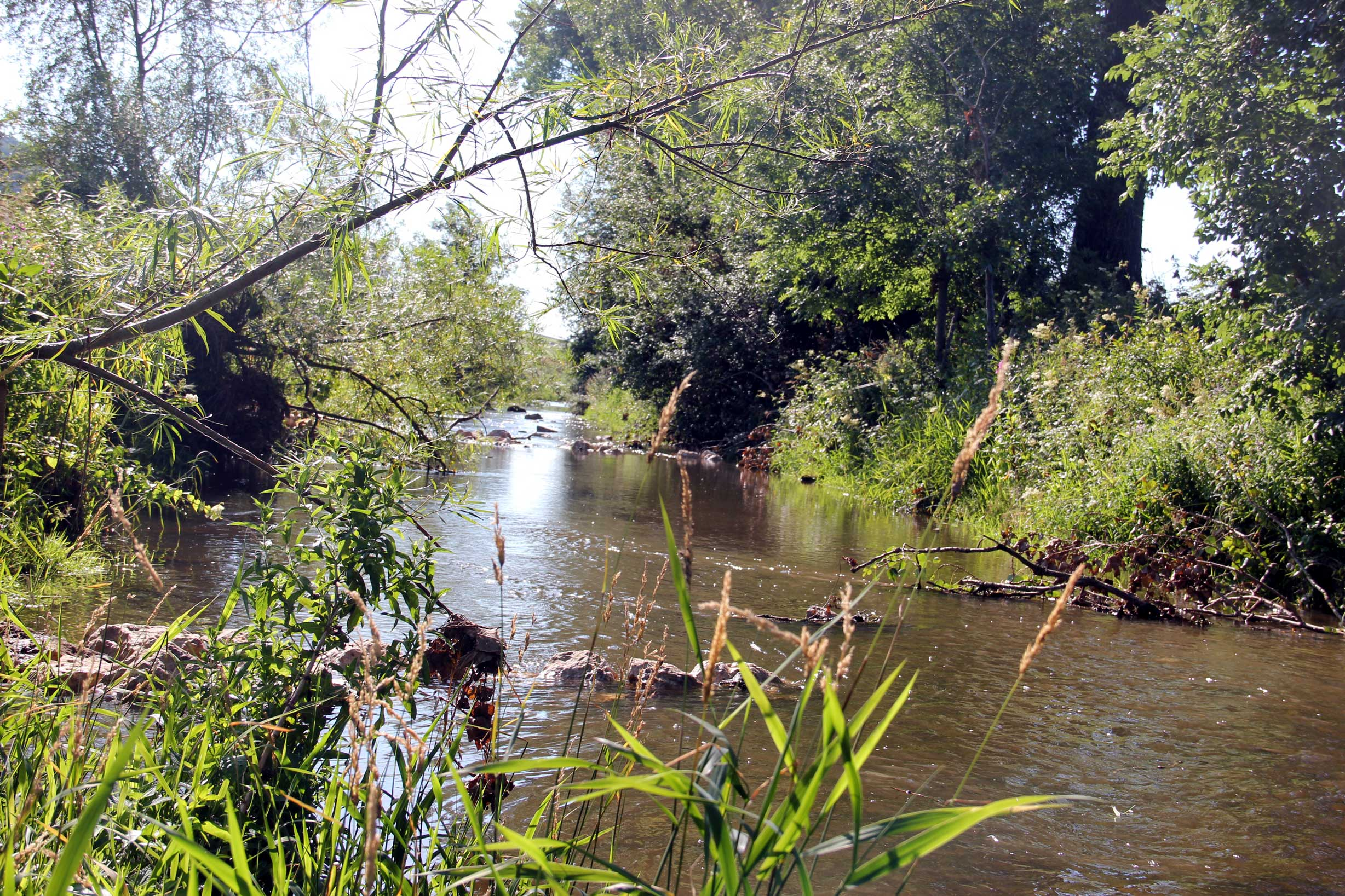
- The Eger at Bopfingen

Location
- Country: Germany
- States: Baden-Württemberg and Bavaria

Physical characteristics
- Mouth
  - location: Wörnitz
  - coordinates: 48.8083°N 10.6367°E
- Length: 36.8 km (22.9 mi)
- Basin size: 443 km^{2} (171 sq mi)

Basin features
- Progression: Wörnitz→ Danube→ Black Sea

Eger is a river of Baden-Württemberg and of Bavaria, Germany. It is a right tributary of the Wörnitz near Harburg.

== See also ==
- List of rivers of Baden-Württemberg
- List of rivers of Bavaria
