= Harburg Castle =

Medieval castle in Bavaria, Germany

Coordinates: 48°47′6″N 10°41′13″E

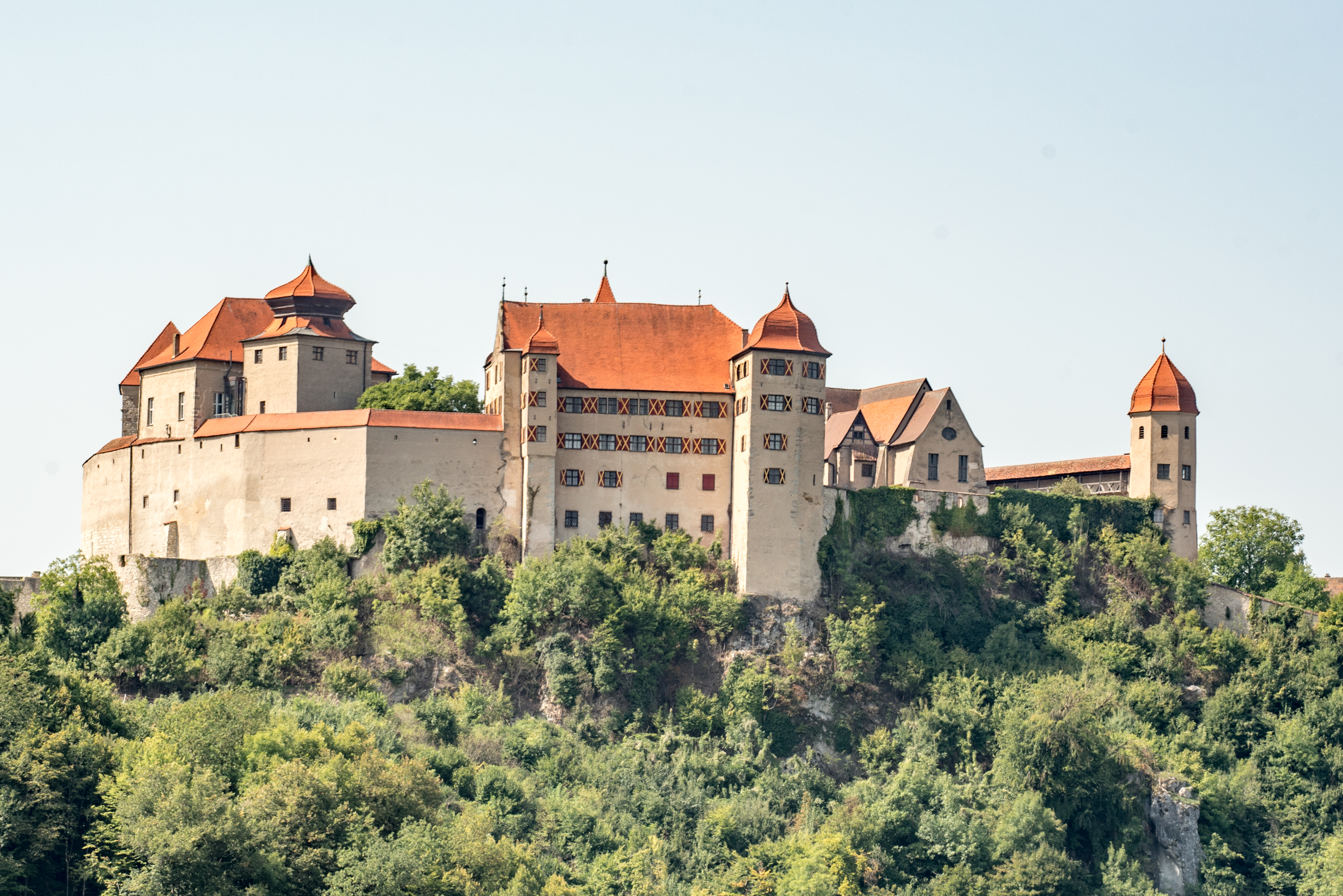
Harburg Castle

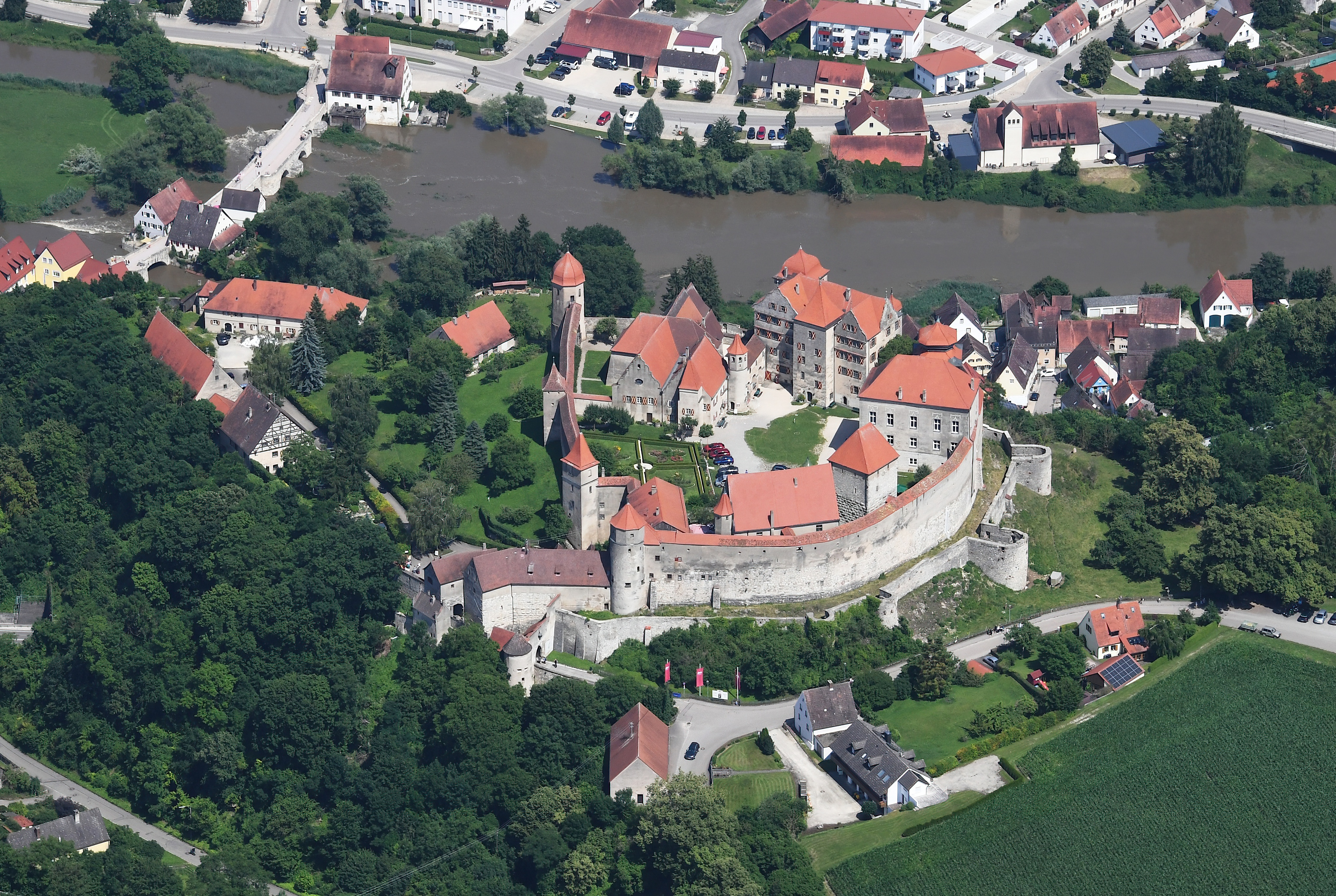
Aerial image of Harburg Castle

Harburg Castle in Harburg, Bavaria, in the Donau-Ries district, is an extensive mediaeval complex from the 11th / 12th century. Originally it was a Staufer castle and was owned by the princely House of Oettingen-Wallerstein. Since 2000 the castle belongs to the Prince of Oettingen-Wallerstein Cultural Foundation, which has the mission to preserve this unique castle for the present and future.

== History ==
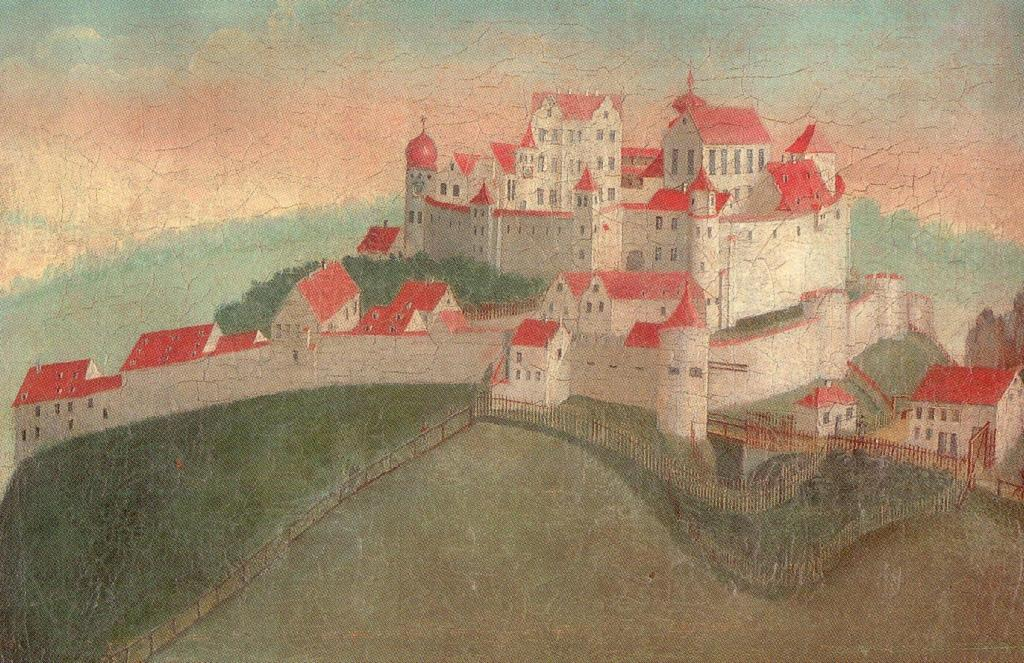
Harburg Castle, 17th century

The first written mention of Harburg can be derived from the mention of Cuno de Horburc (Kuno of Harburg) in sources on the foundation of the Benedictine monastery Berchtesgaden at the latest around the year 1100. Kuno of Harburg was half-brother of Berchtesgaden's founder Berengar of Sulzbach and apparently owner of the Harburg at the end of the 11th century.

The castle itself was first mentioned in 1150. At that time, the 13-year-old Staufer Henry Berengar, son and co-king of King Conrad III and Gertrude of Sulzbach, wrote a letter to Constantinople to his aunt, the Empress Berta of Sulzbach, and her husband Manuel Komnenos, in which he spoke of the Battle of Flochberg against Welf VI. He mentioned that at that time he was staying at Harburg Castle, which was at that time a Staufian imperial castle.

“On the 8th of February [1150], that lofty and unfaithful Welf, who did not want to remember all the blessings he had received from my father, entered our country with hostility. At the time when my father, being far away in state affairs, left me with a group of warriors in one of our castles. The castle against which Welf moved is called Flochberg Castle. But we were in another castle, Harburg Castle. [...] But when I had quickly received the news of this disgrace, I hastened to pursue the enemy, and we advanced against him with five large battalions. Having sent forward very mobile horsemen, who cut off their way of escape, we obtained such a great victory that, if it were to be We captured 300 knights and a considerable number of horses were killed, struck partly by spears, partly by swords.

— Henry Berengar, in letterbook from Wibald of Corvey, no. 218, p. 464,

In 1299 the castle was pledged by King Albert I of the House of Habsburg to the Counts of Oettingen. King Conrad IV lived on the Harburg Castle in 1239. Emperor Sigismund confirmed the property of the Counts of Oettingen in 1418. In 1530 the historian Hieronymus Wolf was a clerk at Harburg Castle. After the extinction of the protestant line Oettingen-Oettingen, Harburg Castle was transferred to the catholic line Oettingen-Wallerstein in 1731.

The Castle was utilised in World War 2 by the Nazi's secret police "gestapo" and used to house prisoners for interrogation purposes.

Since 2000, the castle belongs to the prince of Oettingen-Wallerstein Cultural Foundation.

== Geographical location ==
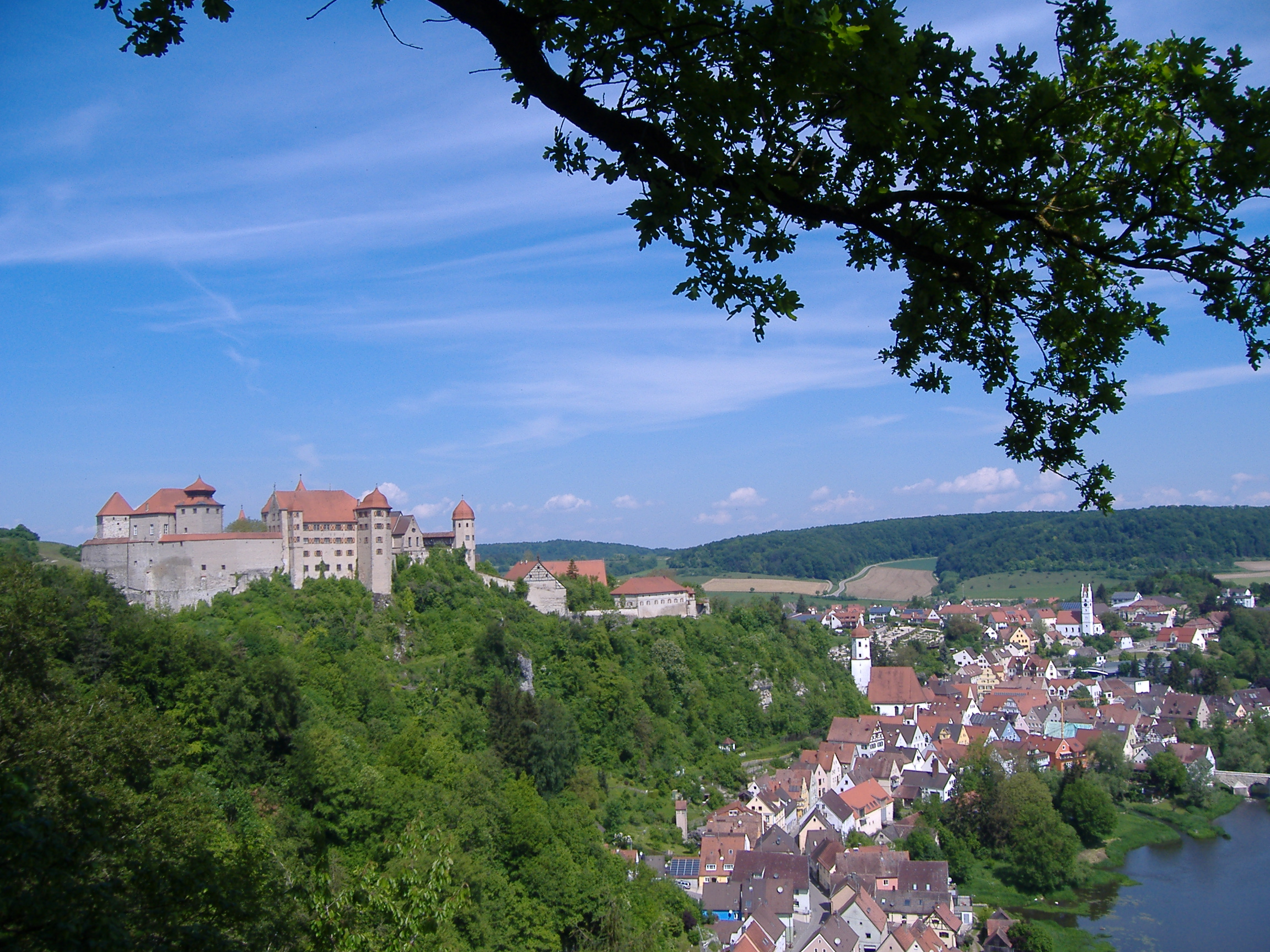
castle and town

The Harburg Castle is located high above the valley of the Wörnitz River on a steep mountain spur falling to three sides at the south-eastern entrance of the Ries Crater on the Romantic Road. The castle was built without reference to an older valley settlement, a process that was extremely rare in the High Middle Ages. Only after the castle was in place was the town Harburg developed on the narrow valley floor between the Wörnitz and the castle rock. The enormous size of the core castle may also allow conclusions to be drawn about the revitalization of a pre-historic or early-historic Hillfort.

== Architecture ==
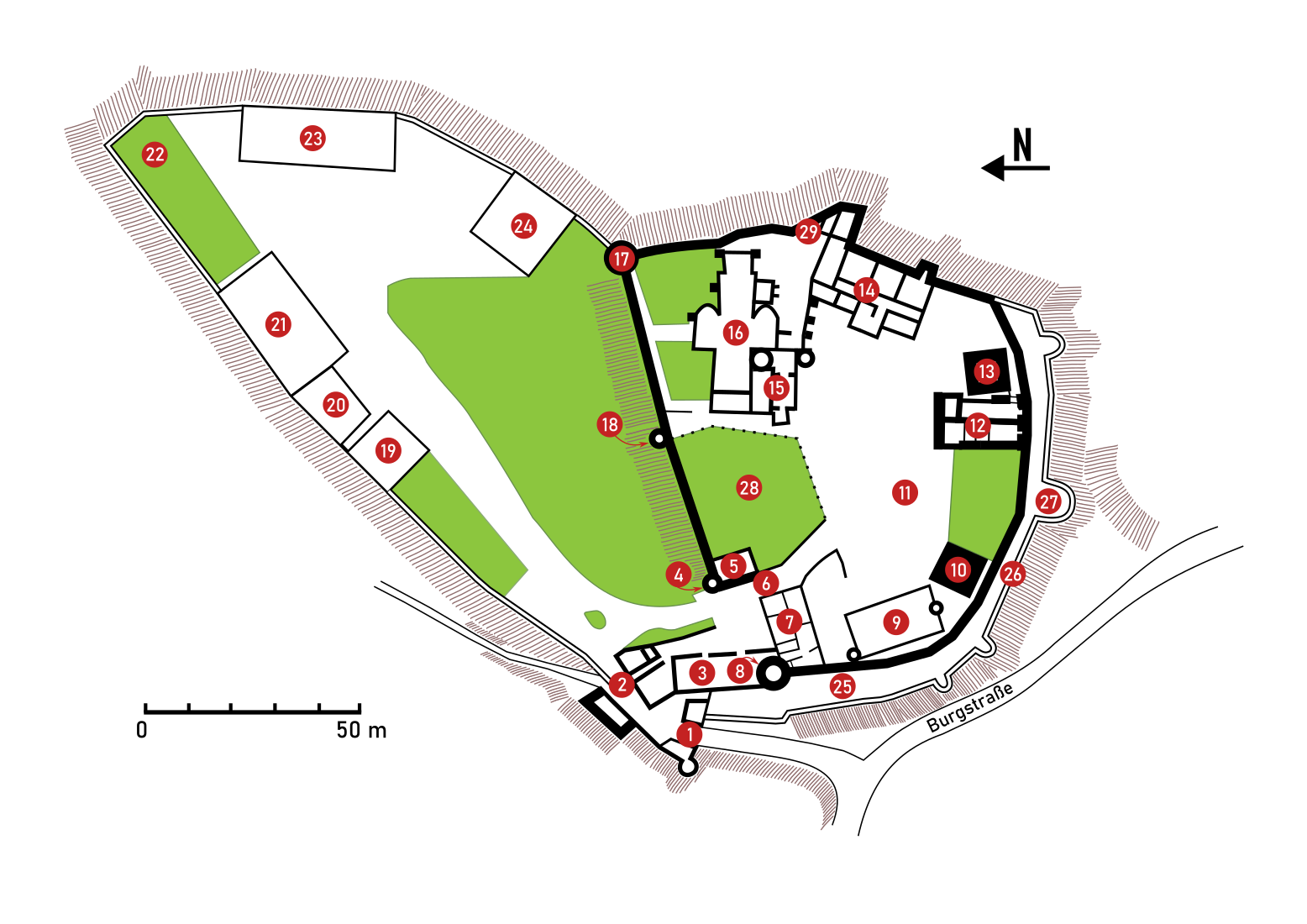
The layout of the castle complex: (1) Lower Gate, (2) Inner Gate, (3) Red Stables, (4) White Tower, (5) House of the tower servant, (6) Upper Gate, (7) Restaurant, (8) Prison Tower, (9) Granary, (10) Keep/Dungeon, (11) Well, (12) Great Hall, (13) Keep/Stair Tower, (14) Palace/Princes Building, (15) Bakery (Shop), (16) Church, (17) Bell Tower, (18) Water Tower, (19) Administrators Building, (20) Barn, (21) Tithe Barn, (22) Area of the Brewery (burnt down in 1873), (23) Former Stables, (24) Guildhall, (25) Outer Ward, (26) Outer Wall, (27) Bastion, (28) Garden, (29) Viewing Platform

This hill castle is a completely preserved facility with a remarkable building complex from the Middle Ages. In the 15th century the fortress was extended with residential buildings. From the 16th to the 18th century further extensions completed a prince's residence. Under Prince Albert Ernest II of Oettingen-Oettingen (1669 – 1731), the castle was to be expanded into a residence in the 18th century. However, only one part, which includes the castle church, the prince's building and the hall building, has actually been altered accordingly. The character of a fortified castle remained. Pretty unique is the particularly well-preserved, late-medieval ring wall with defensive corridor.

The main castle is surrounded by a wall with six towers, which is one of the oldest buildings. It includes the bailiff's residence (today the restaurant and hotel), the granary, the two keeps, the palace, the hall building, the well, the bakery (today the ticket office and shop) and the chapel. A little further down is the outer bailey with the commercial buildings, including the Red Stabels. It is said to have been sketched by Carl Spitzweg during a visit in 1858.

Three gates lead into the interior of the castle. The Lower Gate controlled access to the enclosure with a drawbridge. Since 1807 a stone bridge leads over the moat. Then follows the Inner Gate, which dates back to the Staufian period. It forms together with the Lower Gate an inner bailey. The main castle can be reached through the Upper Gate, equipped with a portcullis. It could be lifted smoothly by chains in two side guides and lowered in case of danger.

== Tourism ==
The interior of Harburg Castle can be visited daily as part of a guided tour from mid-March to early November.

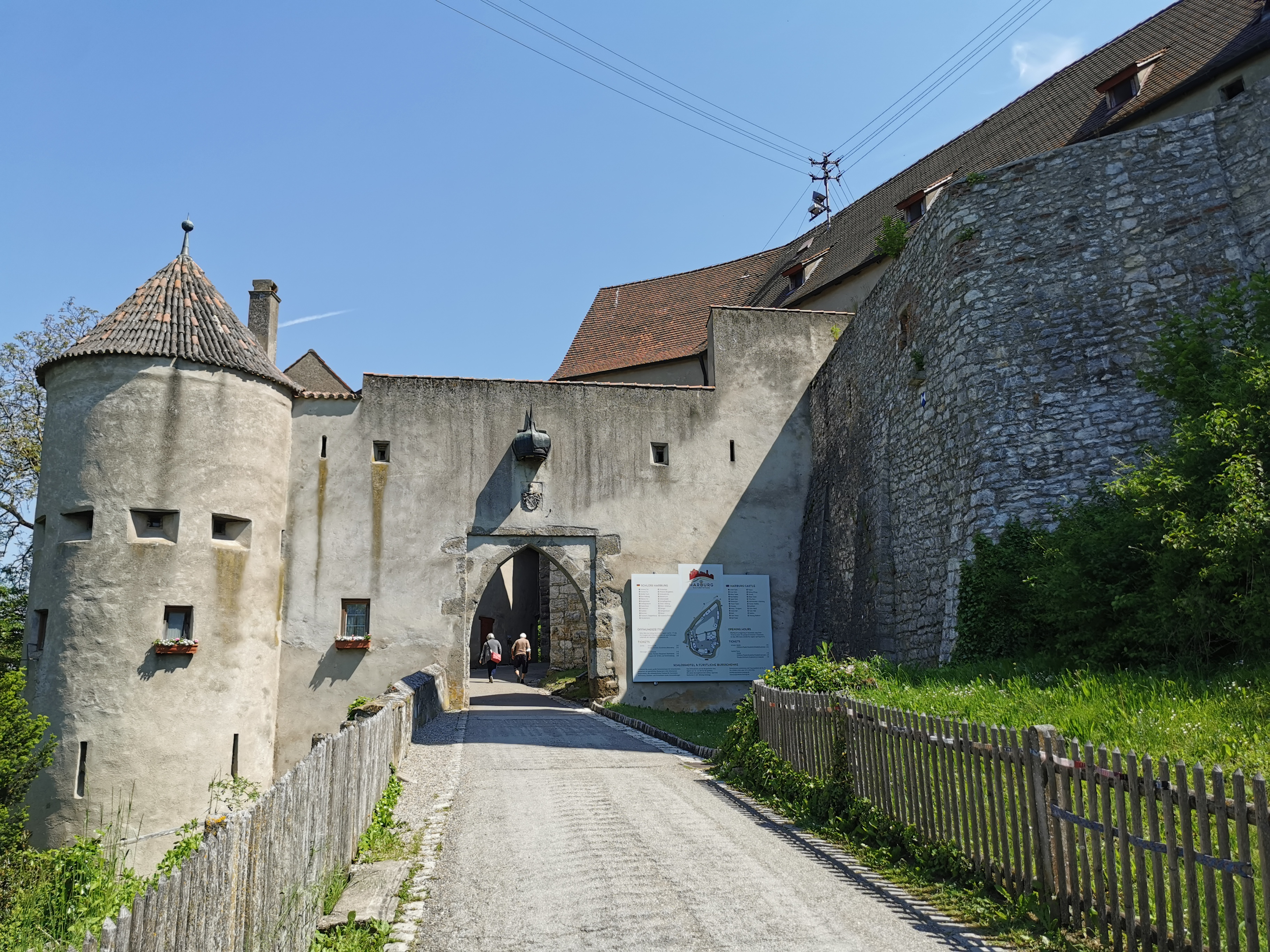
Lower Gate

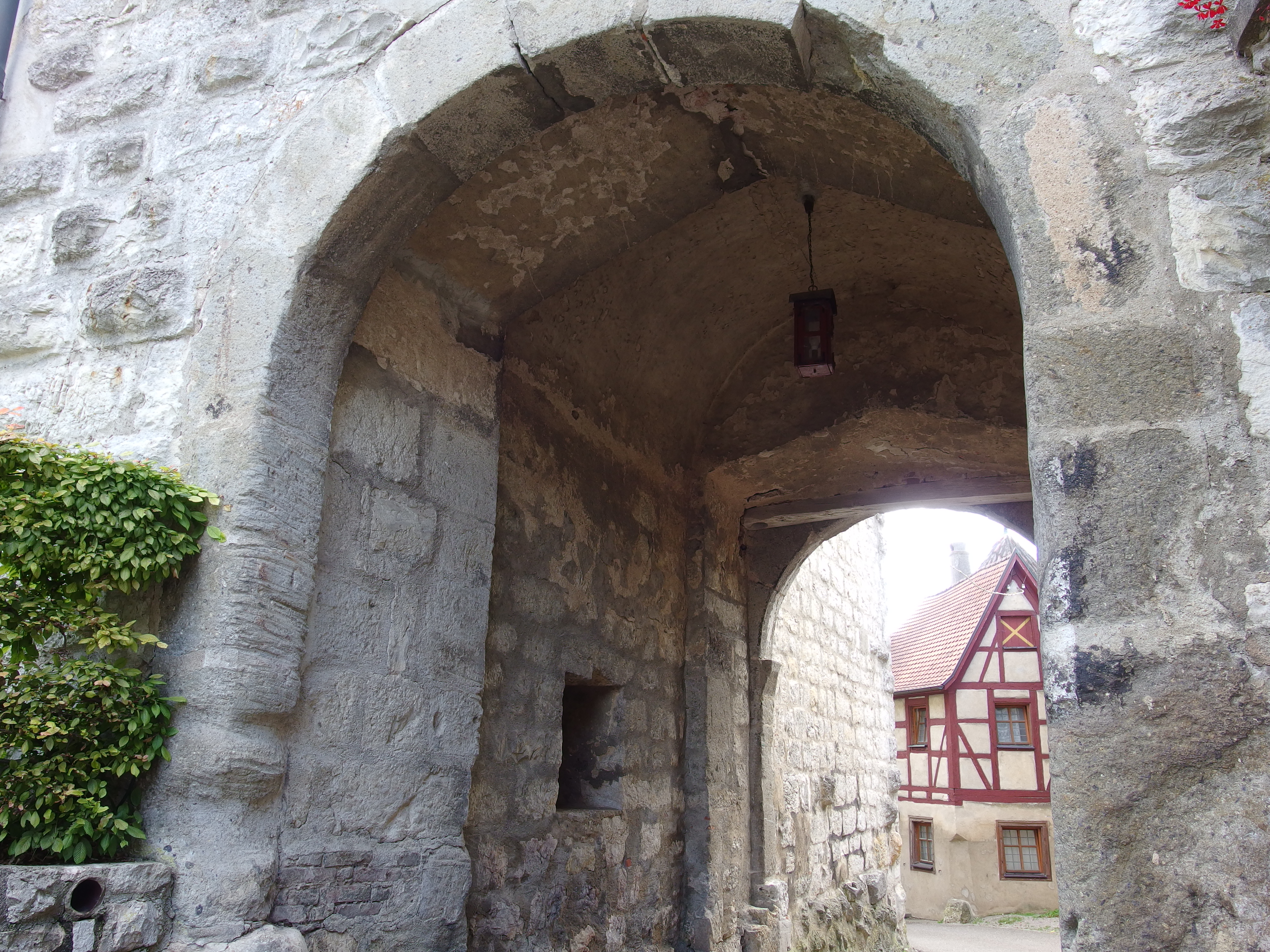
Inner Gate

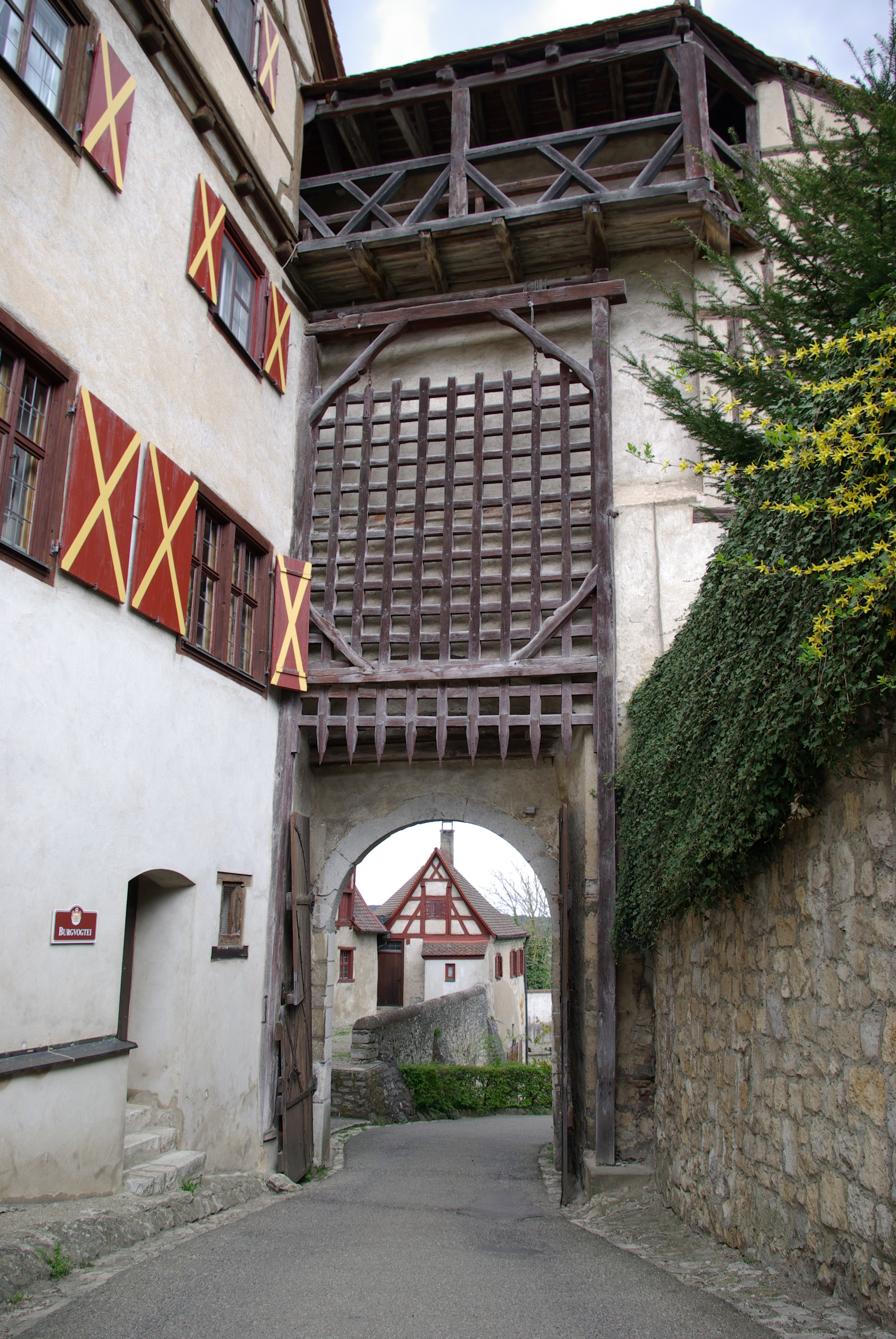
Upper Gate

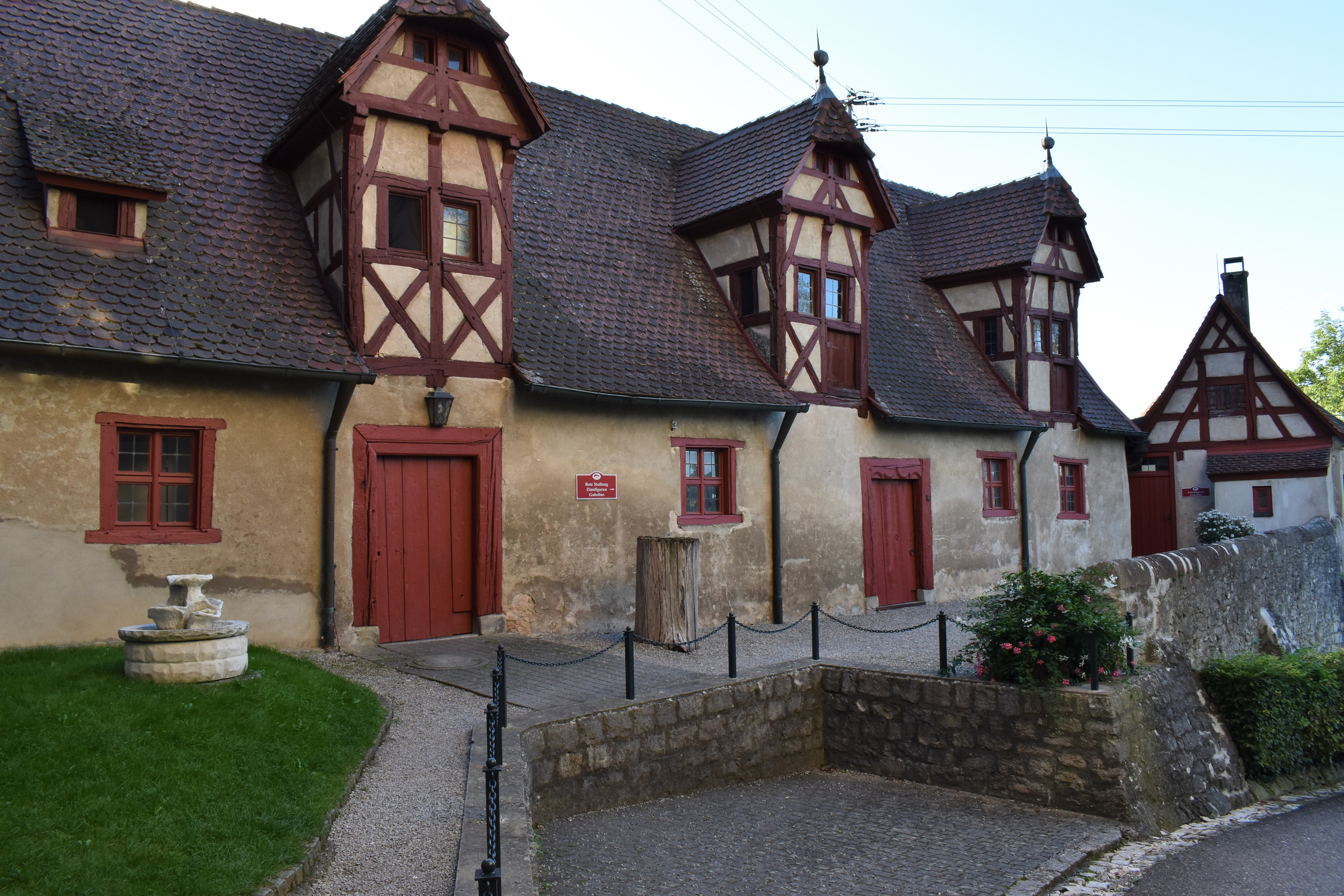
Red Stables

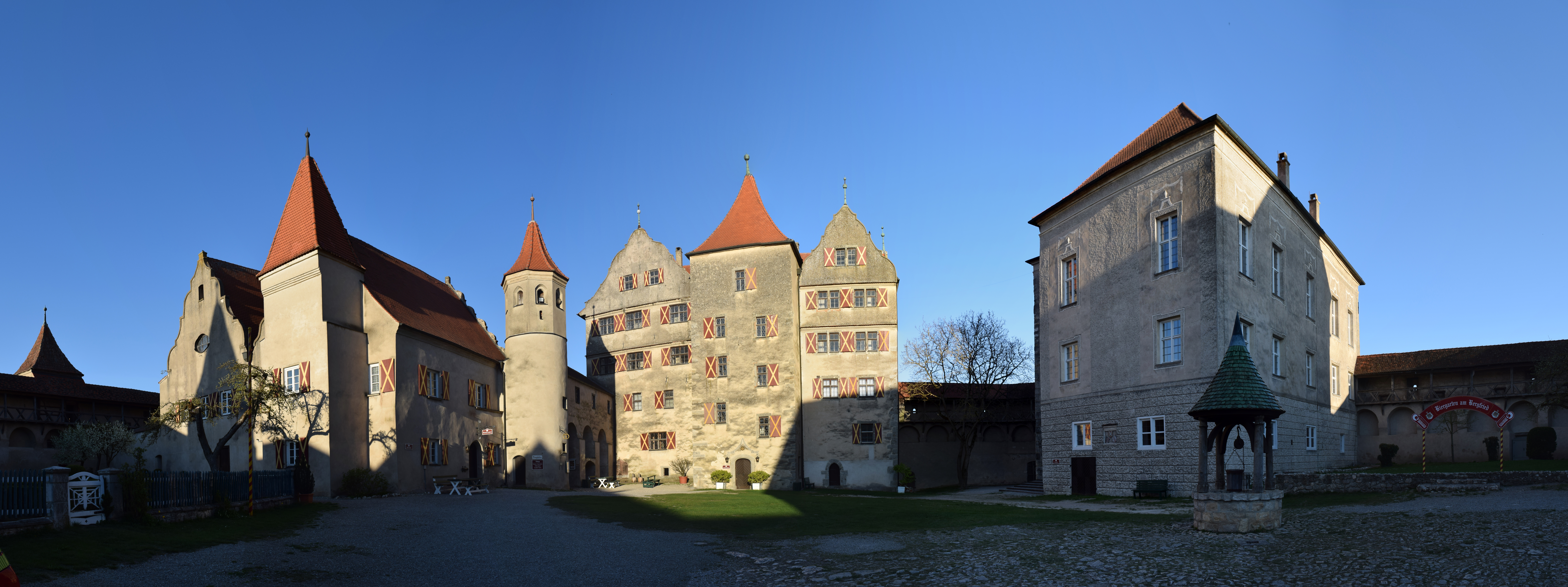
Inner Ward

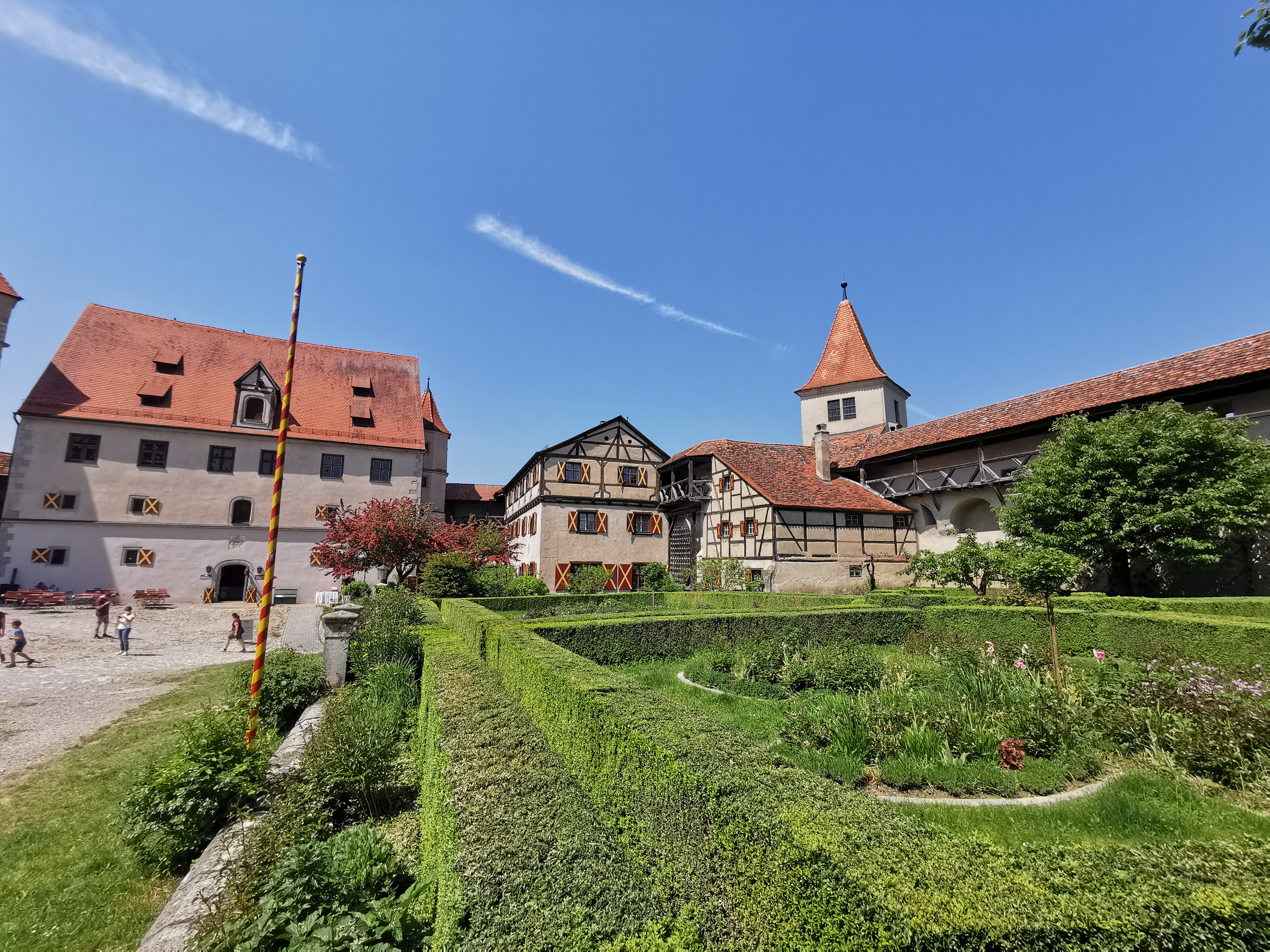
garden

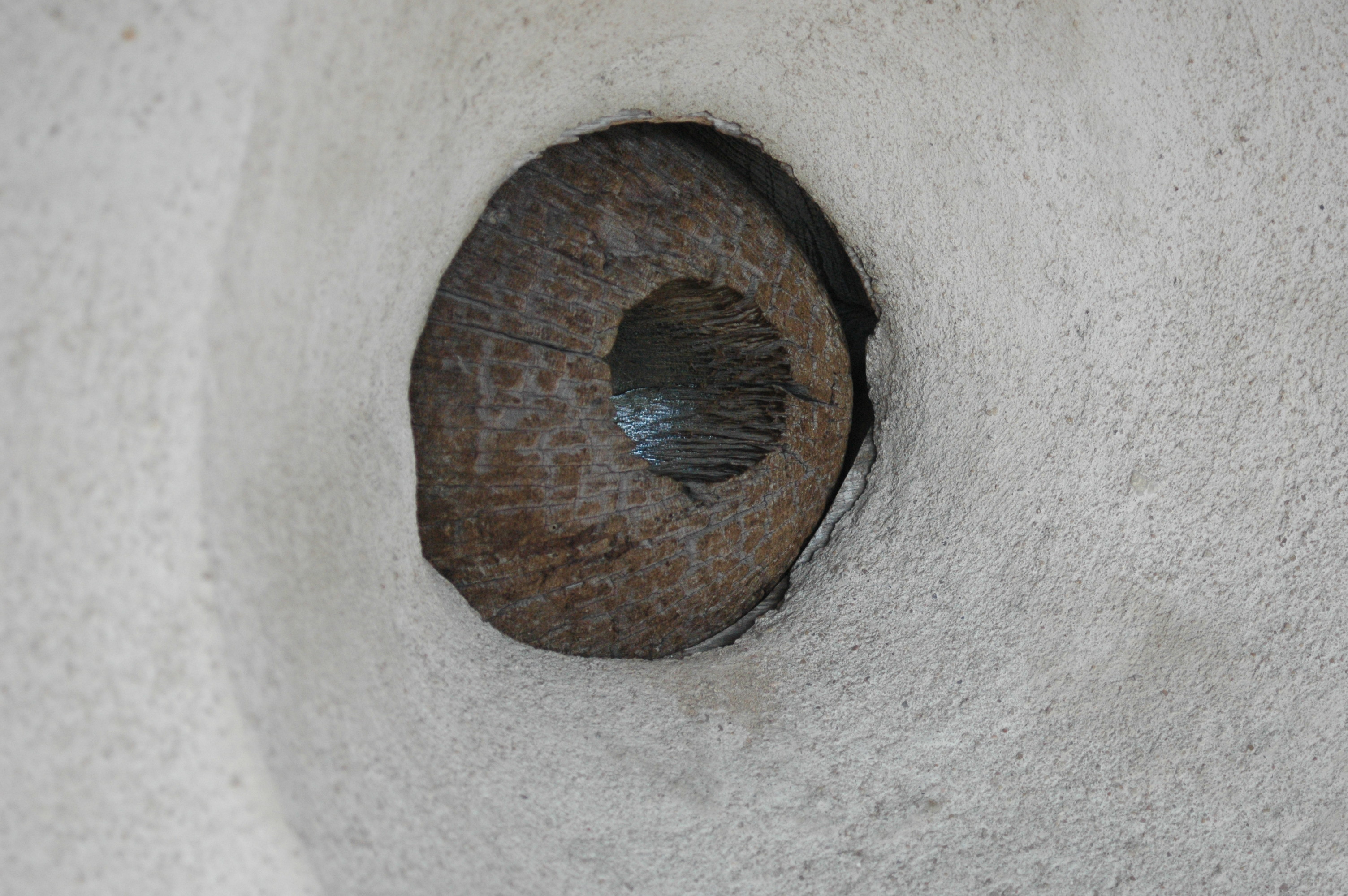
A wooden eye

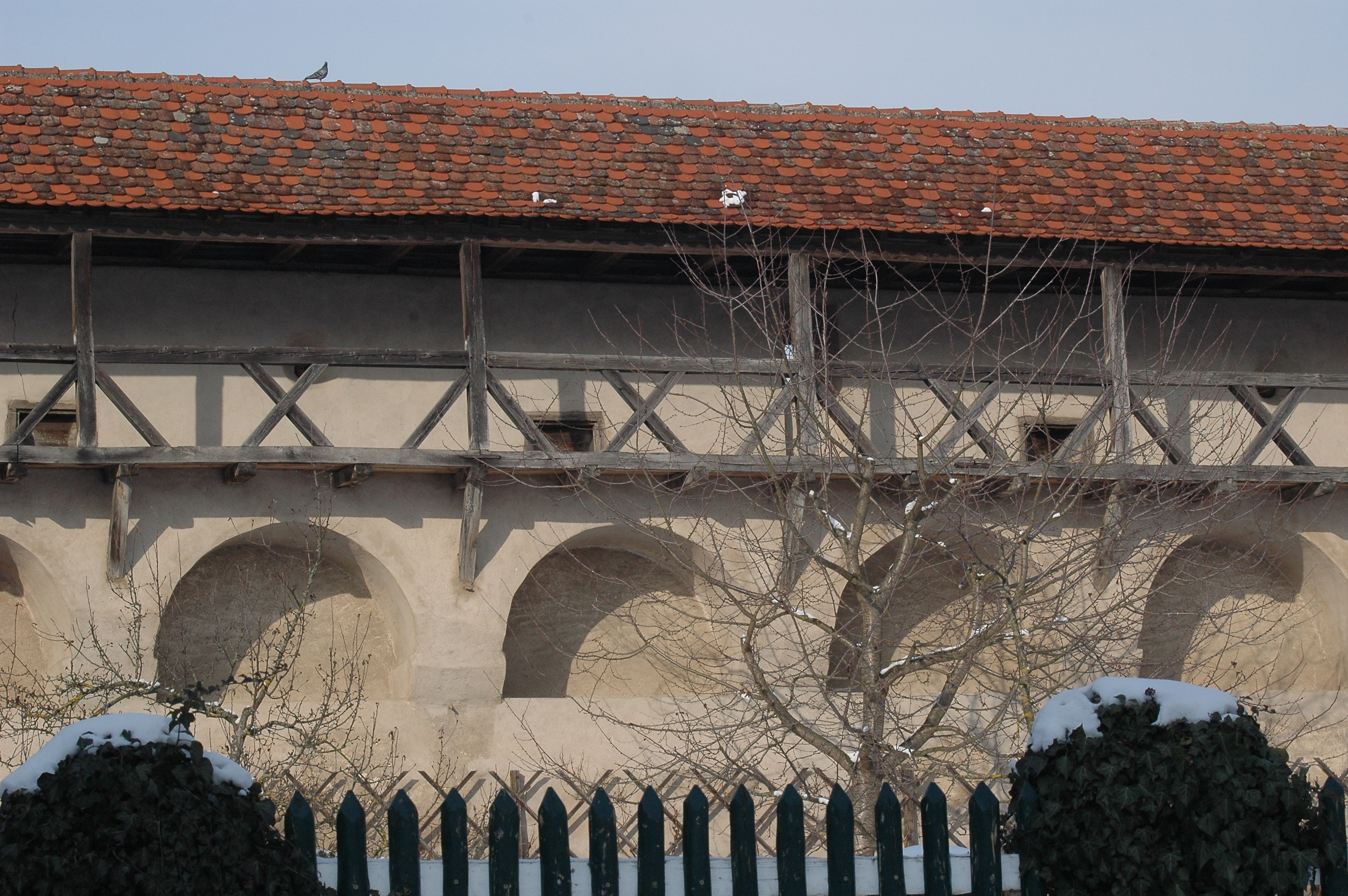
The defensive corridor
