= Romantic Road =

Theme route in Germany

- Romantische Straße
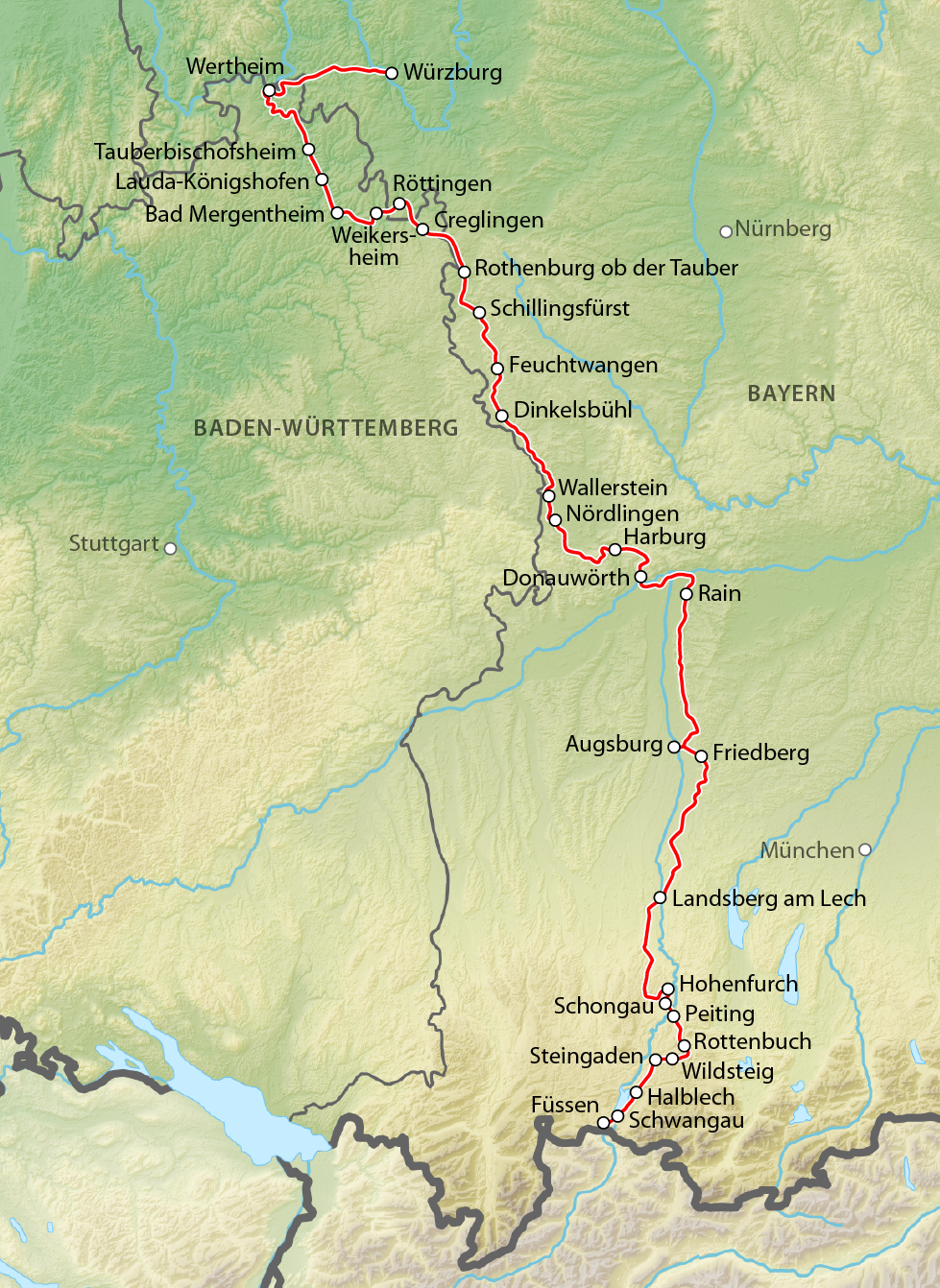

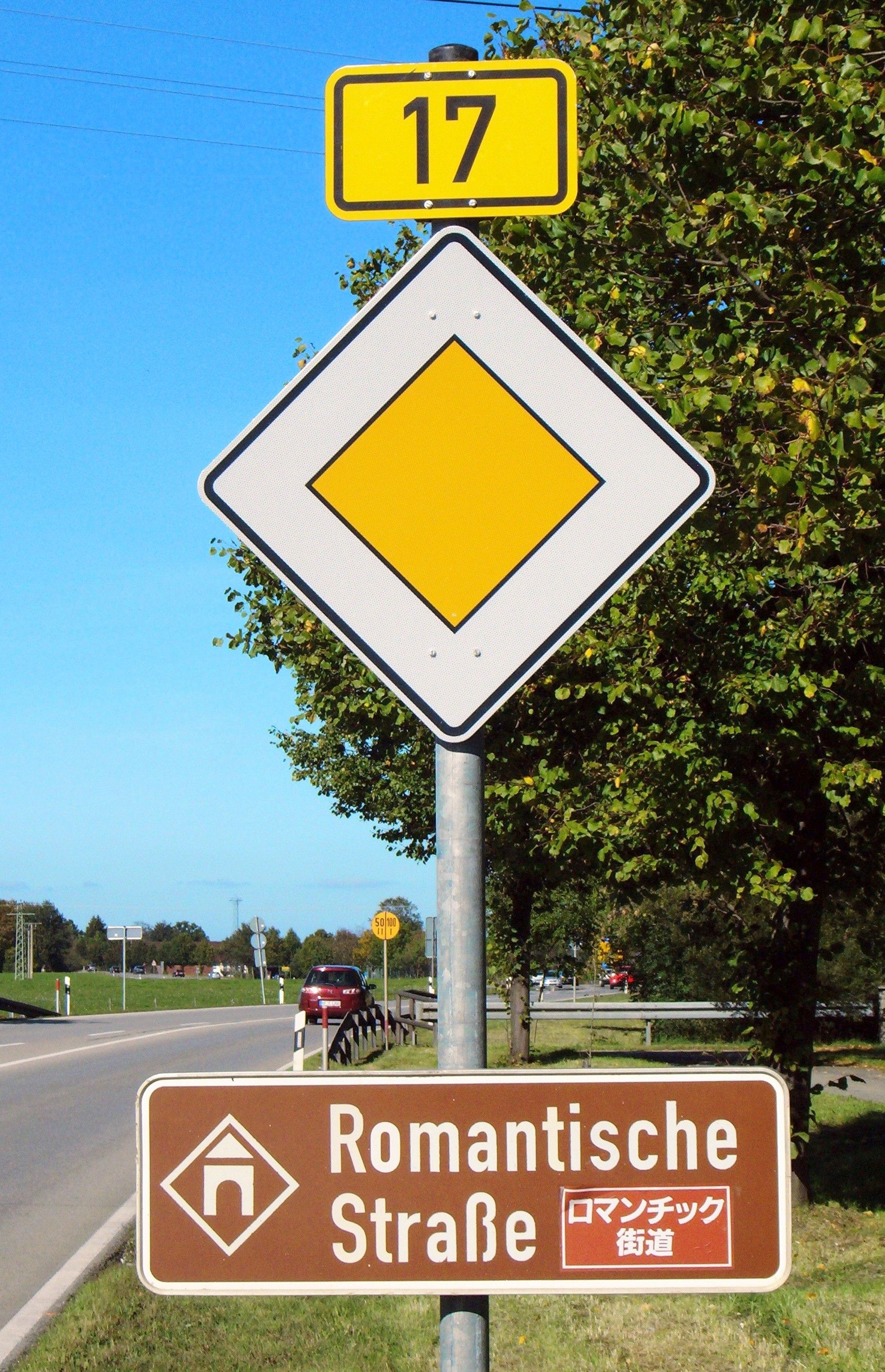

Route information
- Length: 413 km (257 mi)
- Component highways: B 2; B 8; B 16; B 17; B 25; B 290

Location
- Country: Germany
- States: Bavaria, Baden-Württemberg

Highway system
- Roads in Germany; Autobahns; List; Federal; List; State; E-roads

The Romantic Road (German: Romantische Straße, pronounced [ʁoˈmantɪʃə ˈʃtʁaːsə]) is a "theme route" devised by promotion-minded travel agents in the 1950s. It describes the 460 kilometres (290 miles) of surface roads between Würzburg and Füssen in southern Germany, specifically in Bavaria and Baden-Württemberg, linking a number of picturesque towns and castles. In medieval times, part of it was a trade route that connected the center of Germany with the south. Today, this region is thought by many international travellers to possess "quintessentially German" scenery and culture, in towns and cities such as Nördlingen, Dinkelsbühl and Rothenburg ob der Tauber and in castles such as Burg Harburg and the famous Neuschwanstein.

With about five million overnight stays, four to five times that number of day visits and around 15,000 jobs in tourism generated by the route, it is an economically important southern German travel destination.

Locations along the route, listed from north to south, include:

- Würzburg
- Holzkirchen (Unterfranken) (new itinerary since 2016)
- Urphar (new itinerary since 2016)
- Wertheim (new itinerary since 2016)
- Tauberbischofsheim
- Lauda-Königshofen
- Bad Mergentheim
- Weikersheim
- Röttingen
- Creglingen
- Rothenburg ob der Tauber
- Schillingsfürst
- Feuchtwangen
- Dinkelsbühl
- Wallerstein
- Nördlingen
- Harburg
- Donauwörth
- Augsburg
- Friedberg
- Kaufering
- Landsberg am Lech
- Hohenfurch
- Schongau
- Peiting
- Rottenbuch
- Wildsteig
- Steingaden and Wieskirche
- Halblech
- Schwangau, Neuschwanstein and Hohenschwangau
- Füssen
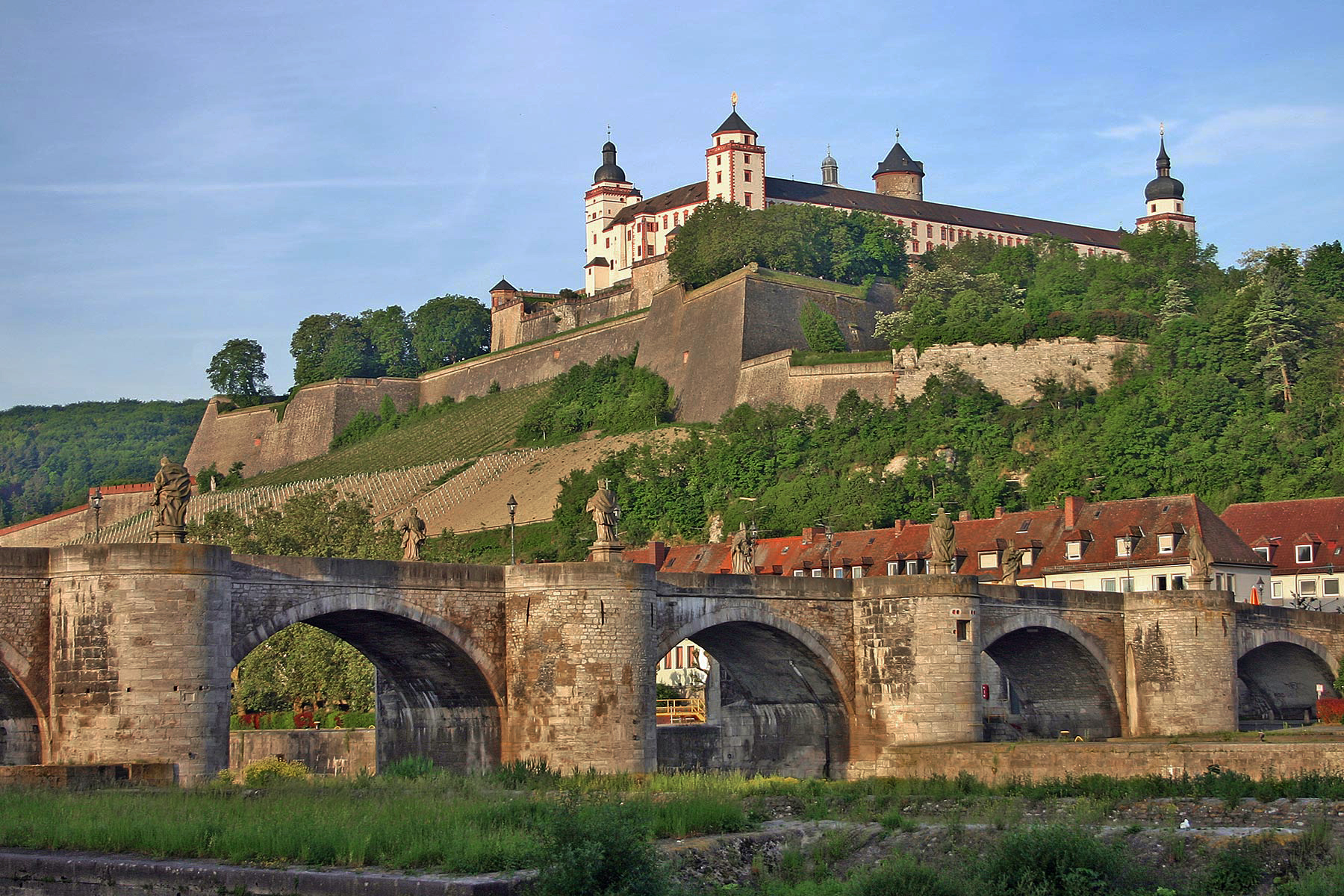
Würzburg

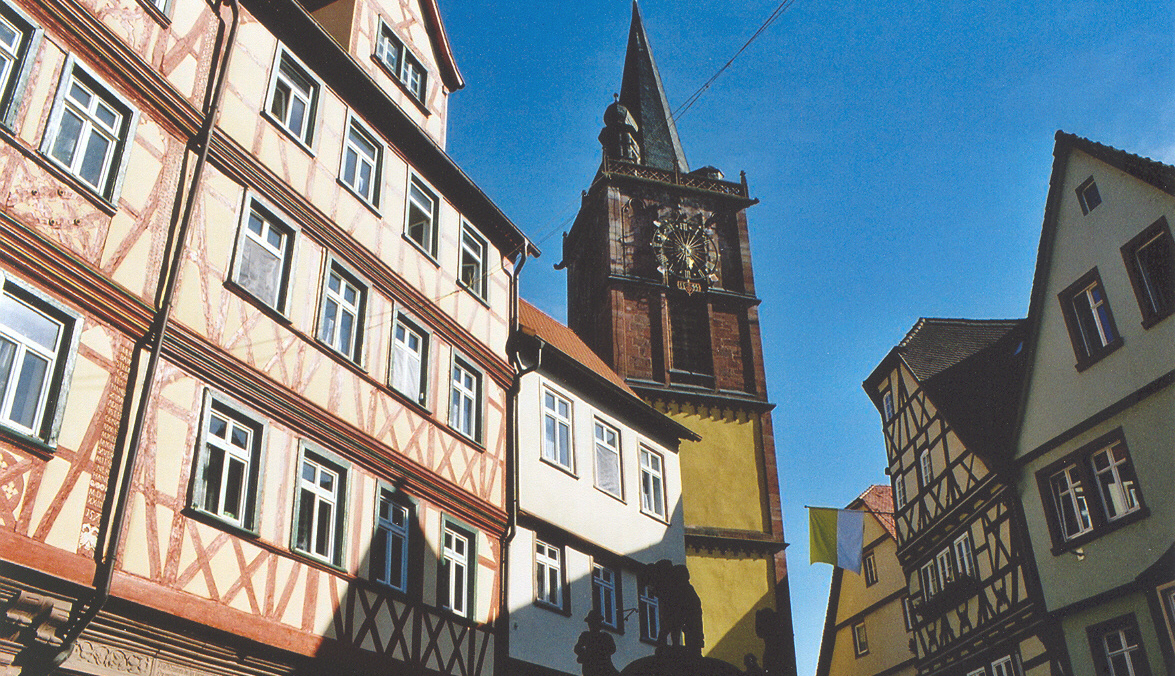
Wertheim

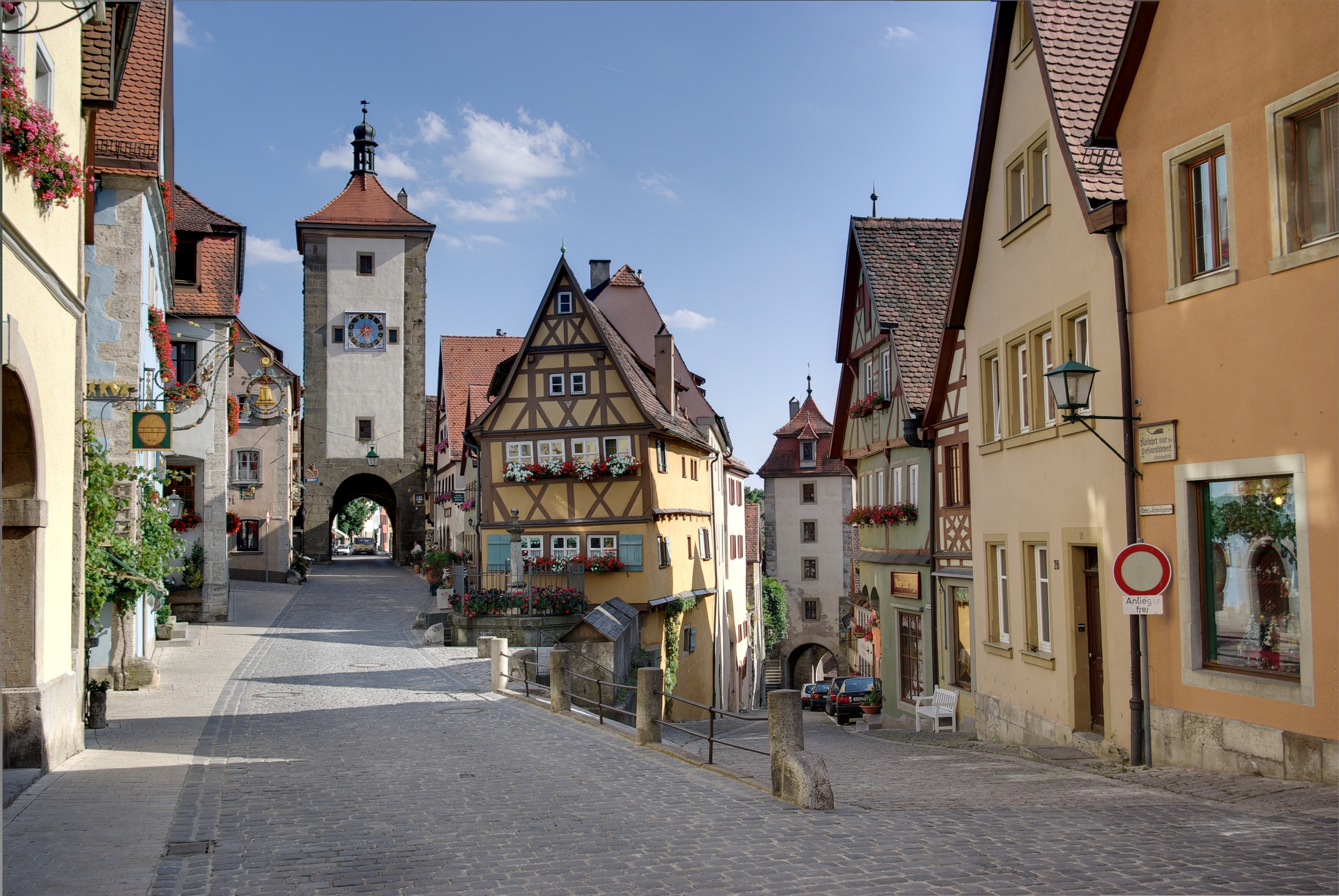
Rothenburg ob der Tauber

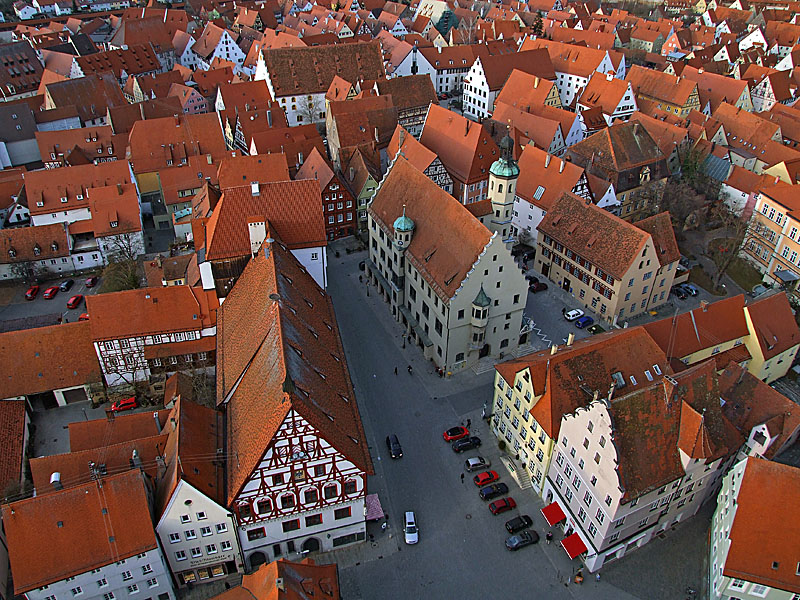
Nördlingen

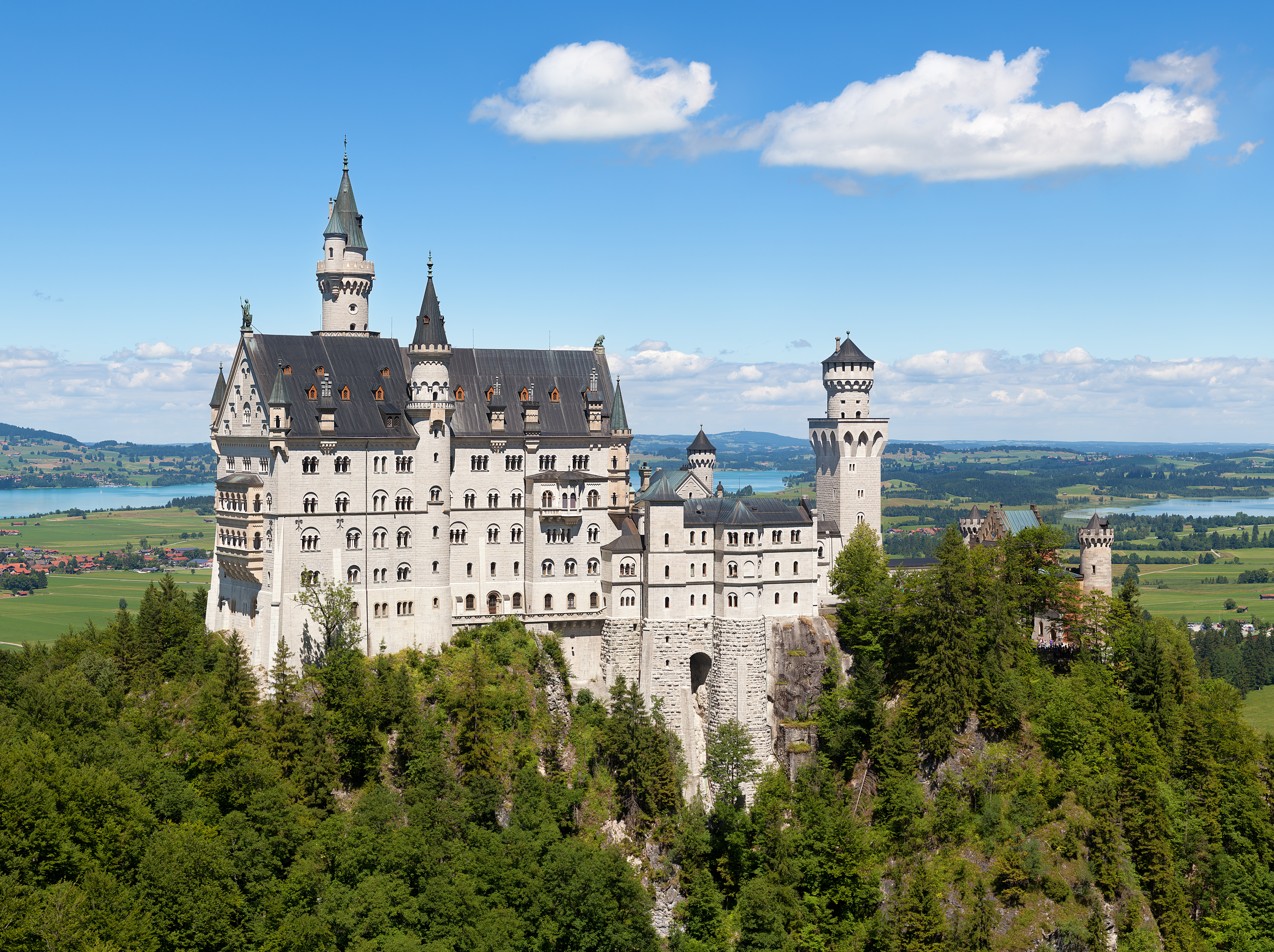
Neuschwanstein and Hohenschwangau

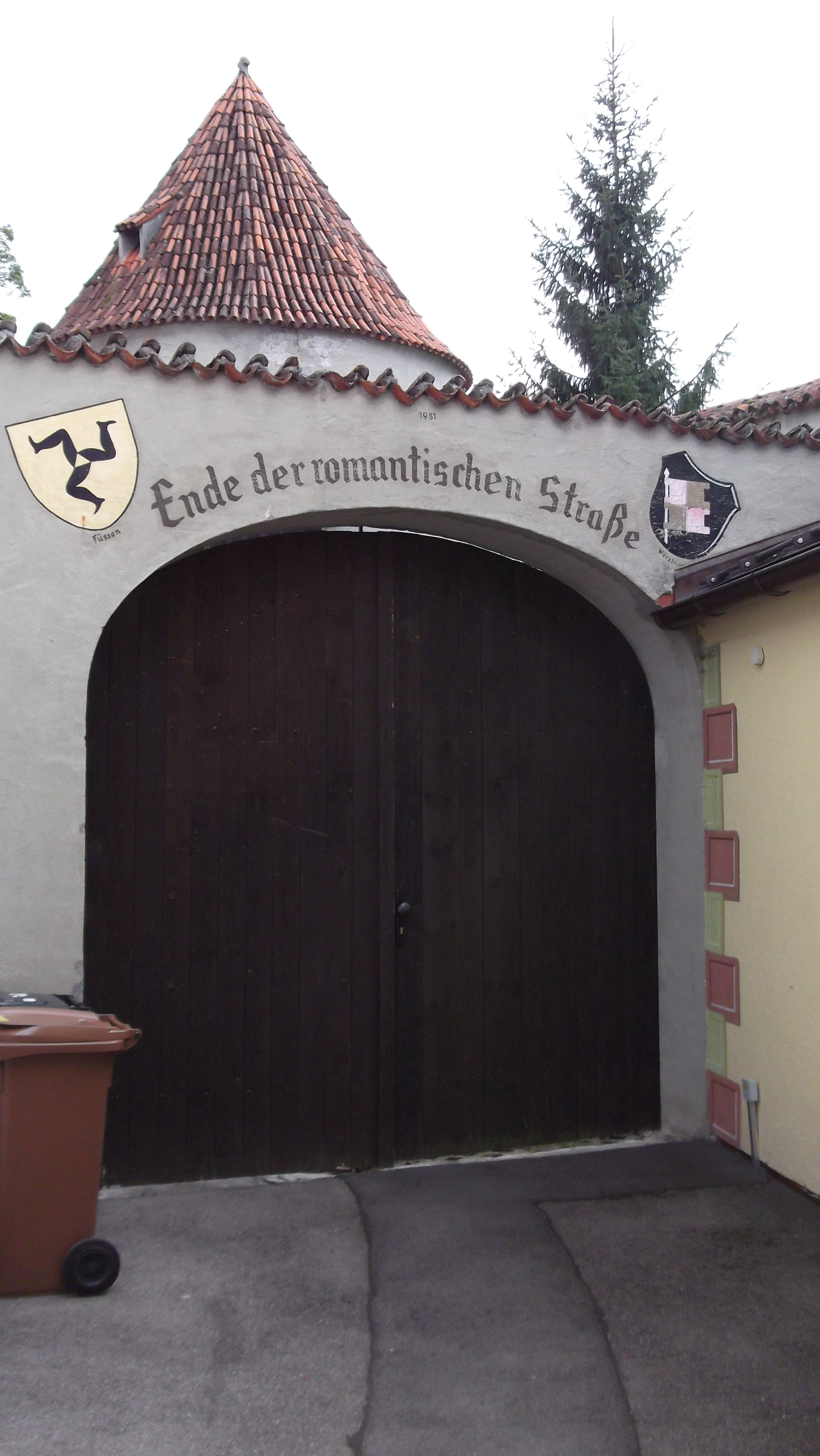
End of the Romantic Road at Abbey St. Stephan in Füssen

== See also ==
- Japan Romantic Road, the Romantic Road's sister route in Japan
