= Forellenbach (Vils) =

River in Germany

- The Forellenbach at Lauf, a part of Hohenfels

Location
- Country: Germany
- State: Bavaria

Physical characteristics
- Mouth
  - location: Vils
  - coordinates: 49.1843°N 11.9379°E
- Length: 13.3 km (8.3 mi)

Basin features
- Progression: Vils→ Naab→ Danube→ Black Sea

Forellenbach is a river of Bavaria, Germany. It is a right tributary of the Vils in Rohrbach.

== See also ==
- List of rivers of Bavaria
