= Möttingen =

- Municipality
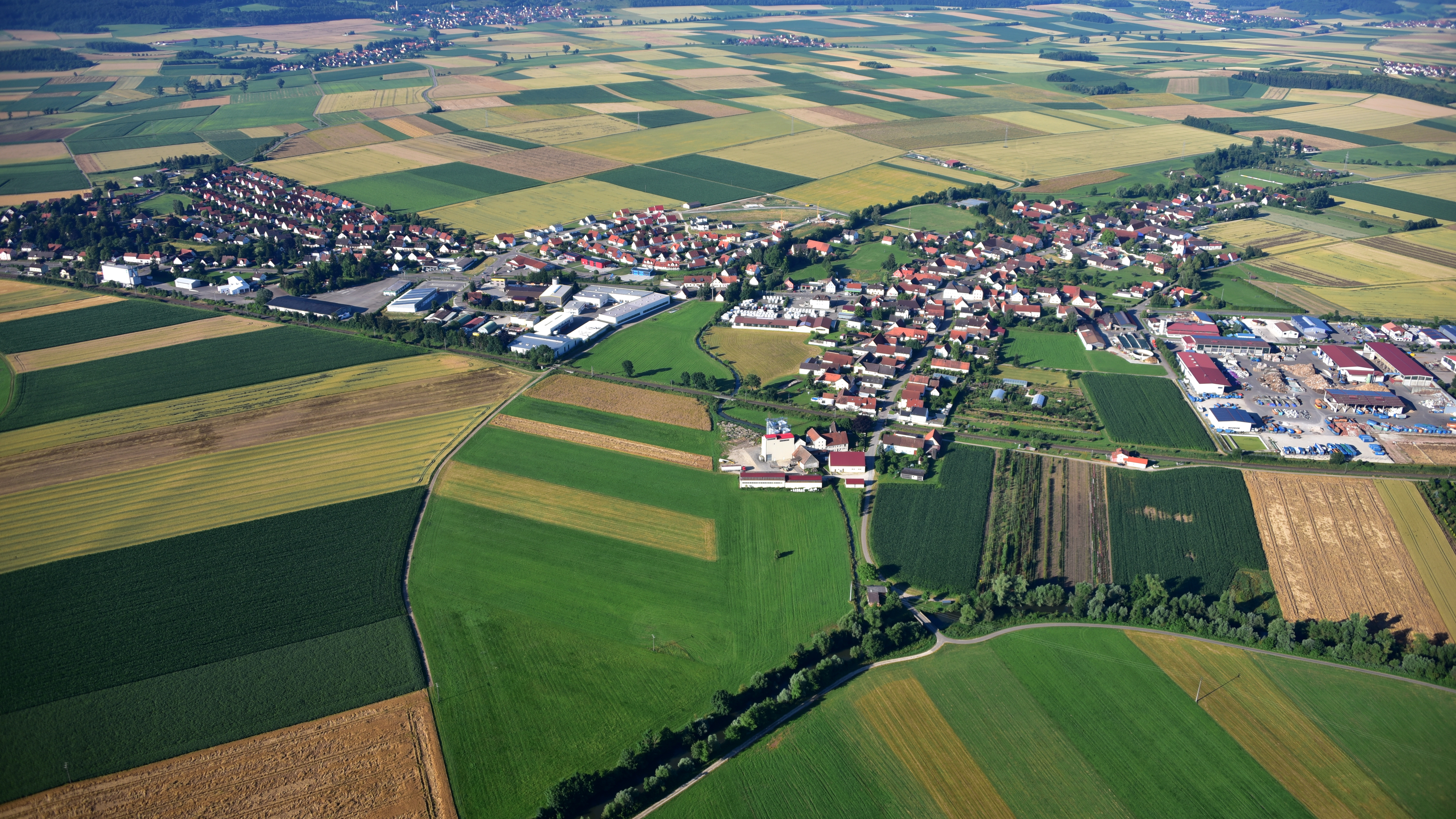
- Aerial view of Möttingen

- Coat of arms

- Location of Möttingen within Donau-Ries district
- Interactive map of Möttingen
- Location within Germany Location within Bavaria
- Coordinates: 48°49′N 10°35′E
- Country: Germany
- State: Bavaria
- Admin. region: Swabia
- District: Donau-Ries

Government
  - Mayor (2020–26): Timo Böllmann

Area
  - Total: 31.84 km^{2} (12.29 sq mi)
- Elevation: 415 m (1,362 ft)

Population (2025-12-31)
  - Total: 2,700
  - Density: 85/km^{2} (220/sq mi)
- Time zone: UTC+01:00 (CET)
  - Summer (DST): UTC+02:00 (CEST)
- Postal codes: 86753
- Dialling codes: 09083
- Vehicle registration: DON
- Website: www.moettingen.de

Möttingen (German pronunciation: [ˈmœtɪŋən]) is a municipality in the district of Donau-Ries in Bavaria in Germany.
