= Harburg, Bavaria =

Harburg
- Town
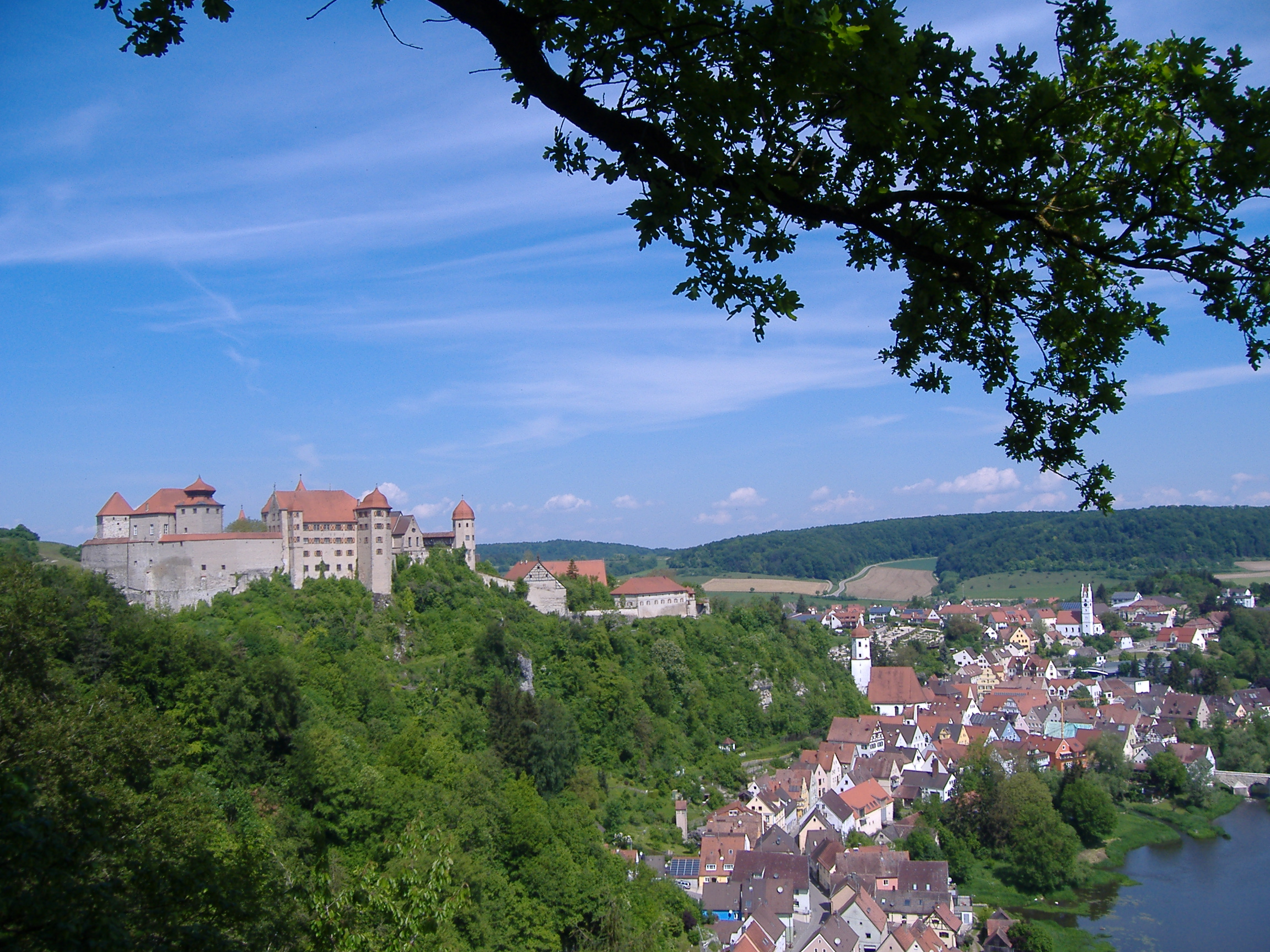
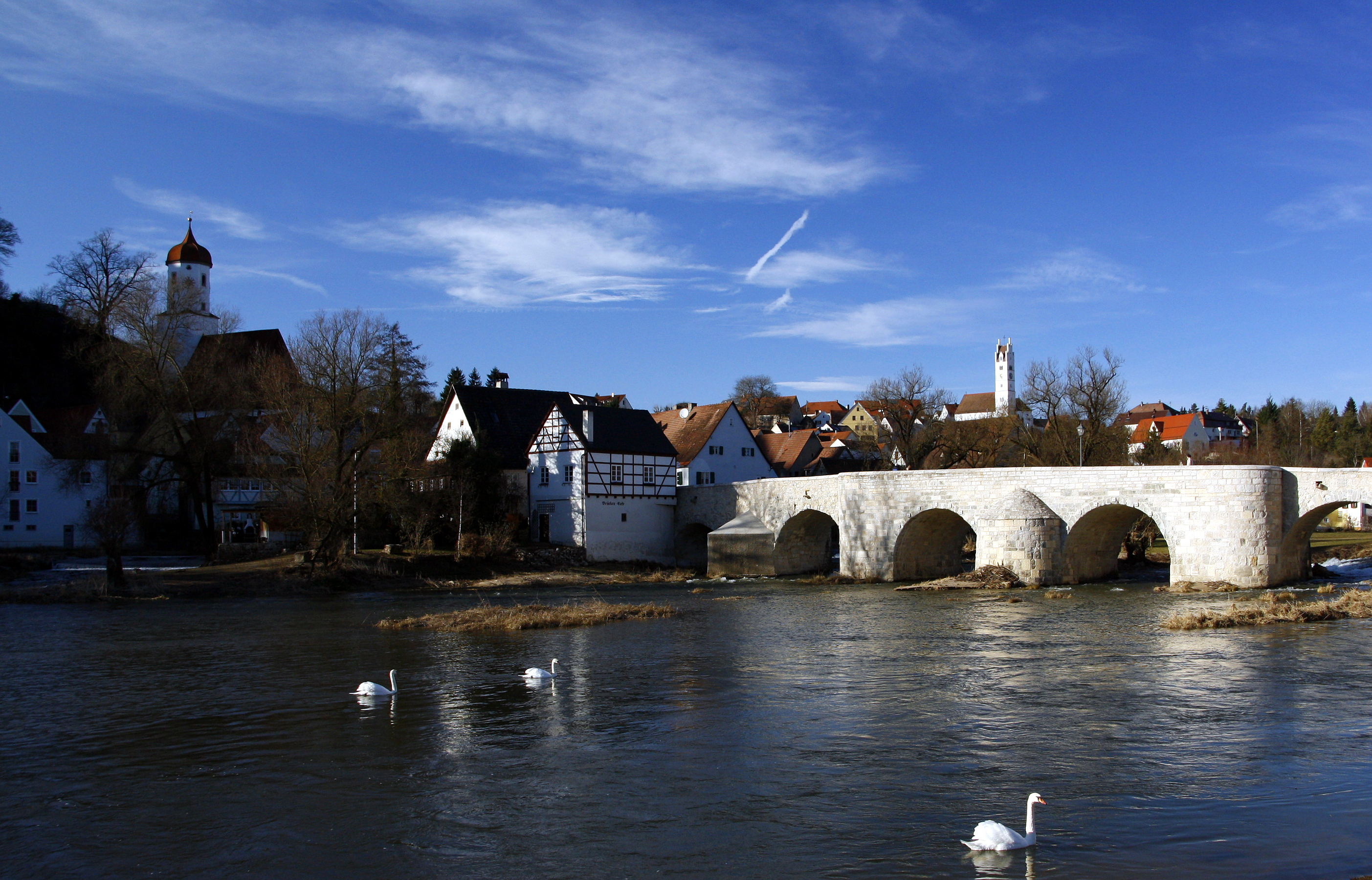
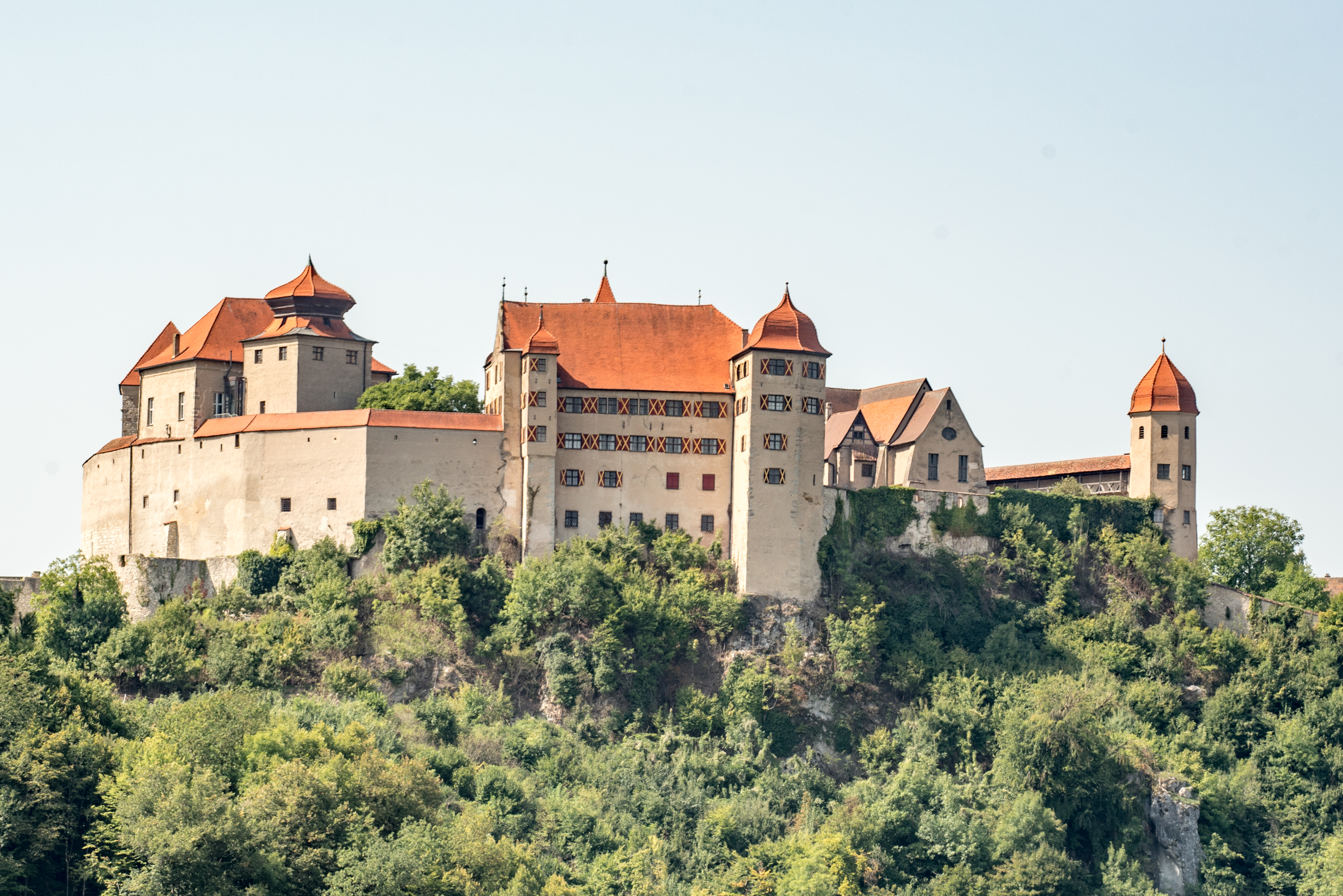
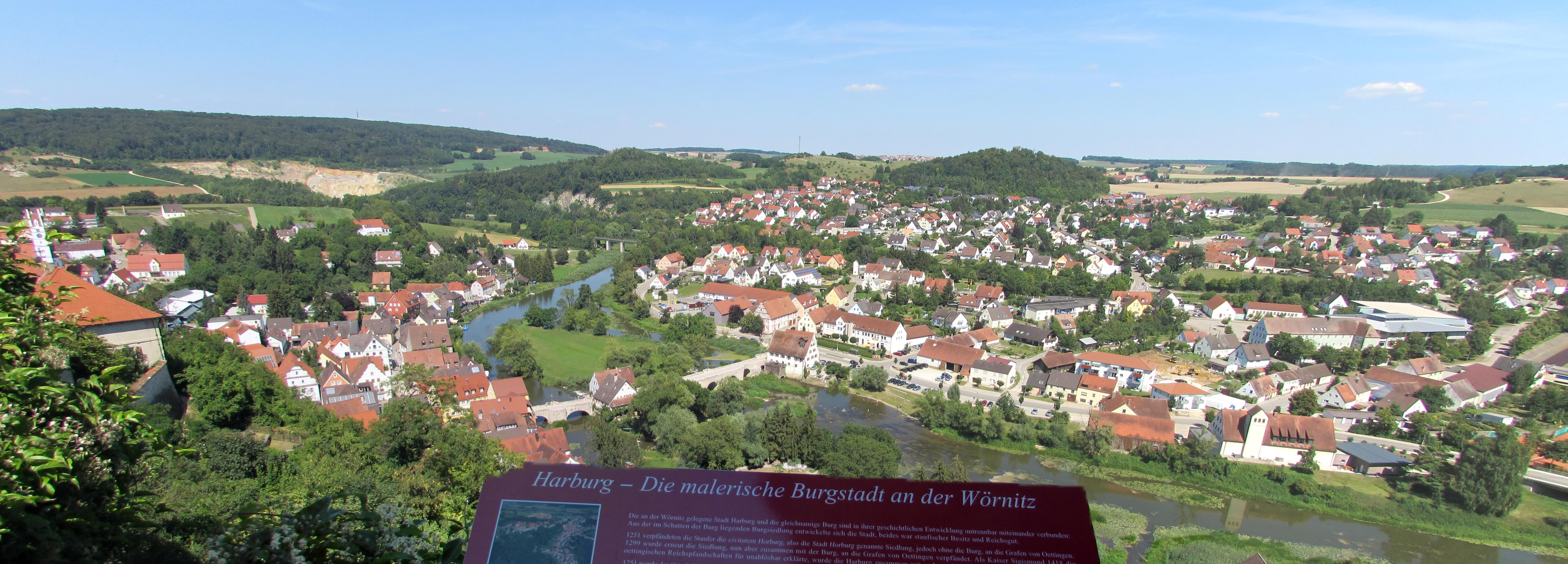
- From top: castle and town, old stone bridge with Wörnitz River and in the background St. Barbara and Herz Jesu, Harburg Castle, view from the castle on the town

- Flag Coat of arms

- Location of Harburg within Donau-Ries district
- Interactive map of Harburg
- Location within Germany Location within Bavaria
- Coordinates: 48°46′N 10°40′E
- Country: Germany
- State: Bavaria
- Admin. region: Swabia
- District: Donau-Ries

Government
  - Mayor (2020–26): Christoph Schmidt (Ind.)

Area
  - Total: 73.16 km^{2} (28.25 sq mi)
- Elevation: 413 m (1,355 ft)

Population (2025-12-31)
  - Total: 5,543
  - Density: 75.77/km^{2} (196.2/sq mi)
- Time zone: UTC+01:00 (CET)
  - Summer (DST): UTC+02:00 (CEST)
- Postal codes: 86655
- Dialling codes: 09080
- Vehicle registration: DON
- Website: www.stadt-harburg-schwaben.de

Harburg (German pronunciation: [ˈhaːɐ̯bʊʁk]; Alemannic German: Horburg or Horre) is a town in the Donau-Ries district, in Swabia, Bavaria, Germany. It is situated on the river Wörnitz and on the southeastern edge of the Ries meteorite crater in the UNESCO Global Geopark Ries.

The town is part of the scenic route called "Romantische Straße" (Romantic Road) with one of the most impressive remaining medieval castles in Germany.

== History ==
=== Etymology ===
The name of the town is usually interpreted as deriving from the Middle High German term horo, meaning "Swamp or bog". Harburg Castle would be a castle above the swamp. However, the soil conditions in Harburg speak against this thesis. In the local dialect Harburg is still referred to as Hore. This could be the German word for horn, which indicates the shape of the castle hill. Harburg Castle would thus be a castle on a hill with a horn shape.

=== Middle Ages ===
In 1093 the name Harburg appears for the first time by Mathilde de Horeburc, the wife of Count Kuno of Lechsgünd. In the Staufian period, the castle Harburg belonged together with the settlement to the Reichsgut. As early as 1250, the town received market rights, but the following year it was pledged by King Konrad IV to Count Ludwig III of Oettingen. A further pledge of the castle and town took place in 1299 by King Albrecht I to Count Ludwig V of Oettingen. The Imperial Eagle appeared as coat of arms for the first time in 1290. In 1418, the town and castle finally came into the possession of the Counts of Oettingen, who used it as a residence under Count Wolfgang I (1455-1522) and his son Karl Wolfgang (1484-1549).

== Main sights ==
=== Harburg Castle ===
Harburg Castle, which stands on a crag overlooking the town, is the landmark of Harburg. It is an extensive medieval complex from the 11th and 12th centuries and the condition of the 18th century has largely been preserved. Harburg Castle was first mentioned in 1150 by the Staufer Henry Berengar as an imperial castle. During the history it has never been seriously damaged by war. Unlike many other German castles which were built in the last 200 years or rebuilt after World War II, Harburg Castle retains the feel of the Middle Ages. Today the castle belongs to the Prince of Oettingen-Wallerstein Cultural Foundation. It offers daily guided tours through the castle from mid-March to the end of October. By foot you can reach the castle from the old town via various signposted paths around the castle hill.

=== Old town ===
The village itself is quaint with his medieval old town, which blends picturesquely between the Wörnitz River and the castle hill.

The historic stone bridge from the 18th century is also worth seeing. The arched structure was built in 1729 after a devastating flood, consisting of stone blocks with seven bays and covered pillars. Suevit was also used as building material. In order to finance the maintenance of the bridge, the municipality has always had the right in the past to levy a bridge and pavement toll. At the end of World War II in 1945, two arches of the bridge were destroyed by explosions. The damage was completely repaired after the end of the war by a slight widening at this position.

Reached from the stony bridge, we get to the old town and the market square with a bronze fountain, which tells a lot about the history of Harburg:

- The lower basin symbolizes with the guild signs of blacksmith, flaxbreaker, barrel-binder, fishermen and shoemaker the crafts that were formerly common in Harburg.
- The central basin shows different chapters from the city's history. There are also various figures from the mythical world of Harburg.
- The upper basin shows the silhouette of the castle and important historical data. The fountain closes with the “blood bell”, which is in the original on the roof of the town hall. By ringing the bell, the pronounced death sentence was announced in the past.

A further main sight would be the information point of the Geopark Ries, which is located since 2020 in the Donauwörher Street. This provides information about the formation of the giant Ries crater, the geology that resulted from it, and an overview of the town's history and points of interestes.

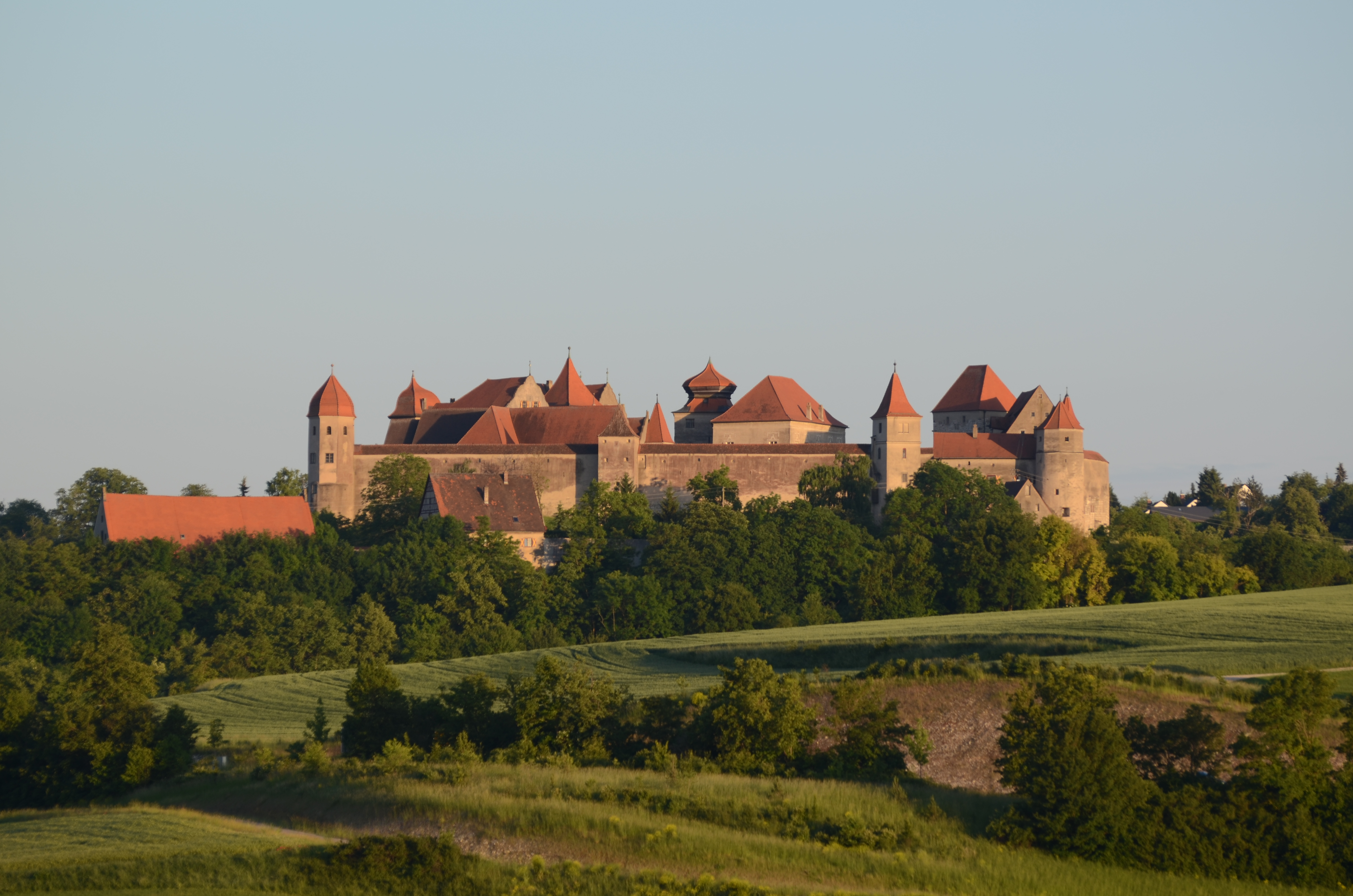
Harburg Castle

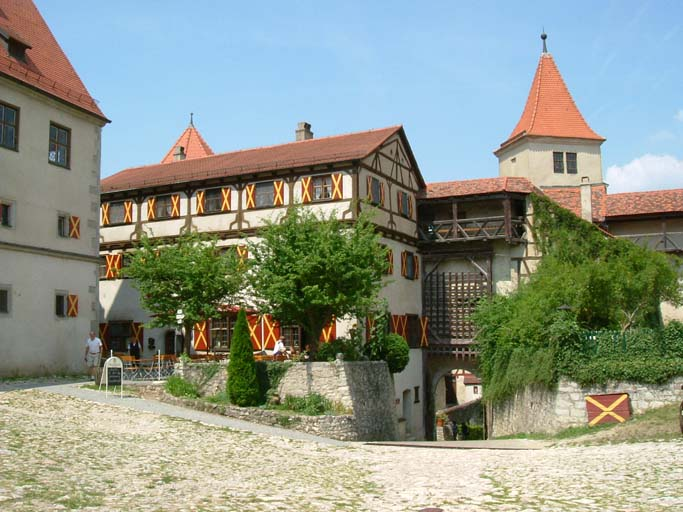
Harburg Castle entrance

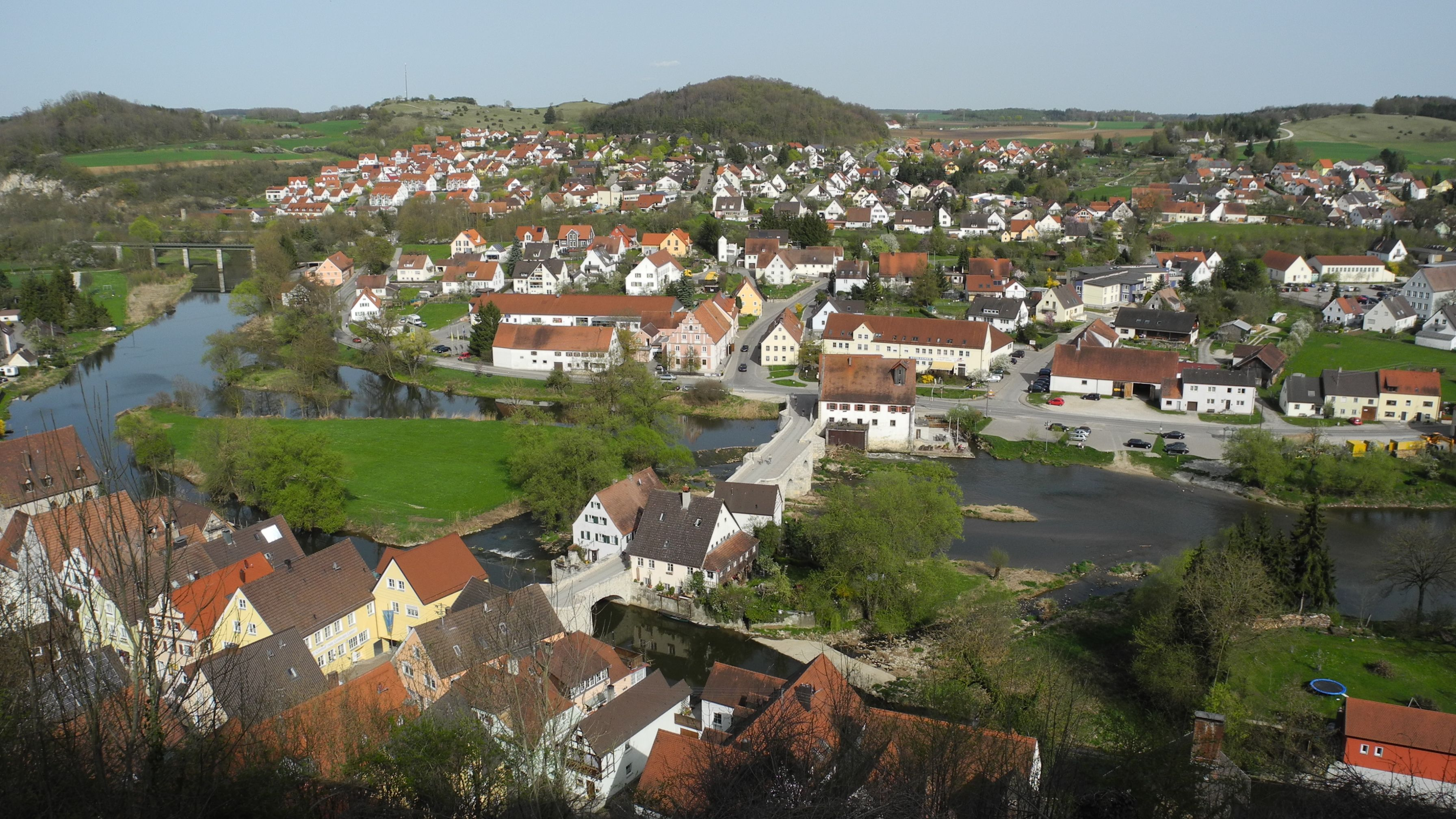
Harburg (view from Harburg Castle)

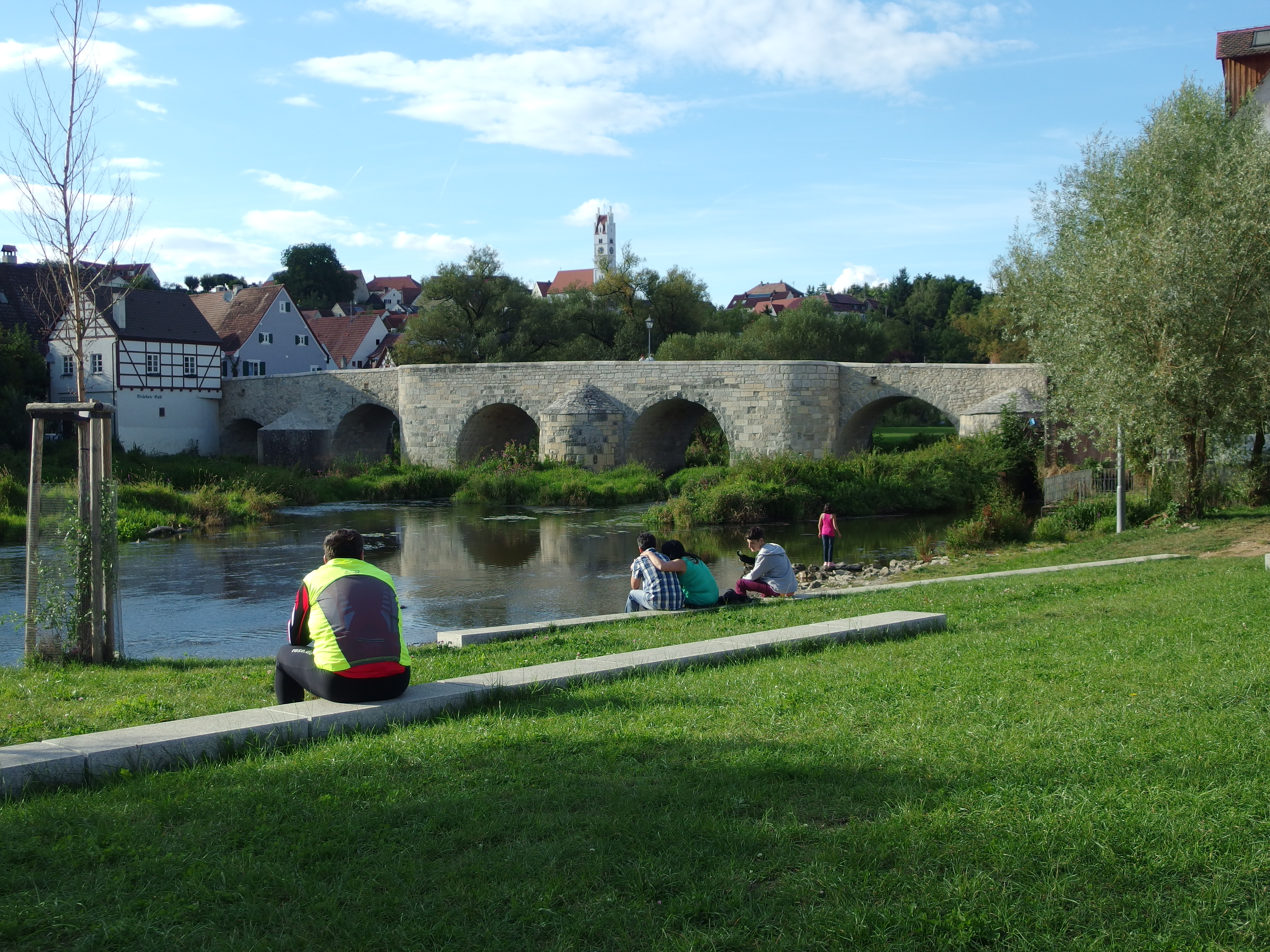
old stone bridge

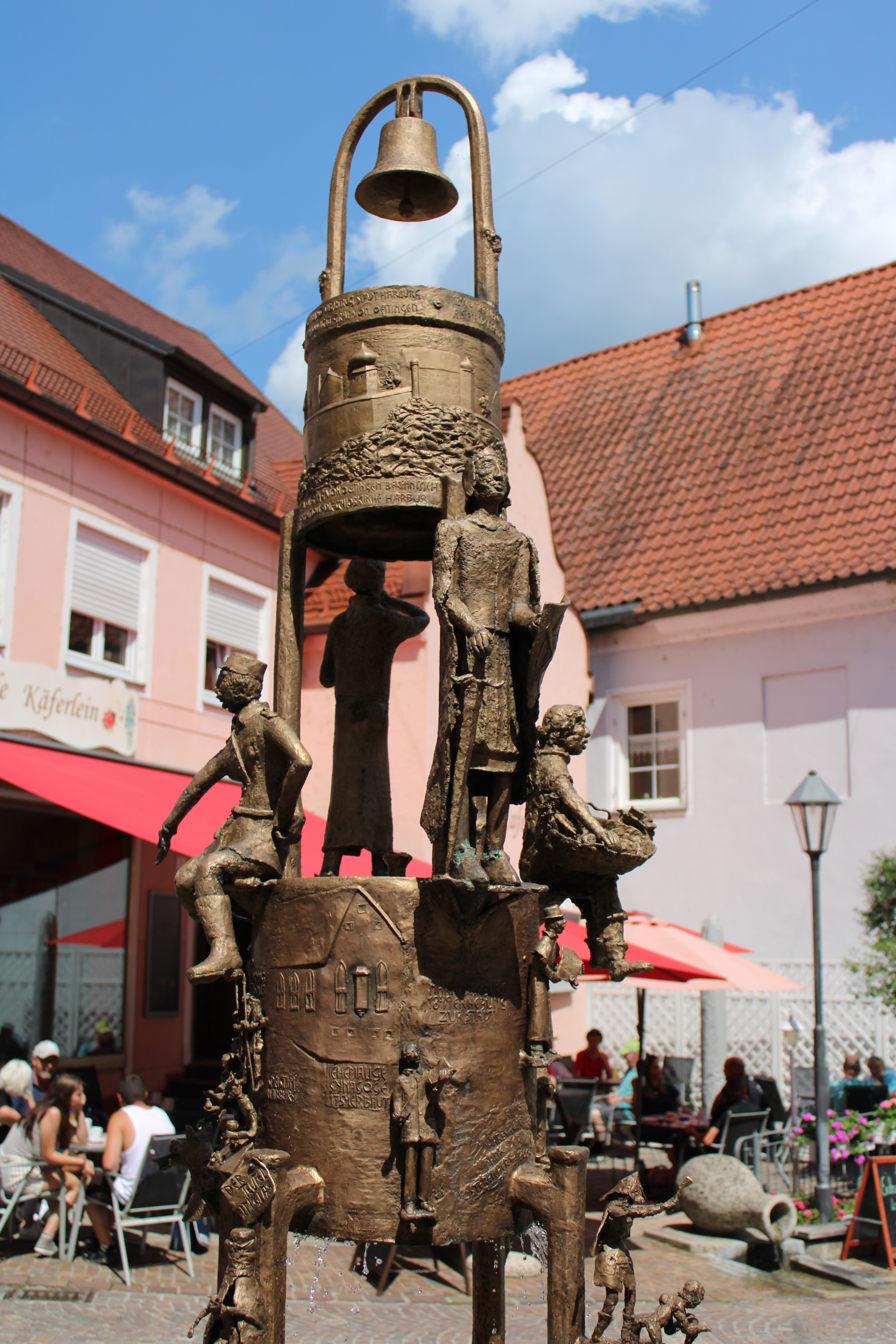
fountain

== Incorporated villages ==
Incorporated villages and districts are:

- Brünsee
- Ebermergen
- Großsorheim
- Harburg (with Birkenhof, Bühlhof, Harthof, Kratzhof, Listhof, Salchhof, and Stadelhof)
- Heroldingen (with Brennhof and Tiefenmühle),
- Hoppingen
- Mauren (with Obere Reismühle and Spielberg)
- Mündling (with Mündling Bahnhof and Olachmühle)
- Ronheim (with Katzenstein and Sonderhof)
- Schrattenhofen

== Mayors ==
List of Harburg mayors since 1972
Name	Party	Term of office
Adolf Härtl	SPD	1972–1976
Hans Schneider	CSU	1976–1984
Anton Fischer	SPD	1984–2002
Wolfgang Kilian	CSU	2002–2020
Christoph Schmidt	independent	since 2020

== Twin towns – sister cities ==
Harburg is twinned since 1998 with:

- Gouville sur Mer, France

== Economy ==
Important companies in Harburg are:

- Märker Group – cement fabric
- HPC AG – engineering company

Harburg has a station on the Augsburg–Nördlingen railway, which is served hourly on weekdays.
