= Forellenbach (Weser) =

River in Germany

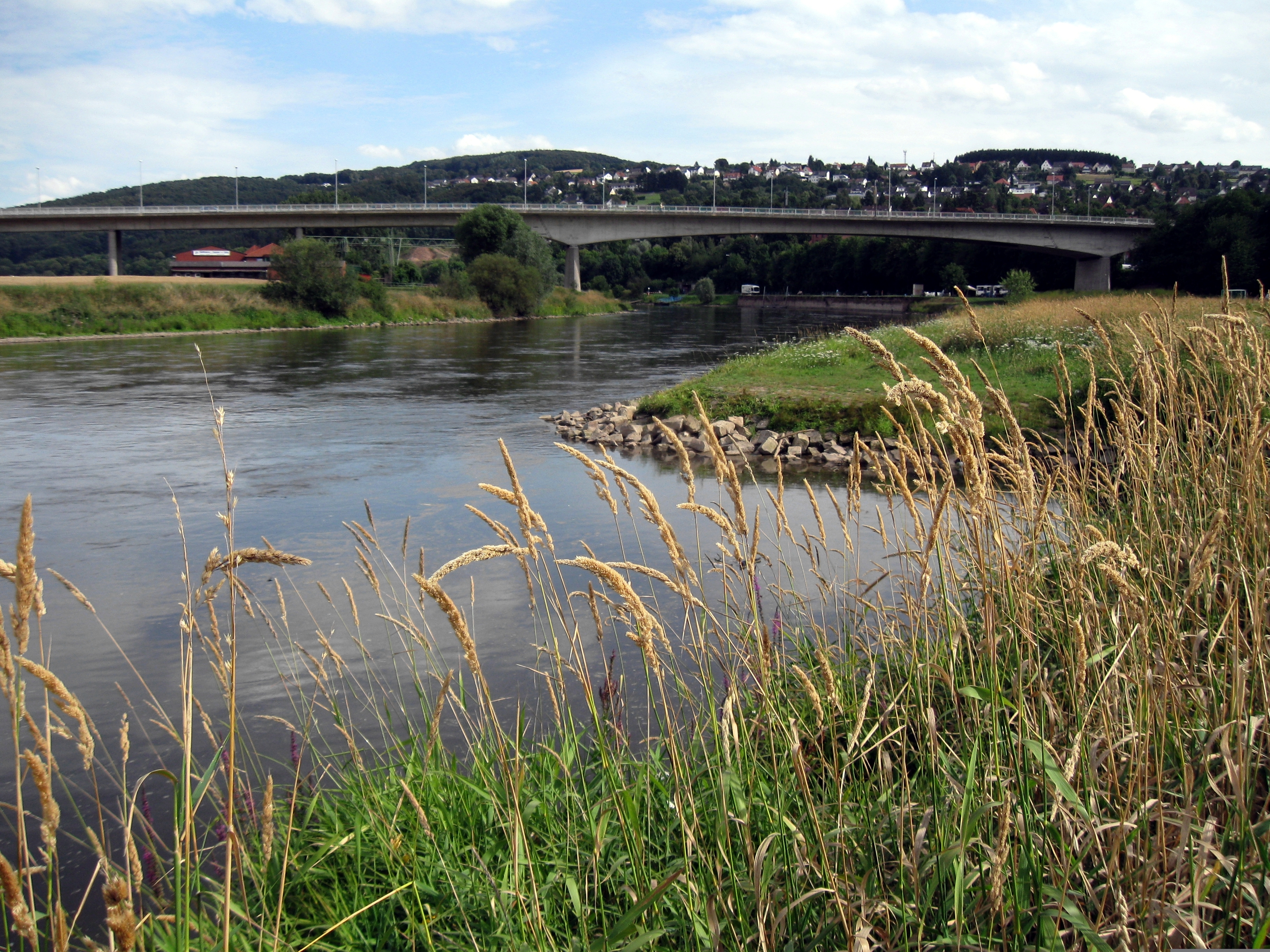

Location
- Country: Germany
- State: North Rhine-Westphalia

Physical characteristics
- Mouth
  - location: Weser
  - coordinates: 52.1716°N 8.8657°E
- Length: 11.3 km (7.0 mi)

Basin features
- Progression: Weser→ North Sea

Forellenbach is a river of North Rhine-Westphalia, Germany. It flows into the Weser in Vlotho.

== See also ==
- List of rivers of North Rhine-Westphalia
