= Wörnitz (river) =

River in Germany

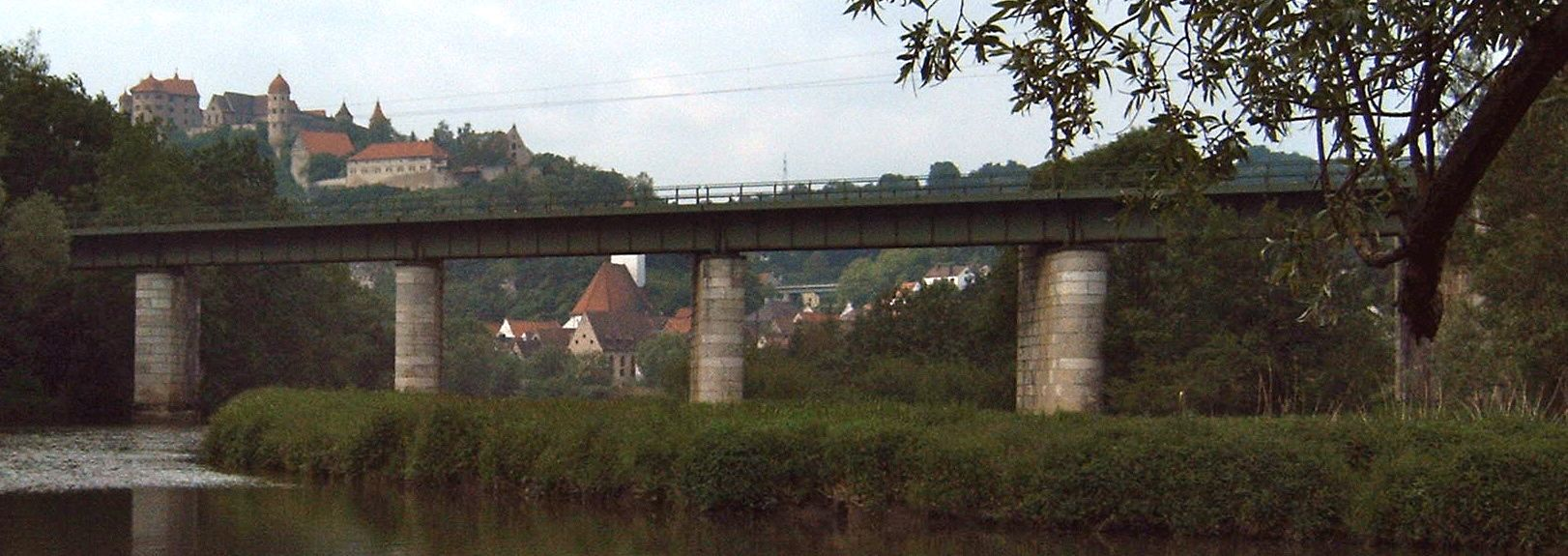
- Bridge over the Wörnitz near Harburg

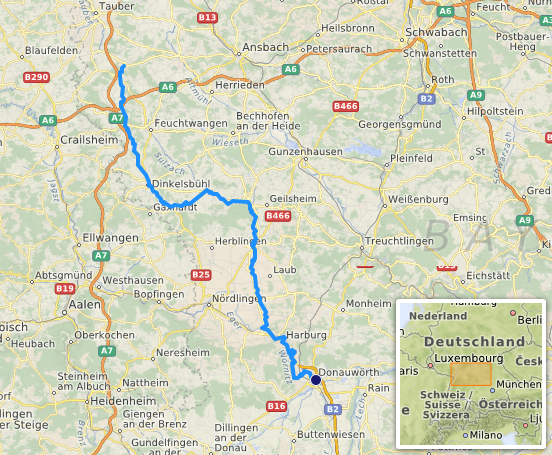

Location
- Country: Germany
- State: Bavaria

Physical characteristics
- Source
  - location: Middle Franconia
- Mouth
  - location: Danube
  - coordinates: 48°42′57″N 10°47′1″E
- Length: 131.8 km (81.9 mi)
- Basin size: 1,686 km^{2} (651 sq mi)

Basin features
- Progression: Danube→ Black Sea

The Wörnitz (German pronunciation: [ˈvœʁnɪts]) is a river in Bavaria, Germany, a left tributary of the Danube. Its source is near Schillingsfürst, in the Middle Franconia region of Bavaria. It flows south, through the Nördlinger Ries, and flows into the Danube in Donauwörth. Towns along the Wörnitz include Wörnitz, Dinkelsbühl, Wassertrüdingen, Oettingen, Harburg and Donauwörth.

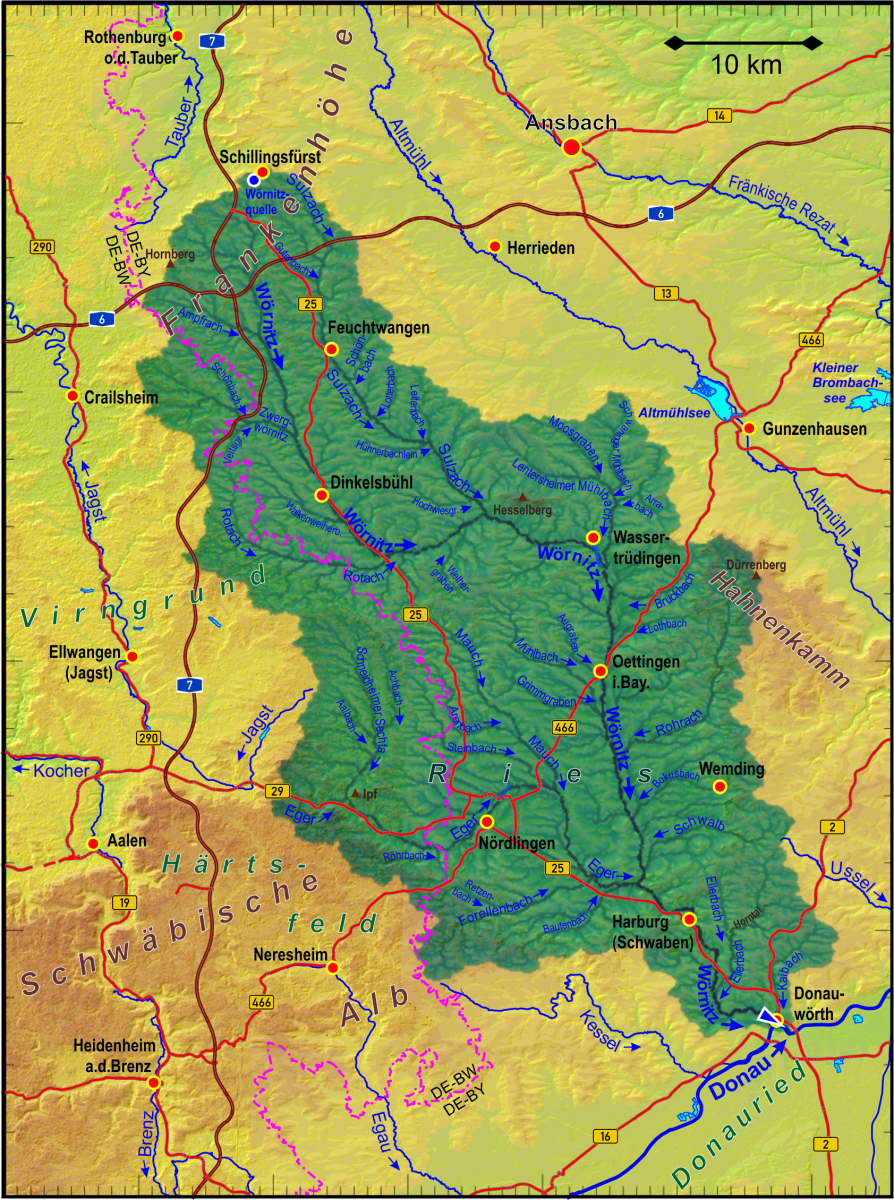
Catchment of the Wörnitz

== See also ==
- List of rivers of Bavaria
