= Hainsfarth =

- Municipality
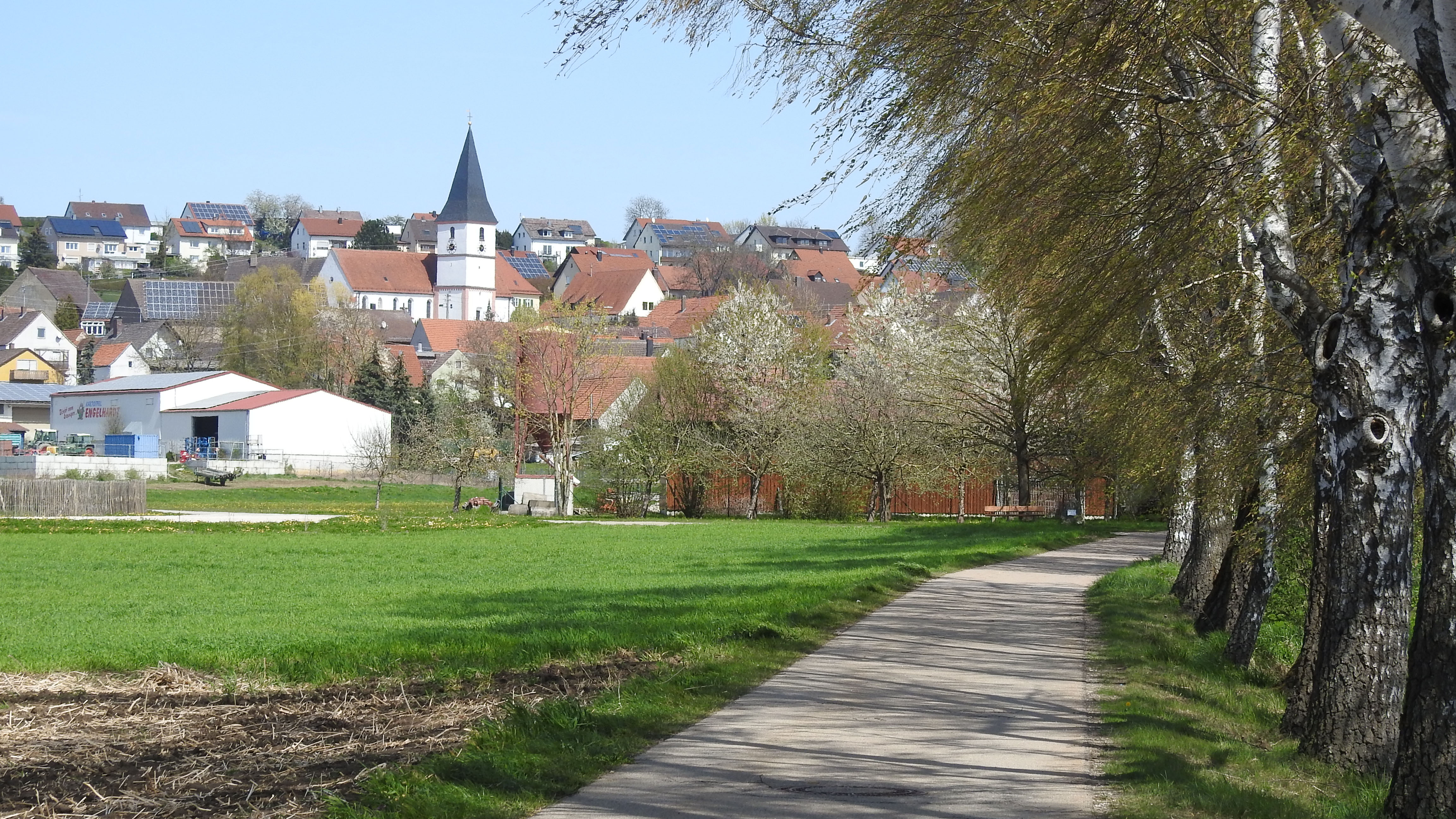
- Hainsfarth seen from the south

- Coat of arms

- Location of Hainsfarth within Donau-Ries district
- Interactive map of Hainsfarth
- Location within Germany Location within Bavaria
- Coordinates: 48°58′N 10°37′E
- Country: Germany
- State: Bavaria
- Admin. region: Schwaben
- District: Donau-Ries
- Municipal assoc.: Oettingen in Bayern

Government
  - Mayor (2019–25): Klaus Engelhardt

Area
  - Total: 17.55 km^{2} (6.78 sq mi)
- Elevation: 445 m (1,460 ft)

Population (2025-12-31)
  - Total: 1,389
  - Density: 79.15/km^{2} (205.0/sq mi)
- Time zone: UTC+01:00 (CET)
  - Summer (DST): UTC+02:00 (CEST)
- Postal codes: 86744
- Dialling codes: 09082
- Vehicle registration: DON
- Website: www.hainsfarth.de

Hainsfarth (Swabian: Hoasfarth) is a municipality in the district of Donau-Ries in Bavaria in Germany.

From as early as the 13th century until 1941, Hainsfarth was home to a sometimes large Jewish community, accounting for up to 40 percent of the village's population in 1810. From 1710 to 1938 the village also had a functioning synagogue, which was partly destroyed by the Nazis but renovated and reopened in 1996. The village also has an intact Jewish cemetery, which was desecrated during the Nazi era but later restored.

== Jewish community ==
=== History ===
The oldest surviving record of Hainsfarth's Jewish history dates back to 1434, when the burial of a Jew from the village at the Jewish cemetery at Nördlingen was recorded. By 1480, four Jewish households are mentioned at Hainsfarth. In the late 16th century, this number may have fallen as low as three Jewish citizens living in the village, but it soon rose again to between seven and ten households. From 1741, Jews were arriving in Hainsfarth from Palatinate-Neuburg, where they had been evicted.

The Jewish community did not have its own rabbi but was looked after by the rabbi of either Oettingen or Schwabach, at the end of the 19th century primarily the latter. The community was concentrated along the Judengasse, now the Jurastraße.

By 1810 the village had a population of 1,142, of whom 452 were Jewish, almost 40 percent. After that, the number and percentage of Jews in Hainsfarth steadily declined. In 1871, when Bavaria became part of the German Empire, there were still 232 Jews in the village, but by 1910 there were only 91.

Despite its decline, the community provided a selection of services to its members. Hainsfarth had a synagogue, a Jewish cemetery, a ritual bath and a religious school with a full-time teacher.

During the First World War the community lost three of its members, who were killed in action while serving in the German Army, with their names preserved on the local war memorial for the dead of the two World Wars.

When the Nazis came to power in 1933, Hainsfarth still had 34 members of the Jewish community living there. Some of them moved away or emigrated to escape the growing antisemitism but, in 1939, there were still 24 Jews in the village, reduced to eleven by 1941. On 10 August 1942 the Gestapo deported the last ten Jews in Hainsfarth to Theresienstadt, but some were also taken to Piaski. Three more Jews may still have been retained in the village until 1943 as slave labour in a local quarry, but they too were eventually deported. Yad Vashem records at least 50 Jews formerly from Hainsfarth who were killed in the Nazi era. The Jewish community was not restored after the Second World War, with no Jews returning to the village.

=== Synagogue ===
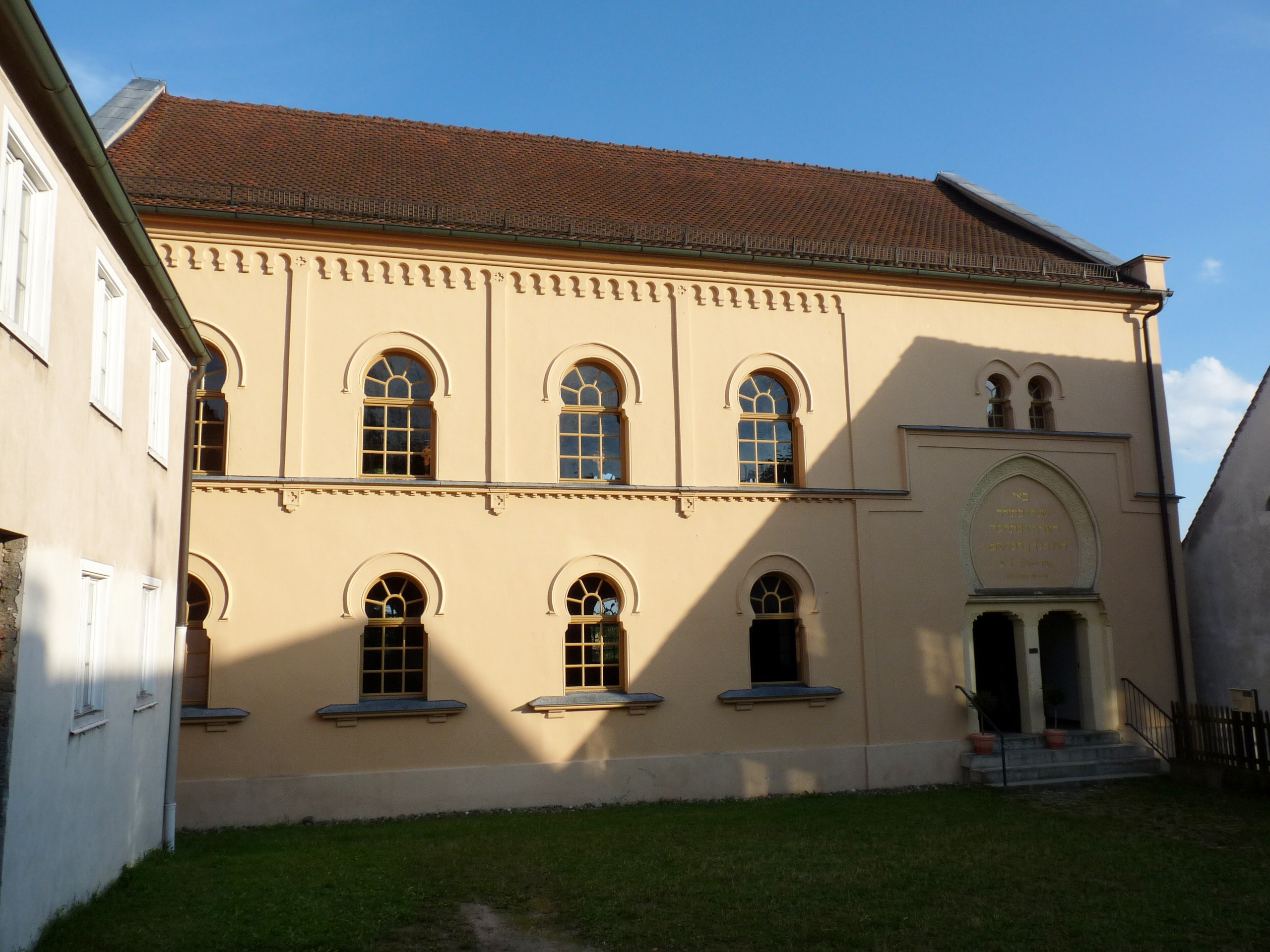
The Hainsfarth synagoge in 2010.

Originally the community would have only had a prayer room in one of the Jewish residences, but even before the Thirty Years War a Freihaus was established where the community was allowed to meet for religious services. In 1710 a synagogue was built on land owned by one of the Jewish residents. By 1857 this building was so derelict that a new one was required. The new synagogue was opened on 24 August 1860. It provided room for 108 men and 102 women.

The synagogue served until 1938, when it was desecrated during the Kristallnacht. After the Second World War the synagogue was confiscated by the US military and handed over to the Jewish Restitution Successor Organization (JSRO), which sold the school in 1952. The former synagogue became a sports hall, first in the possession of the municipality of Hainsfarth, later sold to the Protestant church. For a time there were plans to convert it into a church, but this was never done. In 1978 it was repurchased by the municipality and the first plans for a restoration were made. With the help of the state government of Bavaria the building was preserved, renovated and reopened in 1996. It now mainly serves as a venue for cultural events but is open for visitors.

=== Cemetery ===
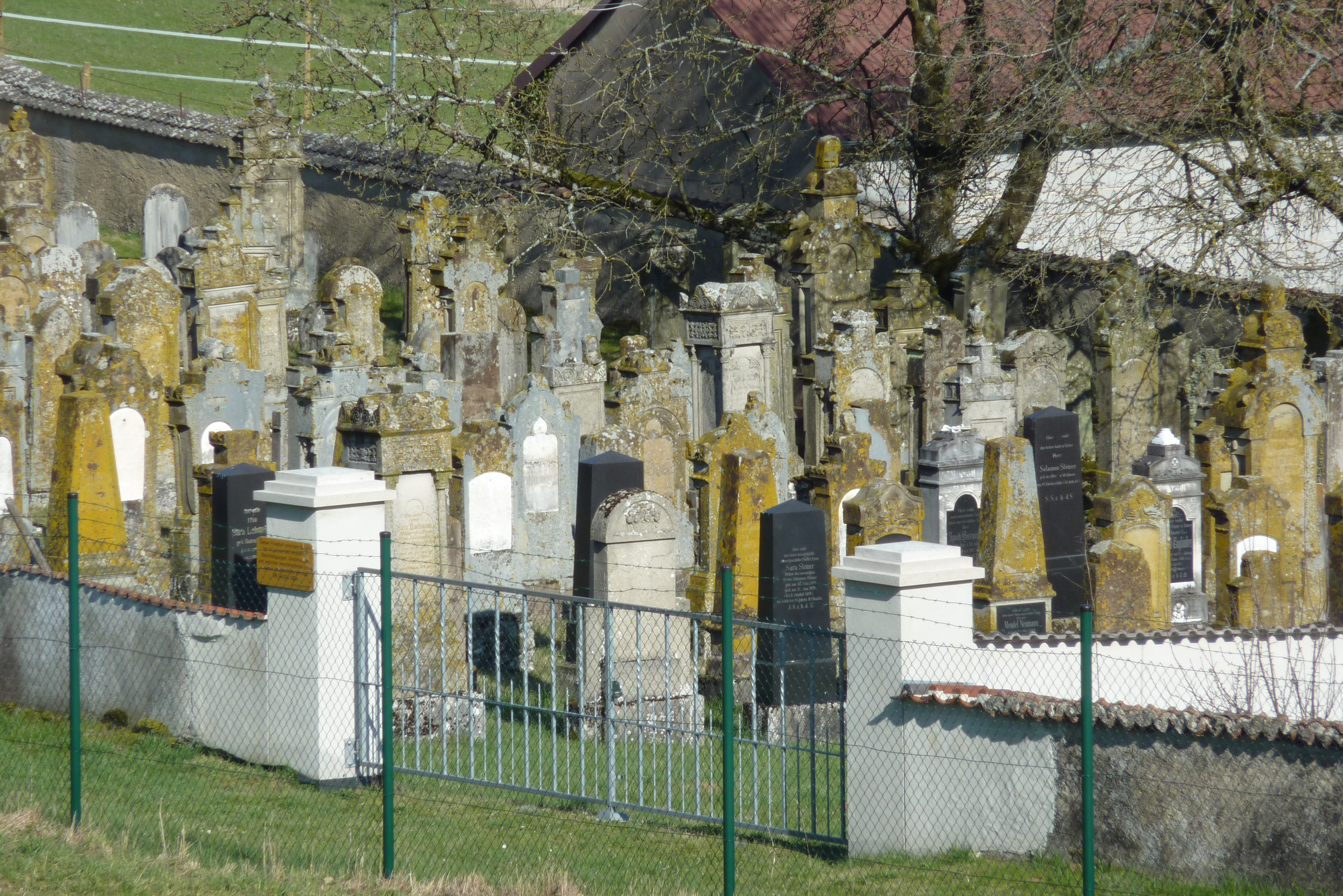
The Jewish cemetery in 2010.

The Jewish community in Hainsfarth originally buried their dead in the Jewish cemetery at Wallerstein. In 1836 the community started contemplating opening its own cemetery since a cholera epidemic in the region led to a temporary ban on transporting corpses. In 1849 the community purchased some land and in 1850 was granted the right to convert it into a cemetery. Altogether, 291 people were buried at the Hainsfarth Jewish cemetery.

In 1938, the cemetery was desecrated just like the synagogue, with the grave stones and buildings being partly destroyed. The cemetery was sold in 1943 but confiscated by the US military in 1945. It was handed over to the JSRO and renovations were carried out, partly paid for by the municipality of Hainsfarth. The cemetery is now in private possession with the stipulation that it is cared for.
