= County of Oettingen =

Noble Franconian and Swabian family

County (Principality) of Oettingen Grafschaft (Fürstentum) Oettingen
- 1147–1806
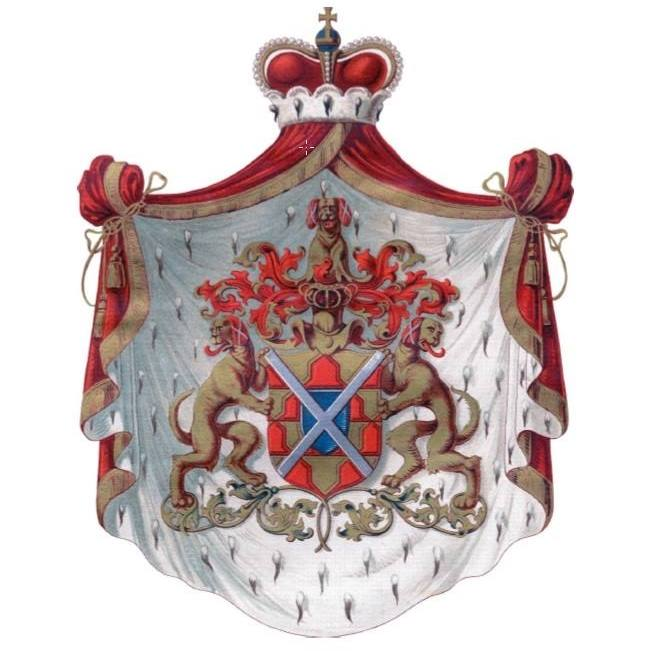
- Coat of arms

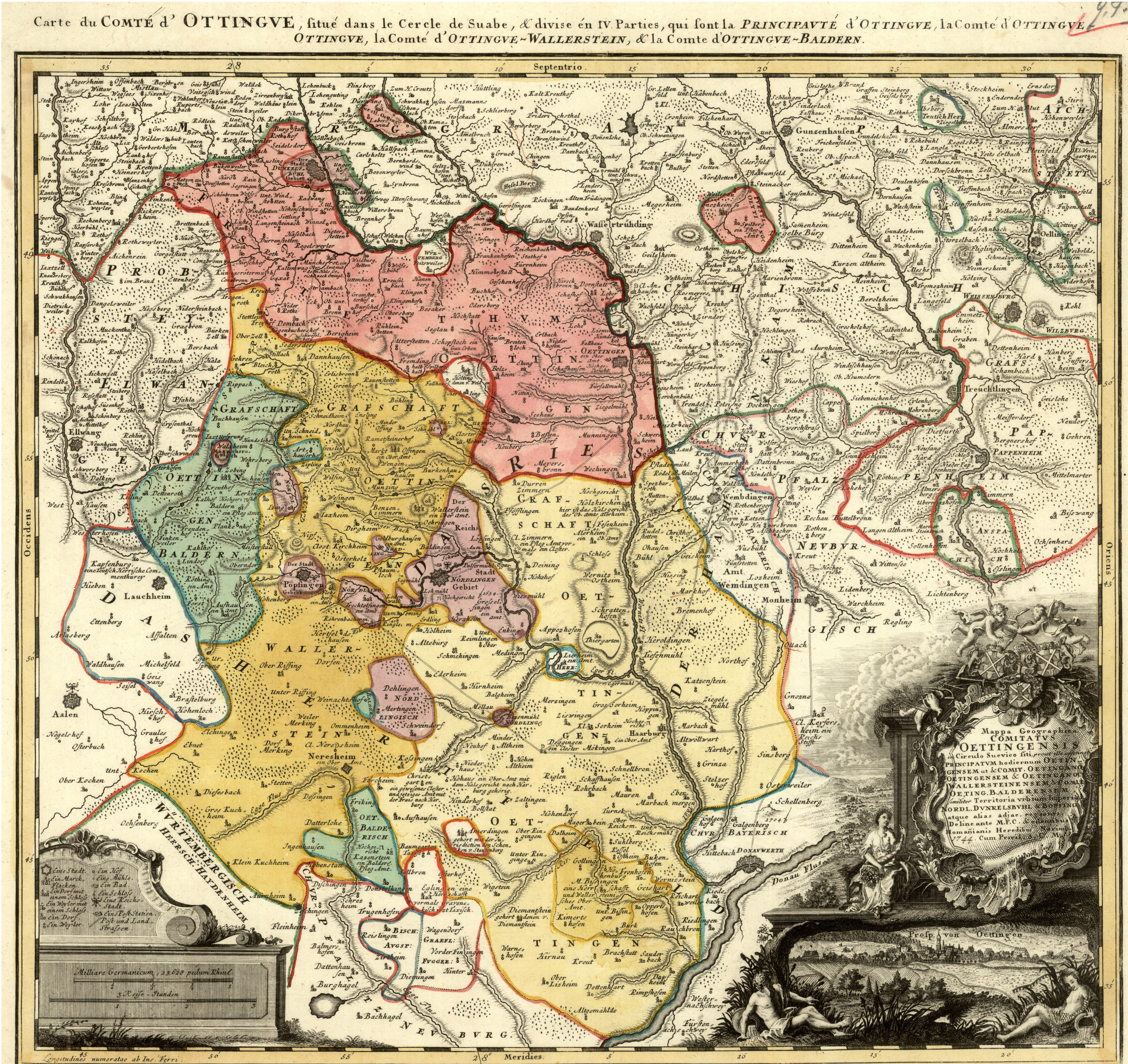
- 1744 map: Ö-Spielberg (north, pink); Ö-Oettingen (southeast, pale yellow); Ö-Wallerstein (midwest, yellow-orange); Ö-Baldern (west, blue-green).
- Status: State of the Holy Roman Empire
- Capital: Oettingen in Bayern
- Government: Principality
- Historical era: Middle Ages
  - First documentary mention: 1147
  - Partitioned: 1418, 1442 and 1485 1147
  - Partitioned to Ö-Oettingen and Ö-Wallerstein: 1522
  - Ö-Wallerstein partitioned to create Ö-Baldern and Ö-Spielberg: 1623/94
  - Ö-Oettingen extinct; to Ö-Spielberg and Ö-Wallerstein: 1731
  - Ö-Spielberg raised to principality: 1734
  - Ö-Wallerstein raised to principality: 1774
  - Ö-Baldern extinct; to Ö-Wallerstein: 1798
  - Mediatised to Bavaria: 1806
  - Partitioned with Württemberg: 1810
Preceded by	Succeeded by
Duchy of Swabia	Kingdom of Bavaria

The House of Oettingen was a high-ranking noble Franconian and Swabian family. It ruled various estates that composed the County of Oettingen between the 12th century and the beginning of the 19th century. In 1674 the house was raised to the rank of prince for the first time. Despite the annexation of their lands following the German mediatisation of 1806, the family retained their titles and still have representatives today.

== Origins ==
The Oettingen family traces its descent back to Fridericus comes, documented in 987, and his father Sieghard V. (Sigehardus comes in pago Riezzin, 'Sieghard, Count in Riesgau') from the Sieghardinger family, documented in 1007. These are also considered to be the ancestors of the Staufers.

The Oettingen family was first mentioned in 1147 with Ludovicus comes de Otingen, a relative of the Imperial House of Hohenstaufen who was granted the county surrounding the Imperial city of Nördlingen as a fief, possibly with his brother Chuno comes de Othingen. The relationship between the family and the Hohenstaufens is also proven by documents. The family built Steinsberg Castle around 1200 as vassals of the Hohenstaufen dynasty

From the 12th to the 14th century the family gained the largest secular territory in East Swabia. The county of Oettingen lay around the imperial city of Nördlingen in present-day Bavaria or Baden-Württemberg. At the end of the Old Kingdom in 1806, the area covered around 850 km^{2} (330 sq mi) and had around 60,000 inhabitants.

== Main branches ==
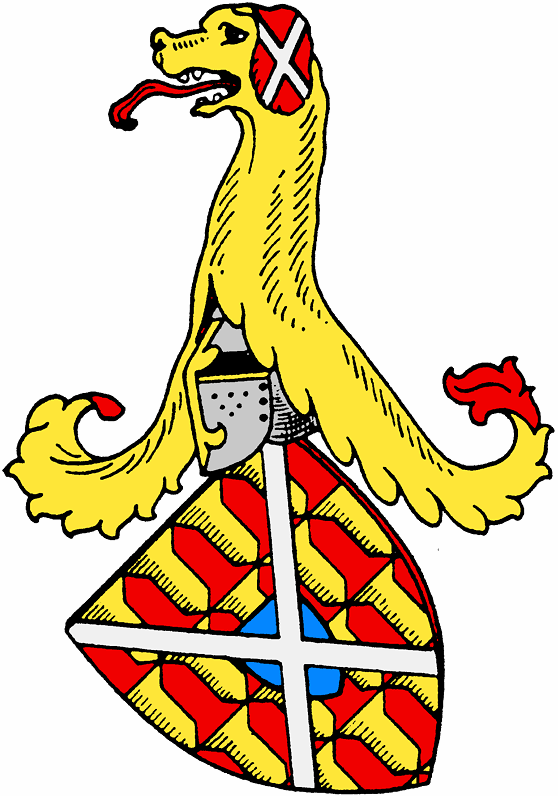
Arms of the House of Oettingen

Arms of the House of Oettingen-Wallerstein

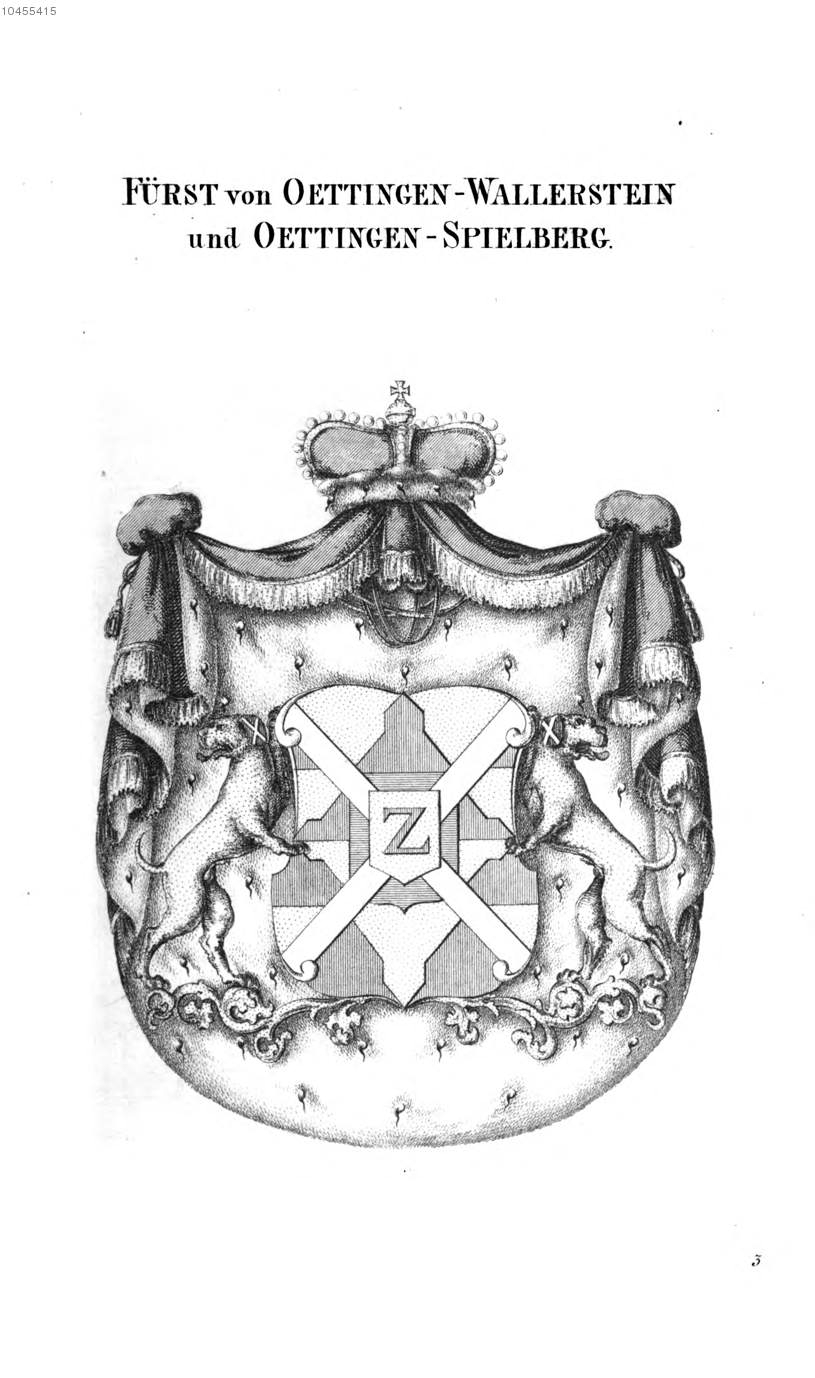
Princely arms of the family

From 1410, the county started its first divisions within the family, as noted below. Following the partitions, the remaining land was called Oettingen-Oettingen and was located in modern-day eastern Baden-Württemberg and western Bavaria. This branch was Protestant, created Prince of the Holy Roman Empire in 1674 but became extinct in 1731, when the county was divided and inherited by Oettingen-Spielberg (Princes since 1734) that obtained the town and castle of Oettingen, and Oettingen-Wallerstein (Princes since 1774).

=== Wallerstein ===
Oettingen-Wallerstein (German: Öttingen-Wallerstein) is a noble family related to a former County in modern-day eastern Baden-Württemberg and western Bavaria, Germany.

Oettingen-Wallerstein was twice created; first, as a partition of Oettingen (modern-day town of Oettingen in Bayern) in 1423 which became extinct in 1486 and was inherited by Oettingen-Oettingen, and the second time as a partition of Oettingen-Oettingen in 1557, as a Catholic branch of the family. Oettingen-Oettingen suffered one partition, between itself and Oettingen-Spielberg in 1602. It was raised to a Principality in 1774 by Joseph II, Holy Roman Emperor. In 1806, it was mediatised to the Kingdom of Bavaria, and divided with the Kingdom of Württemberg in 1810. At this time, the Principality had a territory of 850 km^{2} (330 sq mi) with 60,000 inhabitants.

=== Spielberg ===
Oettingen-Spielberg is a noble family and former principality in modern-day eastern Baden-Württemberg and western Bavaria, Germany. It was partitioned of Oettingen-Wallerstein in 1602. It was raised to a Principality in 1734 (after it inherited the town and the castle of Oettingen in 1731), mediatised to the Kingdom of Bavaria in 1806, and divided with the Kingdom of Württemberg in 1810. The other still-existing branch of the Oettingen family is the House of Oettingen-Wallerstein.

=== Baldern ===
Oettingen-Baldern was a line of the Swabian-Franconian noble house of Oettingen. It was created by dividing the Oettingen-Alt-Wallerstein line in 1623. The Counts of Oettingen-Baldern died out in 1789. The possessions including Baldern Castle and Katzenstein Castle as well as the Sötern lordship went over to the Oettingen-Wallerstein line.

== Rulers ==
=== House of Oettingen ===
Partitions of Oettingen under Oettingen rule

County of Oettingen (1147-1674)	County of Wallerstein (1st creation) (1423-1486)	County of Flochberg (1423-1549)
Raised to Principality of Oettingen (1674-1731)
County of Wallerstein (2nd creation) (1557-1774)	County of Baldern (1602-1687)	County of Spielberg (1579-1734) Raised to Principality of Spielberg (1734-1806)
County of Katzenstein (1626-1787)
Raised to Principality of Wallerstein (1774-1806)
Mediatised to the Kingdom of Bavaria (from 1806)

Table of rulers

Like the Reuss family and the House of Schwarzburg, the Oettingen Family also has the tradition of numbering members of the family by order of birth, independently of having ruled or not. As so, the table below will present the birth numbering in comma "", followed, in brackets (), by the counting of those who actually ruled. Despite the more known divisions having begun only in the 15th century, it is clear (or at least hints to), by the simultaneous use of the title Comes Ötingen by various rulers at the same time, that the period 1141-1440 was also marked by various, but short-lived divisions between the counts. The un-definition of the concrete limits of the counts' possessions contributed to this as well. Therefore, in the referred period, it is unknown, in this early divisions of the land, which branch kept which part. As so, the divisions will be called, at this early stage of the history of the counts of Oettingen, as Part A, Part B and so on.

Ruler	Born	Reign	Ruling part	Consort	Death	Notes
Louis I	c.1110 ?	1147 – 1160	County of Oettingen	Unknown five children	c.1160? aged 49-50?	Brothers and founders of the family and the county, title given to them in 1147. They were five brothers in total of unknown parentage. Besides Louis and Conrad, there was a Hartwig, an unnamed son and an unnamed daughter who was the mother of a documented lady named Gisala de Seevelt
Conrad I	c.1110 ?	1147 – 1160	County of Oettingen	Unknown	c.1160? aged 49-50?	Brothers and founders of the family and the county, title given to them in 1147. They were five brothers in total of unknown parentage. Besides Louis and Conrad, there was a Hartwig, an unnamed son and an unnamed daughter who was the mother of a documented lady named Gisala de Seevelt
Louis II	c.1145 Son of Louis I	1160 – 28 June 1225	County of Oettingen	Sophia of Lechsgmünd (d.1242/43) four children	28 June 1225 aged 84-85?	
Louis III the Elder	1217; Oettingen; First son of Louis II and Sophia of Lechsgmünd	28 June 1225 – April 1279	County of Oettingen (Part A)	Margaret of Burgau-Berg-Schelklingen (d.c.1245); 28 June 1241 two children Udelhild of Hirschberg (c.1230-c.1310); 1246/53 two children	April 1279; Oettingen aged 61-62	Children of Louis II, divided their inheritance, despite their holdings being unclear. They shared the title of comes which they passed to their respective children. Conrad "IV" (III) predeceased his father, but it is known he ruled an area inherited through his wife.
Conrad "III" (II)	c.1220 Second son of Louis II and Sophia of Lechsgmünd	28 June 1225 – 28 June 1241	County of Oettingen (Part B)	Elisabeth of Württemberg (d.1251) one child	28 June 1241 aged 20-21	Children of Louis II, divided their inheritance, despite their holdings being unclear. They shared the title of comes which they passed to their respective children. Conrad "IV" (III) predeceased his father, but it is known he ruled an area inherited through his wife.
Conrad "IV" (III)	c.1245 Son of Louis III and Margaret of Burgau-Berg-Schelklingen	c.1267 – February 1279	County of Oettingen (Part C)	Agnes of Württemberg I April/May 1275 four children	February 1279 aged 33-34	Children of Louis II, divided their inheritance, despite their holdings being unclear. They shared the title of comes which they passed to their respective children. Conrad "IV" (III) predeceased his father, but it is known he ruled an area inherited through his wife.
Regency of Elisabeth of Württemberg (1241-1251)						Ruled under regency and possibly died still a minor. His part rejoined the main Oettingen part.
Louis IV	c.1240 Son of Conrad "III" (II) and Elisabeth of Württemberg	28 June 1241 – 1251	County of Oettingen (Part B)	? of Ortenburg (d.1231) no children	1251 aged 10-11	Ruled under regency and possibly died still a minor. His part rejoined the main Oettingen part.
Part B rejoined Part A
Regency of Agnes of Württemberg I (1279-1289)						Had issues with the Prince-Bishopric of Eichstätt, which led to an imperial ban in May 1310, which stripped him of his property.
Conrad "V" (IV) the Shrimp	c.1275 Son of Conrad "IV" (III) and Agnes of Württemberg I	February 1279 – May 1310	County of Oettingen (Part C)	Adelaide of Hohenlohe-Weikersheim c.1300? one child	13 September 1313 aged 37-38	Had issues with the Prince-Bishopric of Eichstätt, which led to an imperial ban in May 1310, which stripped him of his property.
Part C annexed to the Diocese of Eichstätt
Louis V	c.1255 Oettingen; Son of Louis III and Udelhild of Hirschberg	April 1279 – 9 November 1313	County of Oettingen (Part A)	Maria of Nuremberg; July 1263 seven children	9 November 1313; Oettingen aged 67-68	Co-ruling with his father and half-brother at least since 1267. He also used the same co-ruling method, associating at least his sons Frederick I (who eventually predeceased him) and Louis VI (shown below). In 1306, the mother of the co-rulers, Adelaide, received as widow seat, from the Diocese of Eichstätt, the fortress of Wellheim.
Frederick I	c.1265 First son of Louis V and Maria of Nuremberg	1311 – 3 March 1312	County of Oettingen (Part A)	Elisabeth of Dornberg (d.1309/11); 1270 four children	3 March 1312 aged 46-47	Co-ruling with his father and half-brother at least since 1267. He also used the same co-ruling method, associating at least his sons Frederick I (who eventually predeceased him) and Louis VI (shown below). In 1306, the mother of the co-rulers, Adelaide, received as widow seat, from the Diocese of Eichstätt, the fortress of Wellheim.
Udelhild of Hirschberg	c.1230 Daughter of Gebhard of Hirschberg	1306 – c.1310	County of Oettingen (Part A, at Wellheim)	Louis III; 1246/53 two children	c.1310 aged 79-80?	Co-ruling with his father and half-brother at least since 1267. He also used the same co-ruling method, associating at least his sons Frederick I (who eventually predeceased him) and Louis VI (shown below). In 1306, the mother of the co-rulers, Adelaide, received as widow seat, from the Diocese of Eichstätt, the fortress of Wellheim.
Louis VI	c.1270 Harburg; Second son of Louis V and Maria of Nuremberg	9 November 1313 – 29 September 1346	County of Oettingen (Part A)	Anna of Dornberg (d.5 April 1299); 1288 one child Agnes of Württemberg II c.1310 four children Judith of Austria; 26 April 1319; Baden no children	29 September 1346; Vienna aged 75-76	Co-ruling with his father Louis V at least since 1311, Louis VI divided his inheritance with his nephews, sons of Frederick I.
Louis "VIII" (VII)	c.1295 First son of Frederick I and Elisabeth of Dornberg	9 November 1313 – 26 July 1378	County of Oettingen (Part D)	Imagina of Isenburg-Limburg; 14 August 1332 no children Margaret of Hohenberg; 1343 one child Catherine of Katzenstein (d. 3 May 1374) no children	26 July 1378 aged 82-83?	Co-ruling with his father Louis V at least since 1311, Louis VI divided his inheritance with his nephews, sons of Frederick I.
Frederick II	1296; Oettingen; Second son of Frederick I and Elisabeth of Dornberg	9 November 1313 – 4 October 1357	County of Oettingen (Part E)	Adelaide of Werd (d.1358) c.1315 one child	4 October 1357; Oettingen aged 60-61	Co-ruling with his father Louis V at least since 1311, Louis VI divided his inheritance with his nephews, sons of Frederick I.
Part D annexed to part E
Albert	c.1310 Son of Louis VI and Agnes of Württemberg II	29 September 1346 – 11 February 1357	County of Oettingen (Part A)	Adelaide of Ortenburg; 1346/47 two children	11 February 1357 aged 46-47	
Part A annexed to part D, E or divided between both of them
Louis "X" (VIII)	c.1320 Son of Frederick II and Adelaide of Werd	4 October 1357 – 1 May 1370	County of Oettingen (Part E)	Imagina of Schaunberg; 1351 eight children	1 May 1370 aged 49-50	
Regency of Imagina of Schaunberg (1370-1374)						Children of Louis "X" (VIII), ruled jointly, and, in 1378, reunited the whole county.
Louis "XI" (IX) the Bearded	c.1360 First son of Louis "X" (VIII) and Imagina of Schaunberg	1 May 1370 – 28 October 1440	County of Oettingen (Part E) (until 1378) County of Oettingen (as a whole, from 1378)	Beatrice of Helfenstein (1365-1388); 15 December 1374 four children Agnes of Werdenberg (d.17 December 1474) c.1420 two children	28 October 1440 aged 79-80?	Children of Louis "X" (VIII), ruled jointly, and, in 1378, reunited the whole county.
Frederick III	c.1360 Second son of Louis "X" (VIII) and Imagina of Schaunberg	1 May 1370 – 23 January 1423	County of Oettingen (Part E) (until 1378) County of Oettingen (as a whole, from 1378)	Elisabetta da Carrara (d.1395); 24 March 1395 no children Euphemia, Duchess of Ziębice; 1397 nine children	23 January 1423 aged 63-64	Children of Louis "X" (VIII), ruled jointly, and, in 1378, reunited the whole county.
William I	c.1400 First son of Frederick III and Euphemia, Duchess of Ziębice	28 October 1440 – 13 April 1467	County of Oettingen	Beatrice della Scala (d.14 February 1466); 5 August 1447; Munich six children	13 April 1467 aged 66-67	Children of Frederick III, the brothers were possibly co-ruling with Louis "XI" (IX). In 1440, divided their inheritance.
John I the Solemn	1415; Second son of Frederick III and Euphemia, Duchess of Ziębice	2 October 1440 – 10 May 1449	County of Wallerstein	Margaret of Gorizia (d.8 January 1450); 1443 two children	10 May 1449 aged 33-34	Children of Frederick III, the brothers were possibly co-ruling with Louis "XI" (IX). In 1440, divided their inheritance.
Ulrich I	c.1415 Third son of Frederick III and Euphemia, Duchess of Ziębice	2 October 1440 – 28 May 1477	County of Flochberg	Elisabeth of Schaunberg (d.August 1461); 25 February 1444 one child Barbara von Kunstadt-Podebrady (1451-20 September 1474); 8 February 1466 two children Barbara of Tengen (d.1489); 13 August 1475 no children	28 May 1477 aged 61-62	Children of Frederick III, the brothers were possibly co-ruling with Louis "XI" (IX). In 1440, divided their inheritance.
Regency (1449-1454)						Left no descendants. After his death Wallerstein reverted to the main county of Oettingen
Louis "XIII" (X)	1440; Son of John I and Margaret of Gorizia	10 May 1449 – 21 March 1486	County of Wallerstein	Eva of Schwarzenberg-Hohenlandsberg (d.18 August 1473); 1467/73 one child Veronica of Waldburg-Sonnenburg (d.1517); 26 January 1478 no children	21 March 1486 aged 39-40	Left no descendants. After his death Wallerstein reverted to the main county of Oettingen
Wallerstein annexed to Oettingen
John II	c.1450 Second son of William I and Beatrice della Scala	13 April 1467 – 15 April 1519	County of Oettingen	Elisabeth de La Hamaide, Dame de Condé (d.29 April 1526) no children	15 April 1519 aged 68-69	Children of William I, ruled jointly.
Wolfgang I	16 May 1455; Third son of William I and Beatrice della Scala	13 April 1467 – 29 January 1522	County of Oettingen	Anna of Waldburg-Waldsee (d.26 March 1507); 1482 two children	29 January 1522; Harburg aged 66	Children of William I, ruled jointly.
Joachim	1470; Flochberg; Son of Ulrich I and Barbara von Kunstadt-Podebrady	28 May 1477 – 7 July 1520	County of Flochberg	Dorothea of Anhalt-Köthen (1472-3 August 1505); 28 May 1496 eight children	7 July 1520; Flochberg aged 49-50	
Martin	11 November 1500; First son of Joachim and Dorothea of Anhalt-Köthen	7 July 1520 – 18 August 1549	County of Flochberg	Anna of Leuchtenberg (31 May 1506 – 22 October 1555); 7 November 1522 one child	18 August 1549; Wallerstein aged 48	Children of Joachim, ruled jointly. After their deaths, their county was reabsorbed in Oettingen, as they left no male heirs.
Louis "XIV" (XI)	13 May 1502; Second son of Joachim and Dorothea of Anhalt-Köthen	7 July 1520 – 25 March 1548	County of Flochberg	Unmarried	25 March 1548 aged 45	Children of Joachim, ruled jointly. After their deaths, their county was reabsorbed in Oettingen, as they left no male heirs.
Charles Wolfgang	1474; First son of Wolfgang I and Anna of Waldburg-Zeil	29 January 1522 – 3 October 1549	County of Oettingen	Elisabeth of Leuchtenberg (1508-14 April 1560); 5 November 1524 five children	3 October 1549 aged 74-75	Children of Wolfgang I, ruled jointly.
Louis "XV" (XII)	26 April 1486; Second son of Wolfgang I and Anna of Waldburg-Zeil	29 January 1522 – 24 March 1557	County of Oettingen	Maria Salomea of Hohenzollern-Haigerloch; 15 March 1507; Rothenburg am Neckar six children	24 March 1557; Alerheim aged 70	Children of Wolfgang I, ruled jointly.
Euphemia	1523; Daughter of Martin and Anna of Leuchtenberg	18 August 1549 – 16 March 1560	County of Flochberg	Frederick "VI" (IV); 17 March 1542 seven children	16 March 1560 aged 36-37	Heiress of her father, she evenetually passed, through marriage, her inheritance to her Wallerstein cousins.
Flochberg annexed to Wallerstein
Louis "XVI" (XIII)	1 July 1508; Harburg; First son of Louis "XV" (XII) and Maria Salomea of Hohenzollern-Haigerloch	24 March 1557 – 1 October 1569	County of Oettingen	Margaret of Palatinate-Lützelstein (14 March 1523 – 3 July 1560); 11 September 1543; Oettingen in Bayern eleven children Susanna of Inner Mansfeld; 26/27 August 1562 two children Claudia of Hohenfels (d.1582); 1569 two children	1 October 1569; Harburg aged 61	Children of Louis "XV" (XII), divided their inheritance.
Wolfgang II	1511; Second son of Louis "XV" (XII) and Maria Salomea of Hohenzollern-Haigerloch	24 March 1557 – 1 March 1573	County of Oettingen	Margaret of Baden-Durlach (1519-16 April 1574); 12/17 November 1538 no children Ursula of Rosenfeld (d.1538) (morganatic) no children	1 March 1573; Flochberg aged 61-62	Children of Louis "XV" (XII), divided their inheritance.
Frederick "VI" (IV)	6 November 1516; Harburg; Third son of Louis "XV" (XII) and Maria Salomea of Hohenzollern-Haigerloch	24 March 1557 – 2 February 1579	County of Wallerstein	Euphemia of Oettingen-Flochberg (1523-16 March 1560); 17 March 1542 seven children	2 February 1579; Wallerstein aged 62-63	Children of Louis "XV" (XII), divided their inheritance.
Godfried	8 June 1554; Bietigheim-Bissingen; Son of Louis "XVI" (XIII) and Margaret of Palatinate-Lützelstein	1 March 1573 – 7 September 1622	County of Oettingen	Johanna of Hohenlohe-Waldenburg; 30 January 1575; Oettingen four children Barbara of Palatinate-Neuburg; 7 November 1591; Oettingen one child	7 September 1622; Oettingen aged 68	
William II	1544; First son of Frederick "VI" (IV) and Euphemia of Oettingen-Flochberg	2 February 1579 – 14 October 1602	County of Wallerstein	Johanna of Hohenzollern-Sigmaringen (23 June 1548 – 22 February 1604); 13 January 1564; Munich twenty-one children	14 October 1602; Wallerstein aged	Children of Frederick VI, divided their inheritance. William II's older grandchild (son of William, who predeceased his father) eventually inherited Spielberg after the early extinction of Frederick VII's line.
Frederick "IX" (V)	20 February 1556; Fourth son of Frederick "VI" (IV) and Euphemia of Oettingen-Flochberg	2 February 1579 – 20 June 1615	County of Spielberg	Ursula Heilbrunn of Pfauenau (1560-28 March 1606); 6 June 1585 five children	20 June 1615 aged 59	Children of Frederick VI, divided their inheritance. William II's older grandchild (son of William, who predeceased his father) eventually inherited Spielberg after the early extinction of Frederick VII's line.
Ulrich II	13 February 1578; Wallerstein; Sixth son of William II and Johanna of Hohenzollern-Sigmaringen	14 October 1602 – 30 September 1605	County of Wallerstein	Barbara Fugger (7 November 1577 – 4 May 1618); 25 January 1604; Augsburg no children	30 September 1605; Komárom aged 27	Children of William II, divided their inheritance.
Ernest I	24 October 1584; Wallerstein; Seventh son of William II and Johanna of Hohenzollern-Sigmaringen	14 October 1602 – 18 May 1626	County of Baldern	Catharina of Helfenstein-Wiesensteig; 20 September 1608; Wiesensteig ten children	18 May 1626; Baldern aged 41	Children of William II, divided their inheritance.
Ernest II	15 August 1594; Wallerstein; Son of Wolfgang of Oettingen-Wallerstein and Johanna de Moll	20 September 1605 – 3 March 1670	County of Wallerstein	Maria Magdalena Fugger (8 August 1606 – 3 January 1670); 7 February 1624; Wallerstein seven children	3 March 1670; Vienna aged 75	
John III	c.1590 Son of Frederick "IX" (V) and Ursula Heilbrunn of Pfauenau	20 June 1615 – 24 June 1627	County of Spielberg	Unmarried	24 June 1627 aged 36-37	Left no heirs. His county was inherited by his cousin, grandson of William II of Wallerstein.
Louis Eberhard	9 July 1577; Schillingsfürst; Son of Godfried and Johanna of Hohenlohe-Waldenburg	7 September 1622 – 4 July 1634	County of Oettingen	Margaret of Erbach; 17 May 1598; Oettingen fourteen children	4 July 1634; Heidenheim aged 56	
Martin Francis	28 August 1611; First son of Ernest I and Catharina of Helfenstein-Wiesensteig	18 May 1626 – 11 September 1653	County of Baldern	Isabella Eleonora of Helfenstein-Wiesensteig (d.22 March 1678); 1629 two children	11 September 1653; Regensburg aged 42	Children of Ernest I, divided the rule. Martin kept Baldern and Frederick William inherited Katzenstein.
Frederick William	7 May 1618; Second son of Ernest I and Catharina of Helfenstein-Wiesensteig	18 May 1626 – 20 October 1677	County of Katzenstein	Rosina Susanna of Trübeneck (24 July 1611 – 19 May 1664); 7 January 1646; Graz three children	20 October 1677; Katzenstein Castle aged 59	Children of Ernest I, divided the rule. Martin kept Baldern and Frederick William inherited Katzenstein.
John Albert	1591; Wallerstein; Son of William of Oettingen-Wallerstein and Elisabeth Fugger	1627 – 18 June 1632	County of Spielberg	Maria Elisabeth Fugger (11 September 1605 – 15 September 1628); 6 November 1622; Augsburg no children Maria Gertrude of Pappenheim-Treuchlingen (5 June 1599 – 25 March 1675); 6 November 1629; Orth two children	18 June 1632; Oberzell aged 40-41	Grandson of William II of Wallerstein, inherited his cousin's domains in Spielberg.
Regency of Maria Gertrude of Pappenheim-Treuchlingen (1632-1649)						
John Francis	13 June 1631; Oettingen or Wallerstein; Son of John Albert and Maria Gertrude of Pappenheim-Treuchlingen	18 June 1632 – 25 November 1665	County of Spielberg	Ludovica Rosalia of Atems-Tanzenberg (1630 – 1 June 1709); 11 February 1654; Tanzenberg nine children	25 November 1665; Oettingen aged 34	
Joachim Ernest	31 March 1612; Oettingen; Son of Louis Eberhard and Margaret of Erbach	4 July 1634 – 8 August 1659	County of Oettingen	Anna Sybilla of Solms-Sonnenwalde; 18 December 1633; Oettingen two children Anna Dorothea of Hohenlohe-Neuenstein-Gleichen (26 January 1621 – 16 September 1643); 5 December 1638; Neuenstein four children Anna Sophia of the Palatinate-Sulzbach; 9 May 1647; Nuremberg eight children	8 August 1659; Harburg aged 47	
Ferdinand Maximilian	25 December 1640; Son of Martin Francis and Isabella Eleonora of Helfenstein-Wiesensteig	11 September 1653 – 9 May 1687	County of Baldern	Christina Sibylla of Solms-Braunfels; 7 January 1666; Rheinfels or Greifenstein no children	9 May 1687; Parkstein aged 46	Left no heirs. His county was annexed to Katzenstein.
Baldern annexed to Katzenstein
Albert Ernest I	14 May 1642; Oettingen; Son of Joachim Ernest and Anna Dorothea of Hohenlohe-Neuenstein-Gleichen	8 August 1659 – 8 February 1683	County of Oettingen (until 1674) Principality of Oettingen (from 1674)	Christine Friederike of Württemberg; 28 May/7 June 1665; Stuttgart seven children Eberhardine Catherine of Württemberg-Winnental; 1682 no children	8 February 1683; Schrattenhofen aged 40	In 1674, his county was raised to a principality.
John Sebastian	20 January 1655; Second son of John Francis and Ludovica Rosalia of Atems-Tanzenberg	25 November 1665 – 13 September 1675	Principality of Spielberg	Unmarried	13 September 1675 aged 20	Left no heirs. He was succeeded by his brother John William.
William "IV" (III)	1 August 1627; Wallerstein; First son of Ernest II and Maria Magdalena Fugger	1670 – 11 December 1692	County of Wallerstein	Octavia Esther of Herberstein-Neuburg (d. April 1702); 27 August 1670 no children	11 December 1692 aged 65	Children of Ernest II, ruled jointly.
Wolfgang "IV" (III)	1 February 1629; Wallerstein; Second son of Ernest II and Maria Magdalena Fugger	1670 – 6 November 1708	County of Wallerstein	Anna Dorothea of Wolkenstein-Rodeneg (d.26 November 1702); 6 November 1661 fourteen children	6 November 1708; Vienna aged 65	Children of Ernest II, ruled jointly.
Philip Charles I	24 January 1640; Wallerstein; Third son of Ernest II and Maria Magdalena Fugger	1670 – 27 August 1680	County of Wallerstein	Eberhardina Sophia Juliana of Oettingen (20 October 1656 – 23 March 1743); 1 March 1678; Wallerstein two children	27 August 1680; Wallerstein aged 40	Children of Ernest II, ruled jointly.
John William	23 December 1655; Second son of John Francis and Ludovica Rosalia of Atems-Tanzenberg	13 September 1675 – 10 August 1685	Principality of Spielberg	Maria Anna Theresa von Oettingen-Wallerstein (24 August 1662 – 28 June 1695); 29 April 1685; Wallerstein no children	10 August 1685 aged 29	Left no male heirs. He was succeeded by his brother Francis Albert.
Notger William	24 December 1650; Graz; Son of Frederick William and Rosina Susanna of Trübeneck	20 October 1677 – 6 November 1693	County of Katzenstein	Maria Sidonia of Sötern (d.23 September 1691); 10 February 1682; Wadern four children Maria Ernestina of Oettingen-Wallerstein (15 September 1663 – 29 April 1714); 7 July 1692; Vienna one child	6 November 1693; Hungen aged 42	
Albert Ernest II	8 August 1669; Oettingen; Son of Albert Ernest I and Christine Friederike of Württemberg	8 February 1683 – 30 March 1731	Principality of Oettingen	Sophia Louise of Hesse-Darmstadt; 11 October 1688; Darmstadt two children	30 March 1731; Schrattenhofen aged 61	Left no male heirs. After his death, the county was annexed to Wallerstein
Oettingen annexed to Wallerstein
Francis Albert	10 November 1663; Oettingen; Third son of John Francis and Ludovica Rosalia of Atems-Tanzenberg	10 August 1685 – 3 February 1737	County of Spielberg (until 1734) Principality of Spielberg (from 1734)	Johanna Margaretha of Schwendi (27 June 1672 – 25 April 1727); 26 June 1689; Oettingen in Bayern five children	3 February 1737; Oettingen aged 73	
Crato Anton	8 October 1684; Dischingen; Son of Notger William and Maria Sidonia of Sötern	6 November 1693 – 25 April 1751	County of Katzenstein	Johanna Eleonora Maria of Schönborn-Buchheim (2 July 1688 – 12 February 1763); 10 February 1709; Aschaffenburg seventeen children	25 April 1751; Baldern aged 66	
Francis Ignaz Joseph	27 November 1672; First son of Wolfgang IV and Anna Dorothea of Wolkenstein-Rodeneg	6 November 1708 – 3 October 1728	County of Wallerstein	Unmarried	3 October 1728 aged 55	Cousins, ruled jointly. Anton was the son of Philip Charles, and the others were Wolfgang IV's sons.
Dominic Joseph	3 September 1676; Second son of Wolfgang IV and Anna Dorothea of Wolkenstein-Rodeneg	6 November 1708 – 25 October 1717	County of Wallerstein	Unmarried	25 October 1717 aged 41	Cousins, ruled jointly. Anton was the son of Philip Charles, and the others were Wolfgang IV's sons.
William Joseph Ignaz	October 1677; Third son of Wolfgang IV and Anna Dorothea of Wolkenstein-Rodeneg	6 November 1708 – 1718	County of Wallerstein	Unmarried	1718 aged 40-41	Cousins, ruled jointly. Anton was the son of Philip Charles, and the others were Wolfgang IV's sons.
Anton Charles	28 June 1679; Wallerstein; Son of Philip Charles I and Eberhardina Sophia Juliana of Oettingen	6 November 1708 – 14 April 1738	County of Wallerstein	Maria Agnes Magdalena Fugger (21 October 1680 – 17 June 1753); 24 January 1702; Neuburg an der Donau seven children	14 April 1738; Vienna aged 58	Cousins, ruled jointly. Anton was the son of Philip Charles, and the others were Wolfgang IV's sons.
John Alois I	18 January 1707; Oettingen; First son of Francis Albert and Johanna Margaretha von Schwendi	3 February 1737 – 16 February 1780	Principality of Spielberg	Theresa Maria Anna of Holstein-Sonderburg (19 December 1713 – 14 July 1745); 23 May 1735; Watzdorf (near Rohrbach an der Gölsen) three children	16 February 1780; Oettingen aged 73	Children of Francis Albert, ruled jointly.
Anton Ernest	12 February 1712; Oettingen; Second son of Francis Albert and Johanna Margaretha von Schwendi	3 February 1737 – 23 May 1768	Principality of Spielberg	Maria Theresa Walburga of Waldburg (27 May 1735 – 23 December 1789); 5 May 1754; Munich nine children	23 May 1768; Schwendi aged 56	Children of Francis Albert, ruled jointly.
John Charles Frederick	10 June 1715; Augsburg; First son of Anton Charles and Maria Agnes Magdalena Fugger	14 April 1738 – 16 July 1744	County of Wallerstein	Maria Anna Josepha Fugger (21 May 1719 – 11 January 1784); 13 August 1741; Munich two children	16 July 1744; Stuttgart aged 29	Children of Anton Charles, ruled jointly.
Philip Charles II	17 March 1722; Augsburg; Second son of Anton Charles and Maria Agnes Magdalena Fugger	14 April 1738 – 14 April 1766	County of Wallerstein	Charlotte Juliana of Oettingen-Katzenstein (25 October 1728 – 2 January 1791); 21 February 1746; Baldern thirteen children	14 April 1766; Wallerstein aged 44	Children of Anton Charles, ruled jointly.
Lothar Francis	9 December 1709; Mainz; First son of Crato Anton and Johanna Eleonora Maria of Schönborn-Buchheim	25 April 1751 – 5 September 1780	County of Katzenstein	Unmarried	5 September 1780; Elwangen aged 70	Children of Crato Anton, ruled jointly. After their deaths, their county was annexed to Wallerstein.
Philip Charles III	15 October 1712; Baldern; Third son of Crato Anton and Johanna Eleonora Maria of Schönborn-Buchheim	25 April 1751 – 30 May 1787	County of Katzenstein	Unmarried	30 May 1787; Eichstätt aged 74	Children of Crato Anton, ruled jointly. After their deaths, their county was annexed to Wallerstein.
Joseph Anton Damian	4 March 1720; Baldern; Fifth son of Crato Anton and Johanna Eleonora Maria of Schönborn-Buchheim	25 April 1751 – 20 April 1778	County of Katzenstein	Rosina Susanna of Trübeneck (24 July 1611 – 19 May 1664); 7 January 1646; Graz three children	20 April 1778; Dagstuhl aged 58	Children of Crato Anton, ruled jointly. After their deaths, their county was annexed to Wallerstein.
Katzenstein annexed to Wallerstein
Crato Ernest	3 August 1748; Son of Philip Charles IIand Charlotte Juliana of Oettingen-Katzenstein	14 April 1766 – 6 October 1802	County of Wallerstein (until 1774) Principality of Wallerstein (from 1774)	Maria Theresa Carolina of Thurn and Taxis (10 July 1757 – 9 March 1776); 25 August 1744; Trugenhofen one child Wilhelmina Friederika Elisabeth of Württemberg (3 July 1764 – 9 August 1817); 20 October 1789; Weiltingen twelve children	6 October 1802; Wallerstein aged 54	
John Alois II	16 April 1758; Son of Anton Ernest and Maria Theresa Walburga of Waldburg	16 February 1780 – 27 June 1797	Principality of Spielberg	Henrika Carolina of Thurn and Taxis (1762-25 April 1784); 21 April 1783; Regensburg one child Maria Aloysia of Auersperg (21 November 1762 – 19 May 1825); 7 May 1787; Vienna five children	27 June 1797; Neuburg an der Donau aged 39	
John Alois III	9 May 1788; Oettingen; First son of John Alois II and Maria Aloysia of Auersperg	27 June 1797 – 12 July 1806	Principality of Spielberg	Amalia Augusta of Wrede (15 January 1796 – 11 September 1871); 31 August 1813; Hohaltingen four children	7 May 1855; Munich aged 66	Children of John Alois II, ruled jointly. In 1806, with the German mediatisation, the brothers lost the Principality.
Charles Frederick	29 March 1790; Second son of John Alois II and Maria Aloysia of Auersperg	27 June 1797 – 12 July 1806	Principality of Spielberg	Unmarried	30 October 1813 near Hanau aged 23	Children of John Alois II, ruled jointly. In 1806, with the German mediatisation, the brothers lost the Principality.
Spielberg mediatised to the Kingdom of Bavaria
Regency of Wilhelmina Friederika Elisabeth of Württemberg (1802-1806)						Ruled under regency. In 1806, with the German mediatisation, Louis Kraft (and his mother) lost the Principality. In 1823 he renounced his right after marrying morganatically.
Louis Crato Ernest	31 January 1791; Wallerstein; Son of Crato Ernest and Wilhelmina Friederika Elisabeth of Württemberg	6 October 1802 – 12 July 1806	Principality of Wallerstein	Maria Crescentia Bourgin (3 May 1806 – 22 June 1853); 7 July 1823 (morganatic) two children Albertine Larisch von Moennich (20 May 1819 – 10 June 1900); 18 July 1857 no children	22 June 1870; Lucerne aged 79	Ruled under regency. In 1806, with the German mediatisation, Louis Kraft (and his mother) lost the Principality. In 1823 he renounced his right after marrying morganatically.
Wallerstein mediatised to the Kingdom of Bavaria

== Lines of succession (post-mediatisation) ==
=== Mediatized line of Wallerstein ===
- Ludwig Kraft, 2nd Prince 1806–1823 (1791-1870)
- Friedrich Kraft, 3rd Prince 1823-1842 (1793–1842)
  - Karl Friedrich I, 4th Prince 1842–1905 (1840-1905)
    - Karl Friedrich II, 5th Prince 1905–1930 (1877-1930)
    - Eugen, 6th Prince 1930–1969 (1885-1969), politician
      - Karl Friedrich III, 7th Prince 1969–1991 (1917-1991)
        - Moritz, 8th Prince 1991–present (born 1946)
          - Karl Eugen, Hereditary Prince of Oettingen-Oettingen and Oettingen-Wallerstein (born 1970)
            - Princess Helena (born 1995)
            - Prince Johannes (born 1998), engaged to Luisa Textor
            - Prince Eugen (born 2004)
          - Prince Ludwig-Maximilian (born 1972)
            - Prince Felix (born 2003)
            - Prince Dominik (born 2007)
          - Prince Friedrich-Alexander (born 1978)
        - Prince Kraft Ernst (born 1951)
          - Prince Philipp-Karl (born 1983)
          - Prince Leopold-Ludwig (born 1987)

=== Mediatised line of Spielberg ===
- Johann Aloys III Anton, 4th Prince 1806–1855 (1788–1855)
  - Otto I Karl, 5th Prince 1855–1882 (1815–1882)
    - Franz Albrecht II, 6th Prince 1882–1916 (1847–1916)
    - Emil, 7th Prince 1916–1919 (1850–1919)
      - Otto II Joseph, 8th Prince 1919–1952 (1879–1952)
        - Aloys Philipp, 9th Prince 1952–1975 (1920–1975)
          - Albrecht Ernst, 10th Prince 1975–2025 (1951–2025)
            - Franz Albrecht, 11th Prince 2025–present (born 1982)
              - Louis-Albrecht, Hereditary Prince of Oettingen-Oettingen and Oettingen-Spielberg (born 2019)

== Other important members ==
- Irmengard of Oettingen, Countess Palatine of the Rhine (c. 1304–1389)
- Elisabeth of Oettingen, Landgravine of Leuchtenberg (c. 1360–1406)
- Wolfgang I of Oettingen, Count of Oettingen-Oettingen (1455-1522)
- Maria Magdalena of Oettingen-Baldern, Margravine of Baden-Baden (1619-1688)
- Maria Dorothea Sophia of Oettingen-Oettingen (1639-1698), second wife of Eberhard III, Duke of Württemberg
- Princess Christine Louise of Oettingen-Oettingen (1671-1747), wife of Louis Rudolph, Duke of Brunswick-Lüneburg. She was the maternal grandmother of Holy Roman Empress Maria Theresa, Tsar Peter II of Russia, Queen Elisabeth Christine of Prussia and Queen Juliane Marie of Denmark and Norway.
- Maria Anna of Oettingen-Spielberg (1693-1729), wife of Joseph Johann Adam, Prince of Liechtenstein
- Princess Gabriele of Oettingen-Oettingen and Oettingen-Spielberg (b. 1953), daughter of the 9th Prince
- Princess Nora zu Oettingen-Spielberg (b. 1990), daughter of Albrecht Ernst, Prince of Oettingen-Oettingen and Oettingen-Spielberg. Married 2017, Lord Max Percy, youngest son of Ralph Percy, 12th Duke of Northumberland
- Cleopatra, Hereditary Princess of Oettingen-Oettingen and Oettingen-Spielberg (b. 1987), wife of Franz Albrecht, 11th Prince of Oettingen-Oettingen and Oettingen-Spielberg

== Residences ==
The following castles are still owned by the Princes of Oettingen-Spielberg and Oettingen-Wallerstein:

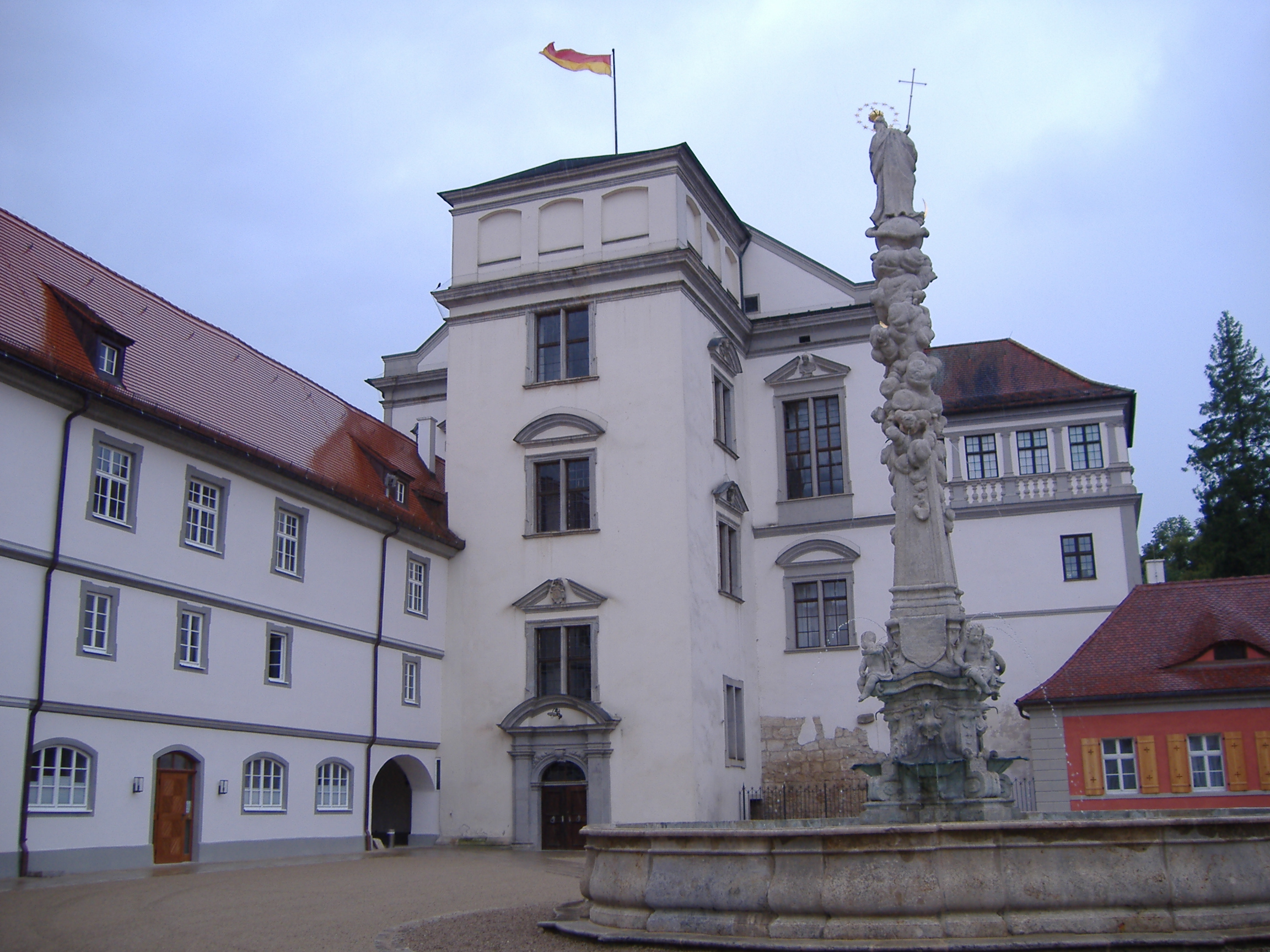
Oettingen

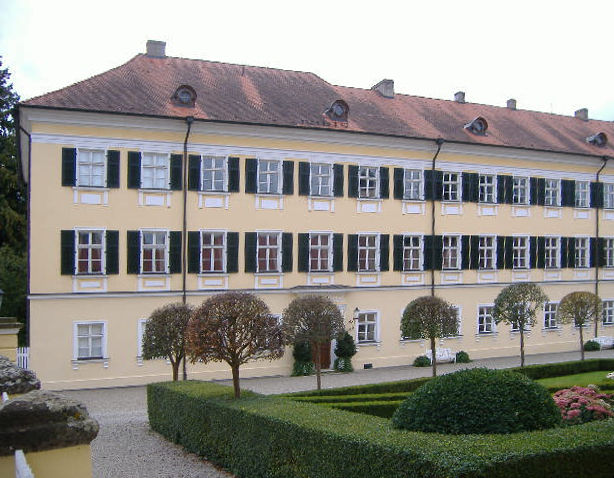
Wallerstein

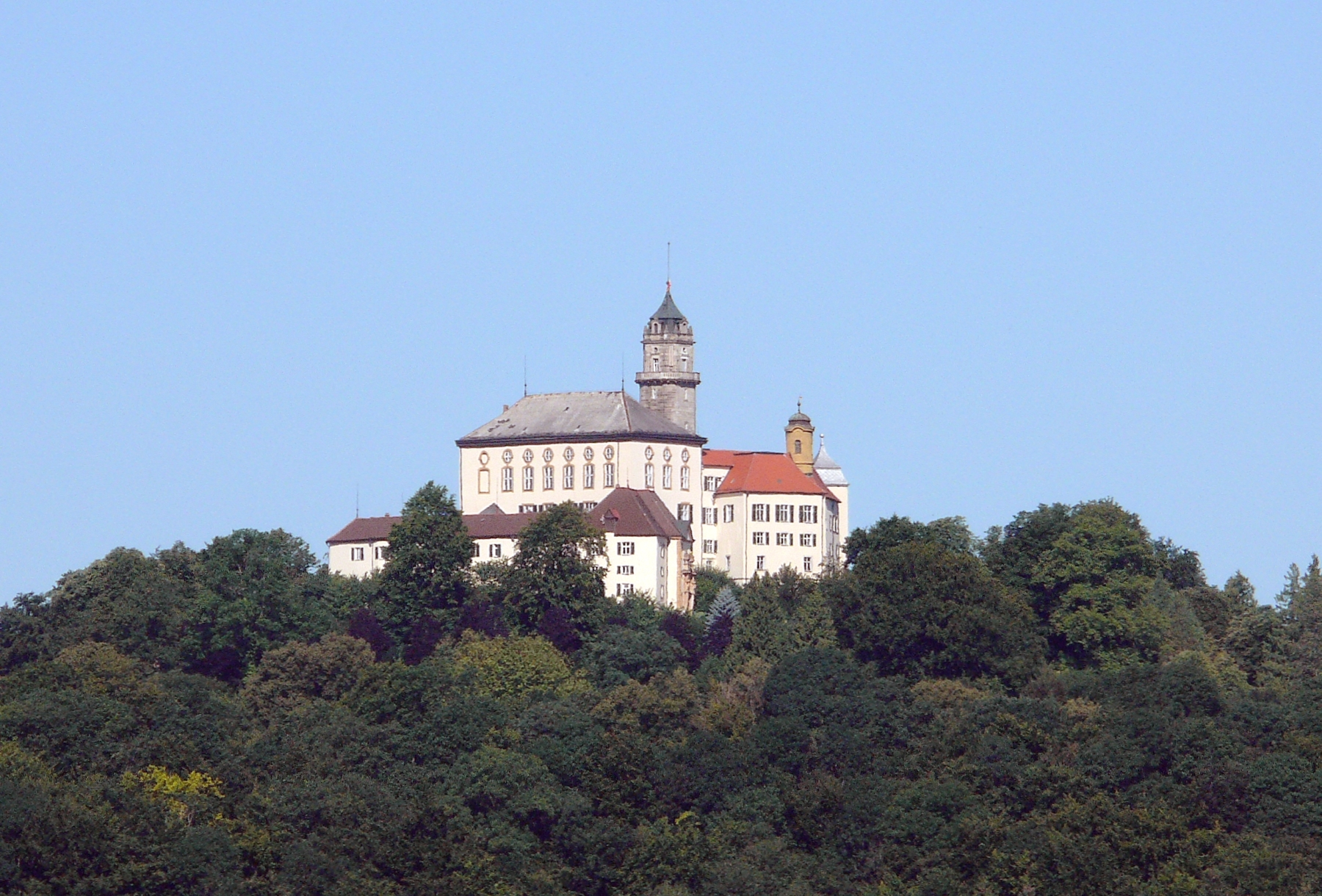
Baldern (near Bopfingen)

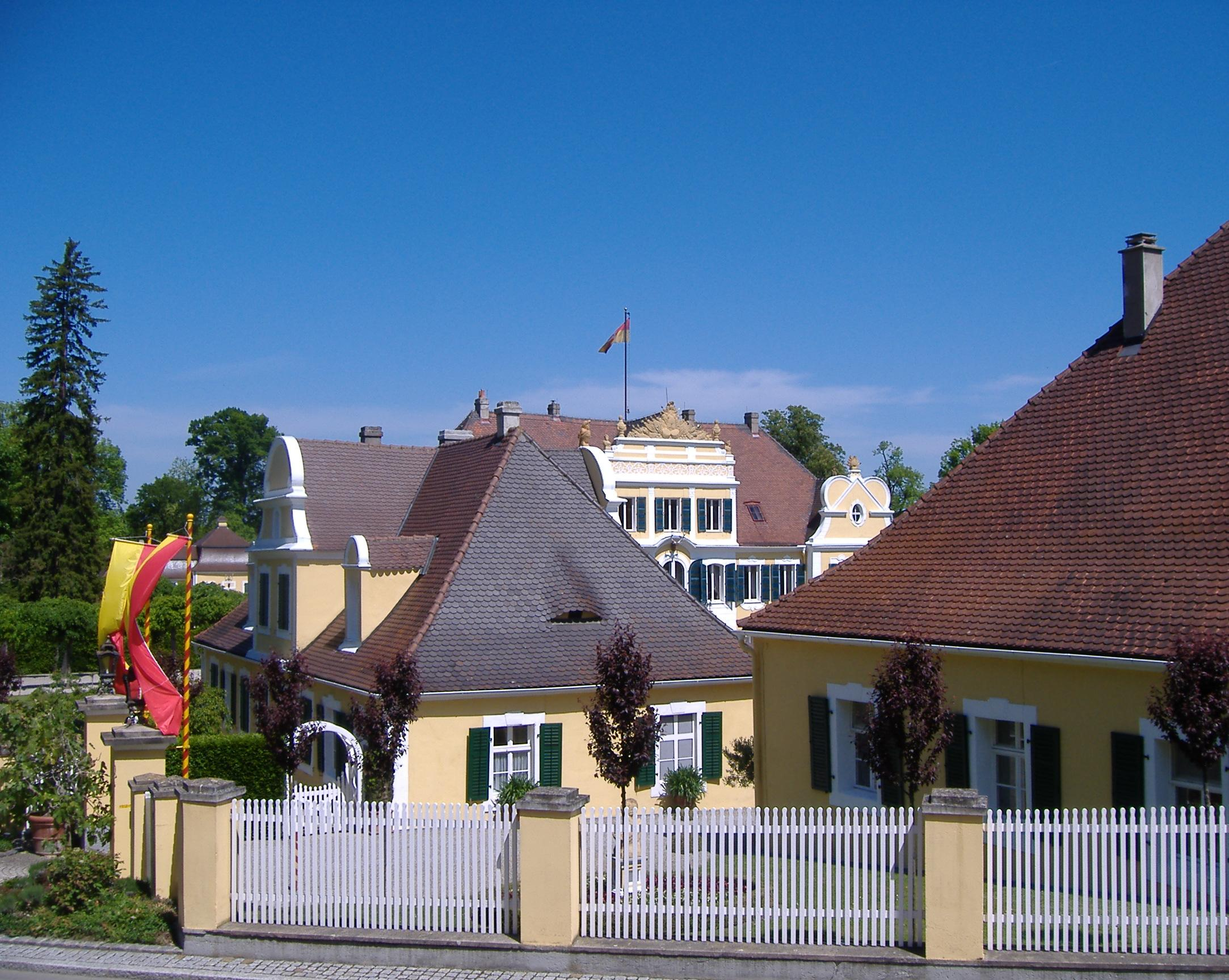
Hohenaltheim

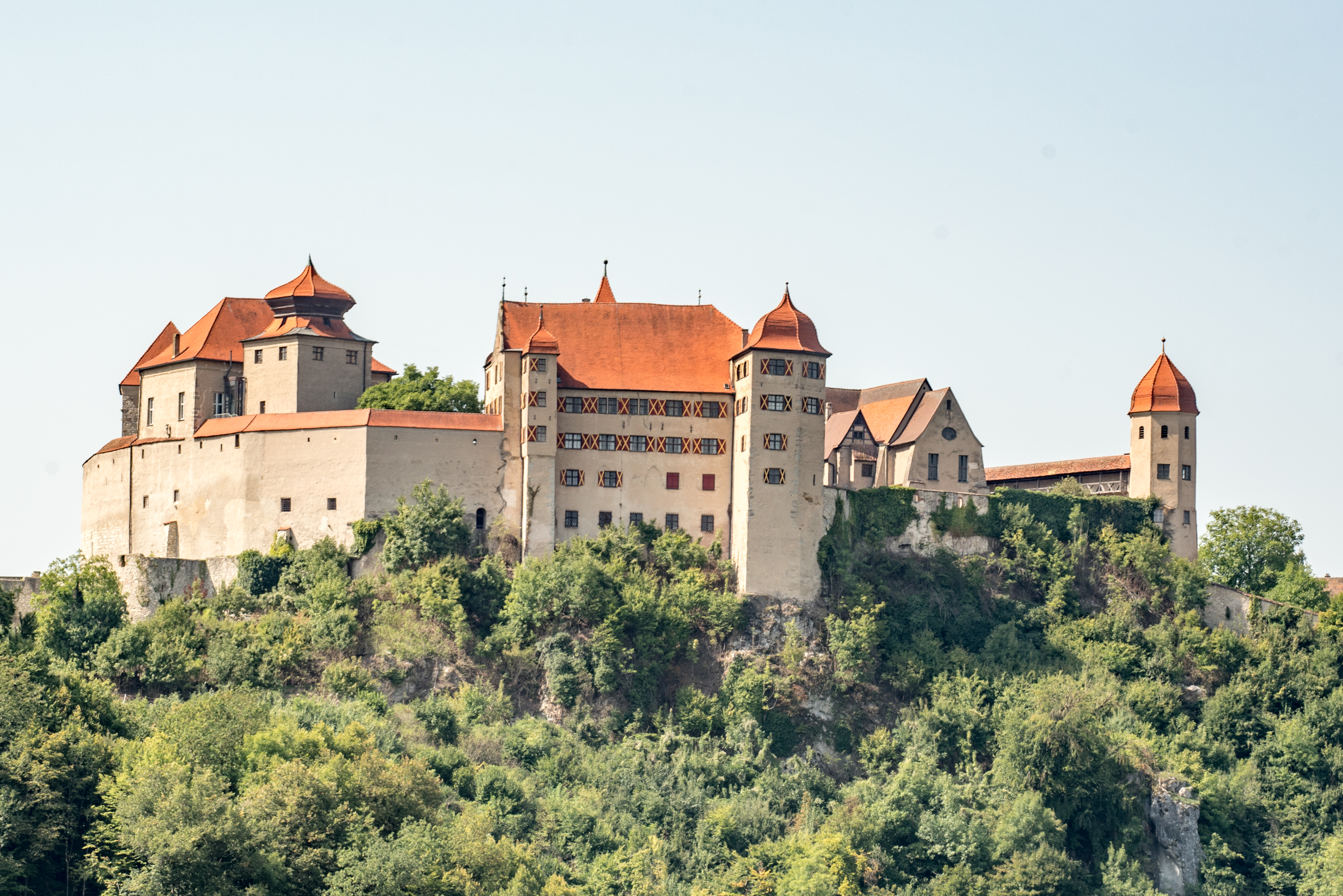
Harburg

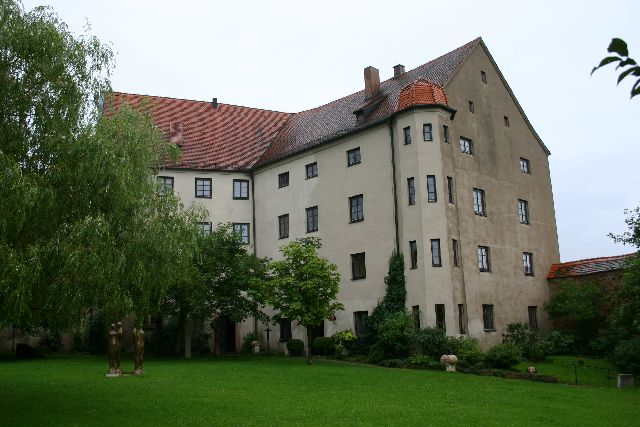
Spielberg Castle in Gnotzheim

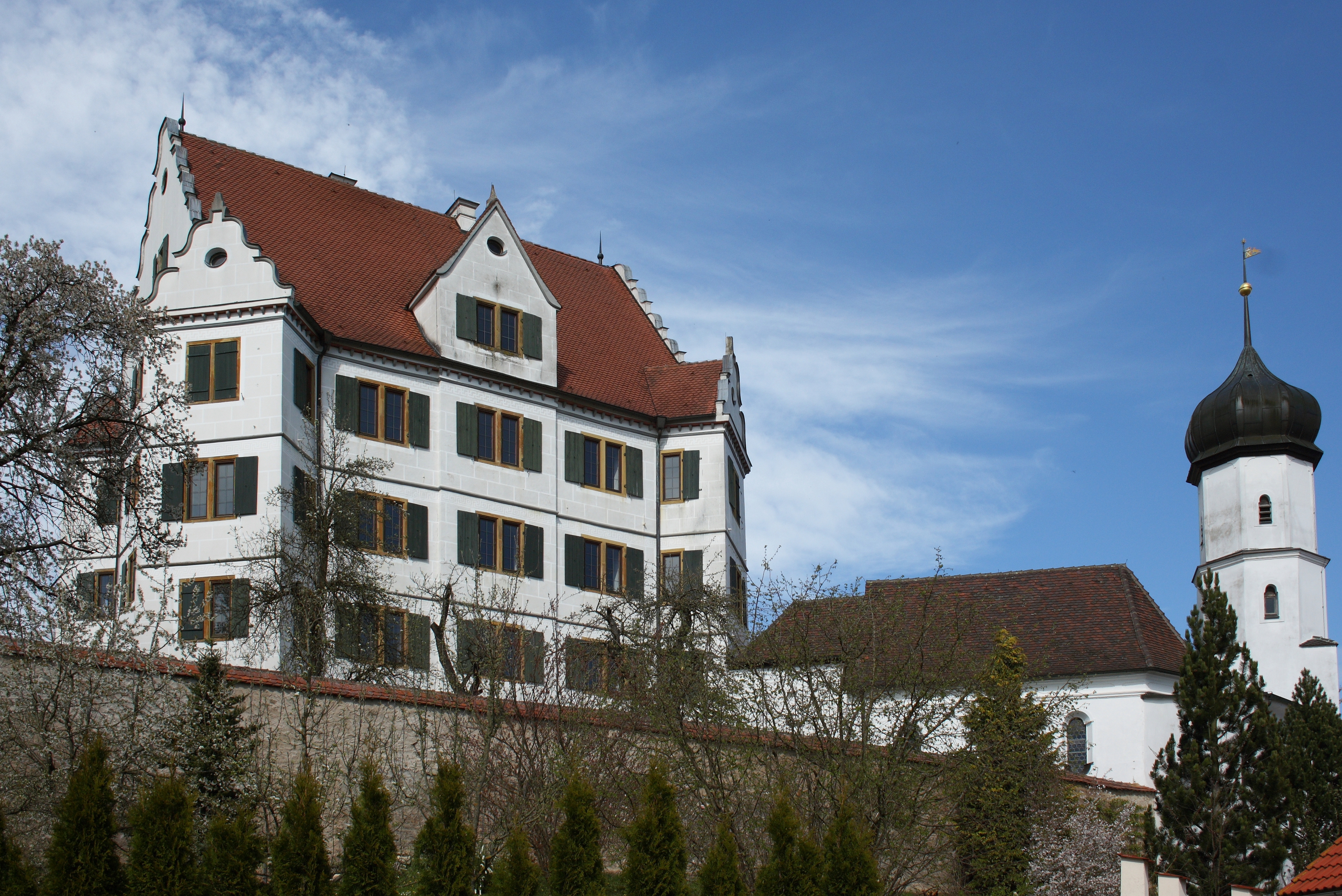
Schloss Hirschbrunn

== See also ==
- Oettingen in Bayern

== Bibliography ==
- Fürstlich Oettingen-Wallerstein'sche Bibliothek (1985) Oettingen-Wallerstein'sche Musiksammlung. München: K. G. Saur (reproduced on 3819 microfiches) ISBN 3598307306
- Genealogisches Handbuch des Adels, Band IX, C. A. Starke Verlag, 1998, ISBN 3-7980-0816-7 (= Adelslexikon, Gesamtreihe Band 116) (for further references).
- Teresa Neumeyer: Dinkelsbühl. Der ehemalige Landkreis Kommission für bayerische Landesgeschichte München 2018 (= Historischer Atlas von Bayern, 40. Franken I), ISBN 978-3-7696-6562-8 ( at Google Books).
- Europäische Stammtafeln. Stammtafeln zur Geschichte der europäischen Staaten, Bd. V. Von Frank Baron Freytag von Loringhoven aus dem Nachlass hrsg. von Detlev Schwennicke, Marburg 1978, Tafeln 152–155.
- Constantin von Wurzbach: "Oettingen-Wallerstein, die Fürsten von, Genealogie." In: Biographisches Lexikon des Kaiserthums Oesterreich (Biographical Lexicon of the Empire of Austria). Part 21 Kaiserlich-königliche Hof- und Staatsdruckerei, Vienna 1870, p. 29 (digitalised).
- Volker von Volckamer (1999). "Oettingen, Grafen und Fürsten zu". Neue Deutsche Biographie (in German). Vol. 19. Berlin: Duncker & Humblot. pp. 472–474. (full text online).
- Jacob Paul Lang: Materialien zur oettingischen älteren und neueren Geschichte, Bd. 2, Wallerstein 1773.
- Zedlers Grosses vollständiges Universal-Lexikon, Bd. 25, Leipzig und Halle 1740, Sp. 801–820.
- Alexandra Haas (2018), Hexen und Herrschaftspolitik. Die Reichsgrafen von Oettingen und ihr Umgang mit den Hexenprozessen im Vergleich (in German), Bielefeld: Verlag für Regionalgeschichte, ISBN 978-3-7395-1107-8
