= Munningen =

- Municipality
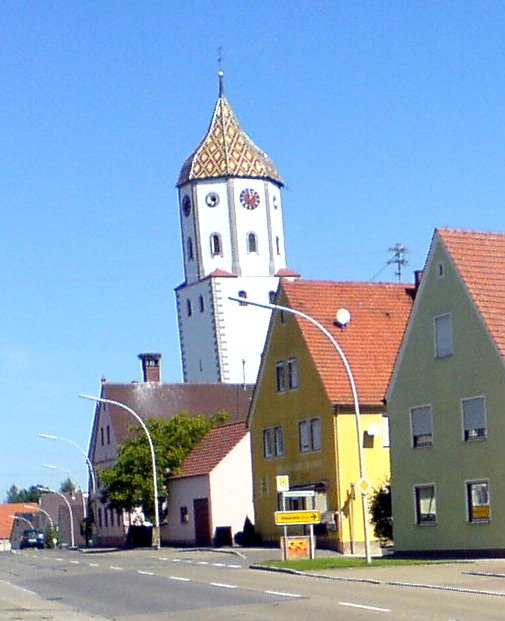
- Leaning tower of the Church of Saints Peter and Paul

- Coat of arms

- Location of Munningen within Donau-Ries district
- Interactive map of Munningen
- Location within Germany Location within Bavaria
- Coordinates: 48°55′N 10°35′E
- Country: Germany
- State: Bavaria
- Admin. region: Schwaben
- District: Donau-Ries
- Municipal assoc.: Oettingen in Bayern

Government
  - Mayor (2020–26): Dietmar Höhenberger

Area
  - Total: 22.76 km^{2} (8.79 sq mi)
- Elevation: 415 m (1,362 ft)

Population (2025-12-31)
  - Total: 1,706
  - Density: 74.96/km^{2} (194.1/sq mi)
- Time zone: UTC+01:00 (CET)
  - Summer (DST): UTC+02:00 (CEST)
- Postal codes: 86754
- Dialling codes: 09082
- Vehicle registration: DON
- Website: www.munningen.de

Munningen (German pronunciation: [ˈmʊnɪŋən]) is a municipality in the district of Donau-Ries in Bavaria in Germany.
