= Bernhard Mettenleiter =

Bernhard Mettenleiter (German: [ˈbɛʁnhaʁt mɛtn̩ˈlaɪ̯tɐ]; 25 April 1822 (Note: Sources such as this often mistakenly record his date of birth as 5 April 1822.), Wallerstein – 14 January 1901, Marktheidenfeld) was a German composer and organist. He was known as the choir director in Günzburg, Memmingen, and Sankt Lorenz. He was the cousin of the composer, Johann Georg Mettenleiter.

== Compositions ==
- Four preludes in 175 Neue Orgelstücke, Op.70 by Johann Diebold (1842 – 1929)
