= Oettinger Brewery =

German brewery

Oettinger Brauerei GmbH
- Type: Gesellschaft mit beschränkter Haftung
- Location: Oettingen in Bayern, Germany
- Opened: 1731
- Annual production volume: 5.39 million hectolitres (4,590,000 US bbl) in 2015
- Owner: Dirk Kollmar, Kurt Meyer, Michael Mayer
- Employees: 1100
- Website: www.oettinger-bier.de

Oettinger Brauerei is a brewery group in Germany. Oettinger was Germany's best selling beer brand between 2004 and 2013 with an annual output of 6.21 million hectolitres (5,290,000 US bbl) in 2011.

Oettinger's headquarters are in Oettingen in Bayern but they also have breweries in Mönchengladbach and Braunschweig. They had a brewery in Gotha however this was closed in late 2022.

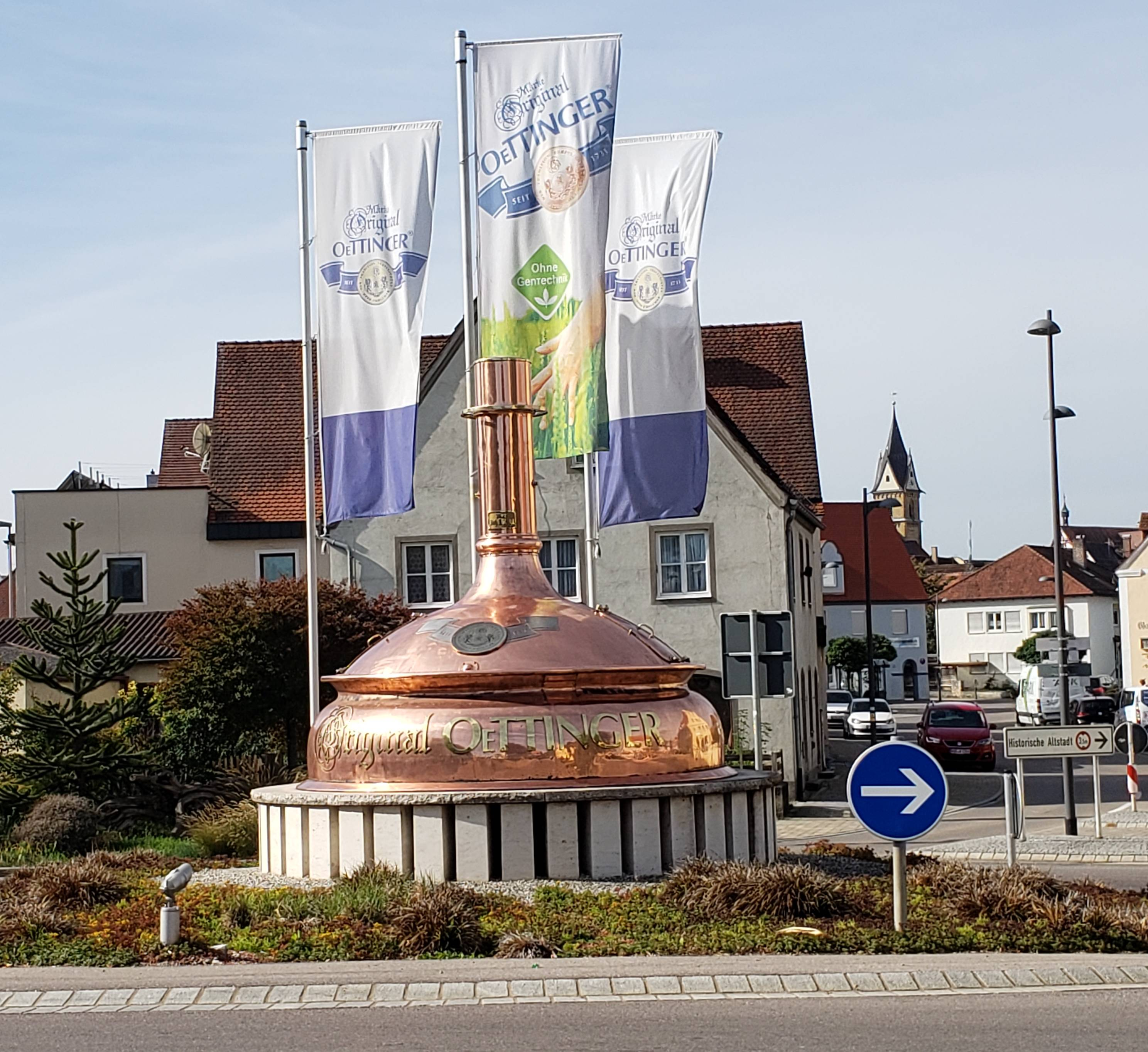
Copper mash tun in the main vehicle roundabout as you enter Oettingen

== Affordable beer ==
Oettinger bought the brewery producing "5,0 Original" beer in Braunschweig, a competitor in the same market segment. Oettinger is rarely found on tap in pubs and bars – most of it is sold bottled in supermarkets.

It is also exported – in Australia Oettinger Pils is directly imported by the Endeavour Group liquor outlets where it is sold in 330 mL bottles, as well as 500 mL cans.

Oettinger uses several ways to keep beer prices low:

- Oettinger does not advertise.
- Oettinger does not involve any intermediaries; brewery-owned trucks deliver directly to stores.
- The brewing process is highly automated and uses few employees to brew vast amounts of beer.

The low price has made this beer brand the most successful one in Germany with an output of 6.21 million hectolitres (5,290,000 US bbl) in 2011.

A stronger version, "Oettinger super forte" (8.9% alcohol by volume), is also available.

== History ==
The "Fürstliche Brauhaus zu Oettingen" (Prince's brewhouse at Oettingen) was bought in 1956 by the Kollmar family and renamed "Oettinger Brauerei GmbH".

Oettinger Group claims that its beer is brewed in accordance with the Reinheitsgebot.

== Sponsorship ==
From 2006 until 2018, Oettinger was the official sponsor of Rockets, a professional basketball club based in Gotha. The Rockets played as "Oettinger Rockets" in Germany's first division, the Basketball Bundesliga.

== See also ==
- Beer in Germany § Breweries
- List of brewing companies in Germany
