= Megesheim =

- Municipality
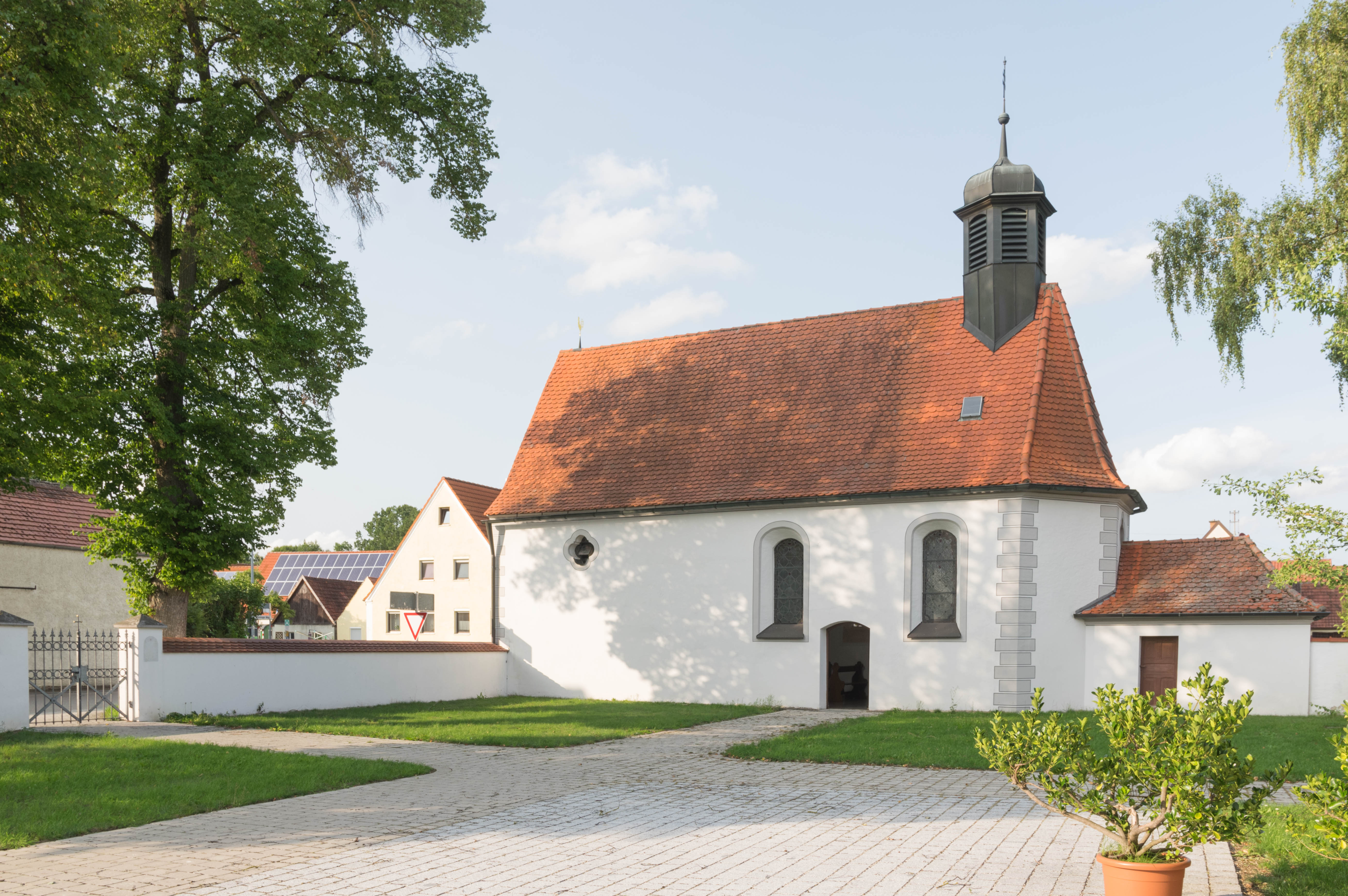
- Chapel of Saint Anne

- Coat of arms

- Location of Megesheim within Donau-Ries district
- Interactive map of Megesheim
- Location within Germany Location within Bavaria
- Coordinates: 48°56′N 10°39′E
- Country: Germany
- State: Bavaria
- Admin. region: Schwaben
- District: Donau-Ries
- Municipal assoc.: Oettingen in Bayern

Government
  - Mayor (2020–26): Karl Kolb

Area
  - Total: 12.53 km^{2} (4.84 sq mi)
- Elevation: 422 m (1,385 ft)

Population (2025-12-31)
  - Total: 837
  - Density: 66.8/km^{2} (173/sq mi)
- Time zone: UTC+01:00 (CET)
  - Summer (DST): UTC+02:00 (CEST)
- Postal codes: 86750
- Dialling codes: 09082
- Vehicle registration: DON
- Website: www.megesheim.de

Megesheim is a municipality in the district of Donau-Ries in Bavaria in Germany.
