= Oettingen in Bayern (Verwaltungsgemeinschaft) =

- Verwaltungsgemeinschaft
- Location of Oettingen in Bayern within Donau-Ries district
- Interactive map of Oettingen in Bayern
- Location within Germany Location within Bavaria
- Coordinates: 48°57′N 10°35′E
- Country: Germany
- State: Bavaria
- Admin. region: Swabia
- District: Donau-Ries
- Seat: Oettingen in Bayern
- Subdivisions: 6 municipalities

Area
  - Total: 118.25 km^{2} (45.66 sq mi)

Population (2025-12-31)
  - Total: 10,932
  - Density: 92.448/km^{2} (239.44/sq mi)
- Time zone: UTC+01:00 (CET)
  - Summer (DST): UTC+02:00 (CEST)
- Website: www.vg-oettingen.de

Oettingen in Bayern is a Verwaltungsgemeinschaft (municipal association) in the district Donau-Ries in Bavaria, Germany. Its seat is in Oettingen in Bayern.

It consists of the following municipalities:

1. Auhausen
2. Ehingen am Ries
3. Hainsfarth
4. Megesheim
5. Munningen
6. Oettingen in Bayern
