= Wolfgang I of Oettingen =

German nobleman

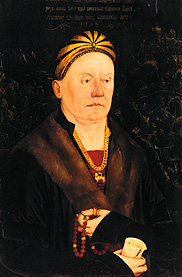
Portrait of Wolfgang I of Oettingen by Martin Schaffner, 1508

Wolfgang I of Oettingen (16 May 1455 – 29 January 1522, Harburg) was a Count of Oettingen-Oettingen.

He was third son of Count Wilhelm of Oettingen (1413 – 12 March 1467) and his wife Beatrice della Scala from the family of Scaliger. He was a Count of Oettingen after the death of his brother John II of Oettingen, who died in 1519 without male heirs. In 1482 he married with Anna of Waldburg and Waldsee (d. 20 March 1507). They had two sons:

- Charles (1474–1549)
- Louis (1486–1557).
