= Schloss Oettingen =

Palace in Oettingen, Bavaria, Germany

Coordinates: 48°57′17″N 10°36′20″E

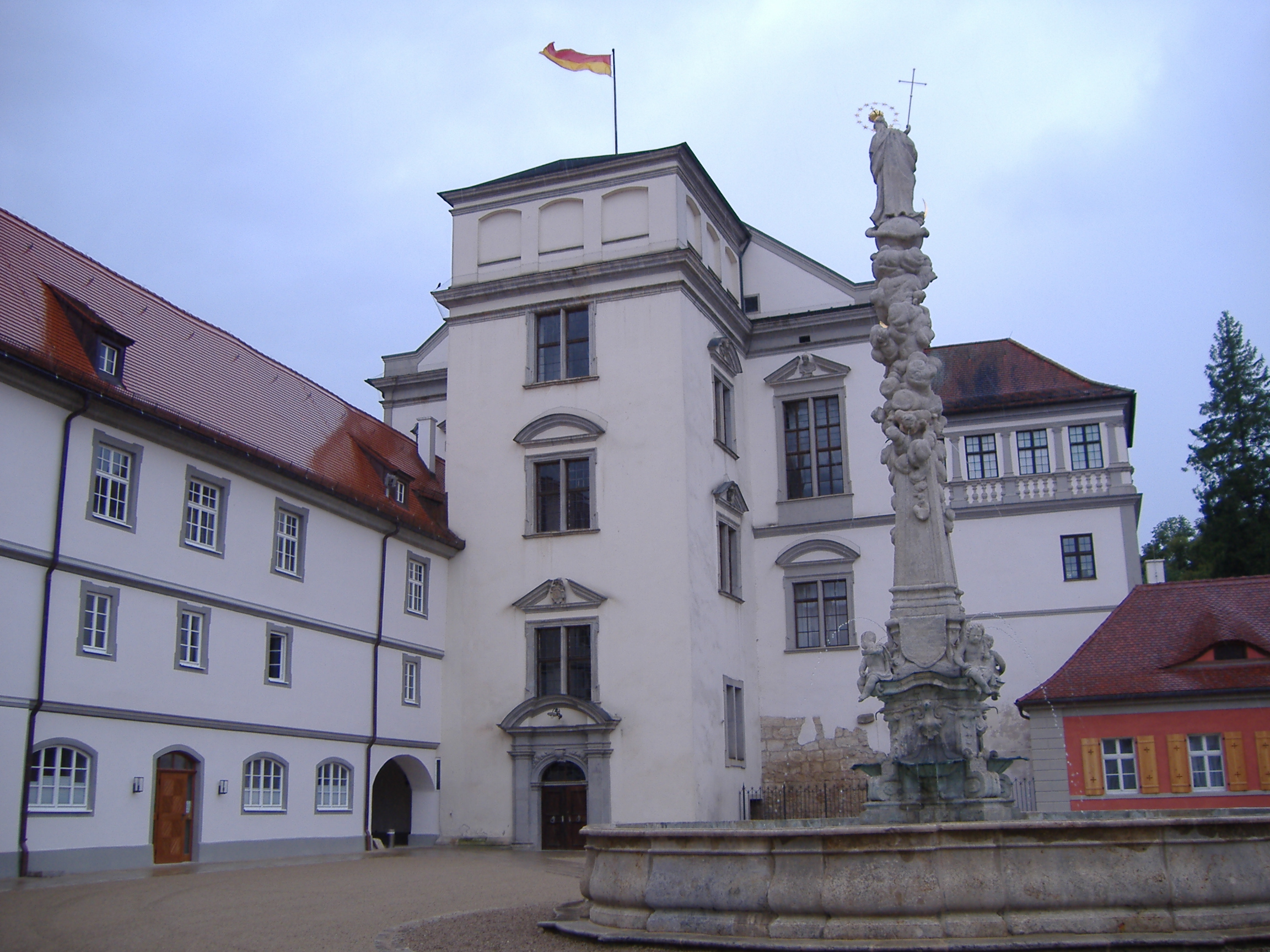
Inner courtyard of the castle in 2012

Schloss Oettingen is a Baroque palace in Oettingen in Bayern, Germany. It is privately owned by the House of Oettingen-Spielberg.

== History ==
Schloss Oettingen was built between 1679 and 1687. Construction was overseen by Karl Engel, a brother of the Prince-Bishop's master builder, Jakob Engel. It was built in the Baroque style. The palace has served as a family seat for the House of Oettingen-Spielberg, a German noble family and cadet branch of the House of Oettingen, and is still owned by the family. Schloss Oettingen is located in Oettingen in Bayern, in the Donau-Ries district of Swabia, Bavaria.

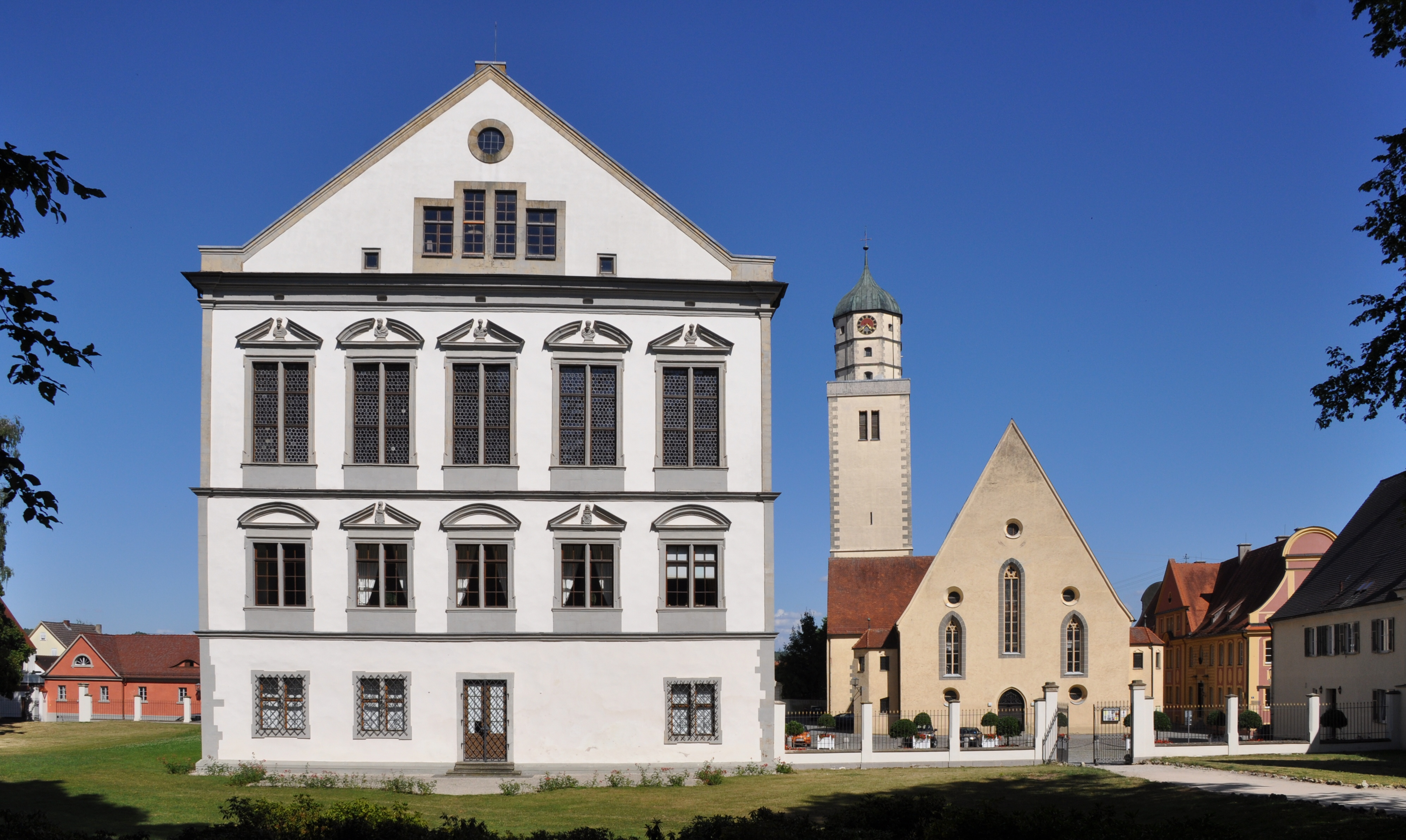
Schloss Oettingen and St. Jackob Church
