= Ehingen am Ries =

- Municipality
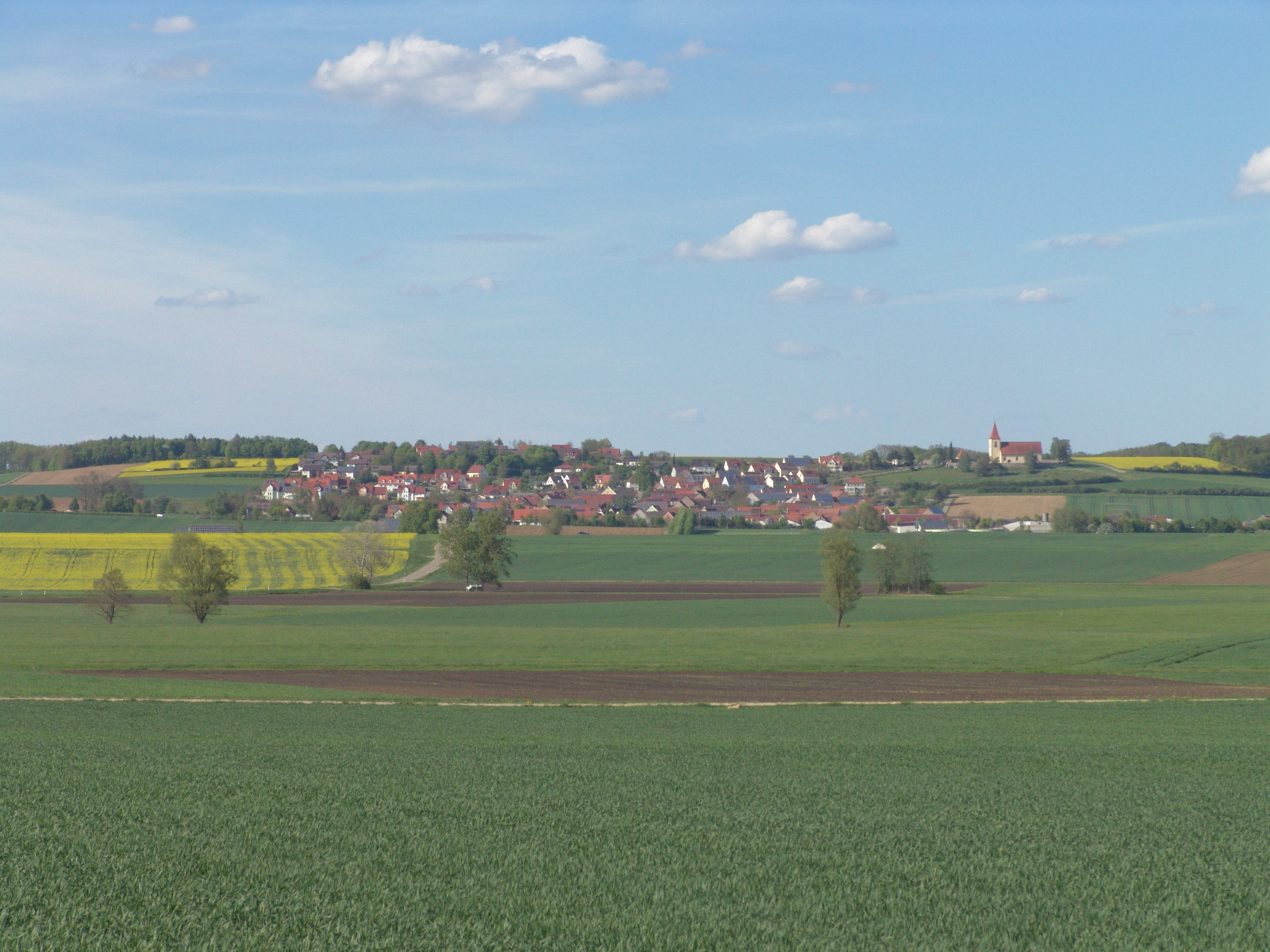
- General view of the village from the south. Church of Saint Stephen to the right.

- Coat of arms

- Location of Ehingen am Ries within Donau-Ries district
- Interactive map of Ehingen am Ries
- Location within Germany Location within Bavaria
- Coordinates: 48°58′N 10°33′E
- Country: Germany
- State: Bavaria
- Admin. region: Schwaben
- District: Donau-Ries
- Municipal assoc.: Oettingen in Bayern

Government
  - Mayor (2020–26): Thomas Meyer

Area
  - Total: 15.64 km^{2} (6.04 sq mi)
- Elevation: 440 m (1,440 ft)

Population (2025-12-31)
  - Total: 756
  - Density: 48.3/km^{2} (125/sq mi)
- Time zone: UTC+01:00 (CET)
  - Summer (DST): UTC+02:00 (CEST)
- Postal codes: 86741
- Dialling codes: 09082
- Vehicle registration: DON
- Website: www.ehingen-am-ries.de

Ehingen am Ries is a municipality in the district of Donau-Ries in Bavaria in Germany.
