= Wallerstein, Bavaria =

Wallerstein
- Municipality
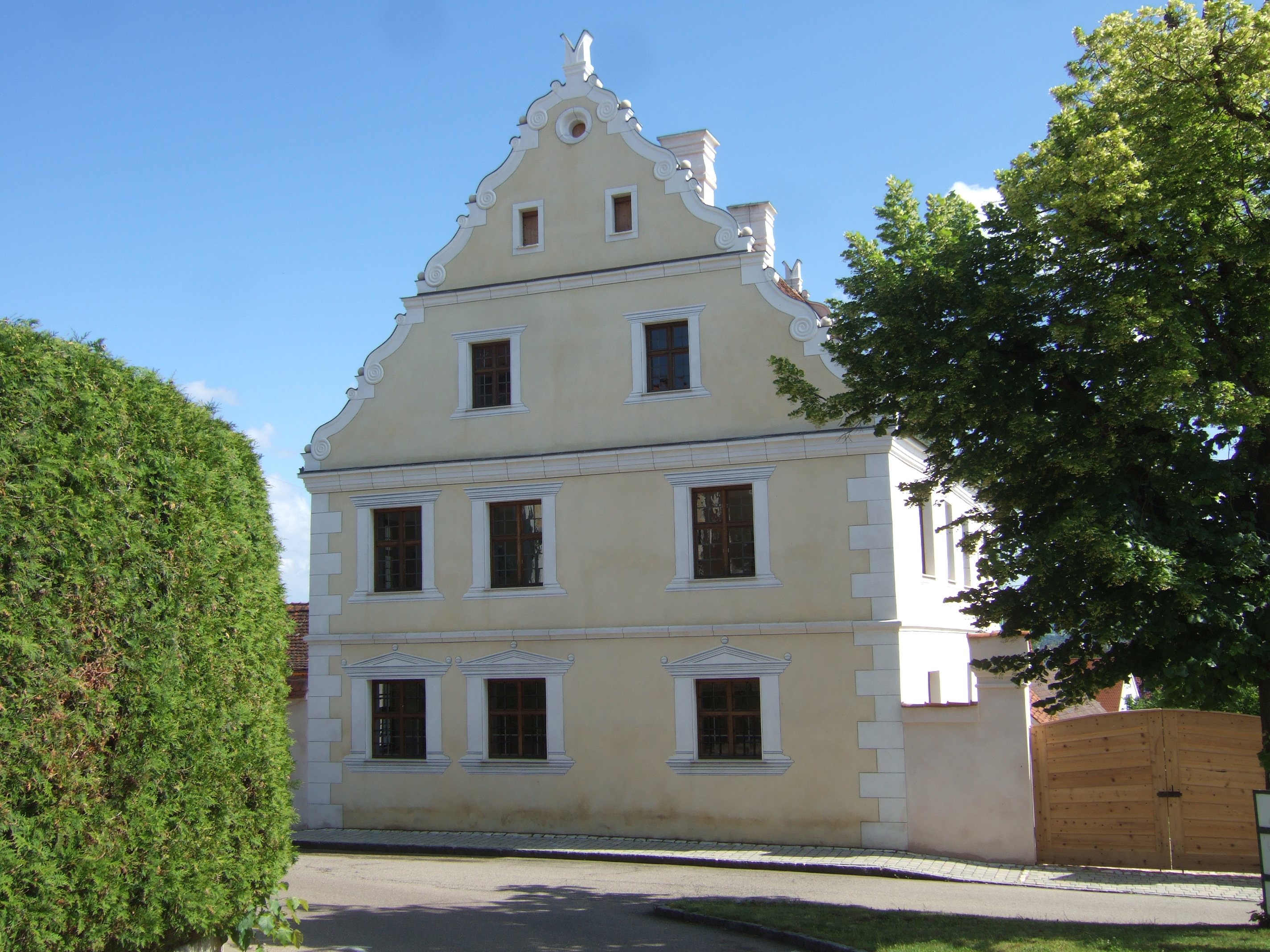
- Von Jan House

- Coat of arms

- Location of Wallerstein within Donau-Ries district
- Interactive map of Wallerstein
- Location within Germany Location within Bavaria
- Coordinates: 48°53′N 10°26′E
- Country: Germany
- State: Bavaria
- Admin. region: Schwaben
- District: Donau-Ries
- Municipal assoc.: Wallerstein

Government
  - Mayor (2023–29): Georg Stoller

Area
  - Total: 19.44 km^{2} (7.51 sq mi)
- Elevation: 441 m (1,447 ft)

Population (2025-12-31)
  - Total: 3,399
  - Density: 174.8/km^{2} (452.8/sq mi)
- Time zone: UTC+01:00 (CET)
  - Summer (DST): UTC+02:00 (CEST)
- Postal codes: 86757
- Dialling codes: 09081
- Vehicle registration: DON
- Website: www.markt-wallerstein.de

Wallerstein (German pronunciation: [ˈvalɐʃtaɪn]) is a municipality and former principality in the district of Donau-Ries in Bavaria in Germany.

It was first mentioned in 1238 as Steinheim. For generations ruled by the House of Oettingen-Wallerstein, in 1806 Wallerstein became part of the Kingdom of Bavaria by the process of mediatisation. The family still owns the Wallerstein Castle and its surrounding land.

== Mayors ==
- 1972-2002: Manfred Schürer
- since 2002: Joseph Mayer

== Culture and Sights ==
- Castle Wallerstein
- Castle rock
- Old Jewish burial ground
- One of only three German Marian and Holy Trinity columns

=== Gallery ===
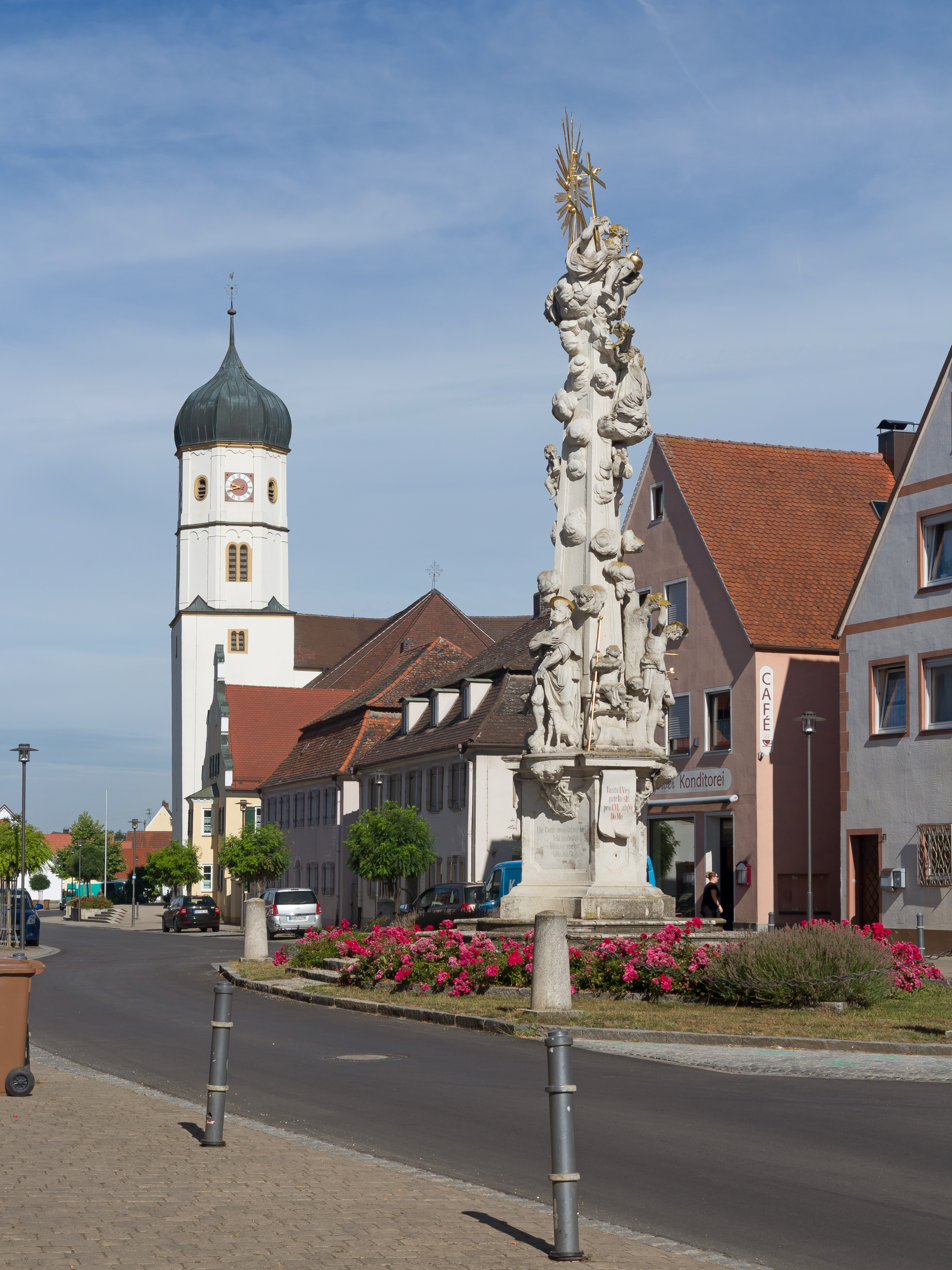
Wallerstein, monument (die Pestsäule) and Catholic Parish Church of Saint Alban

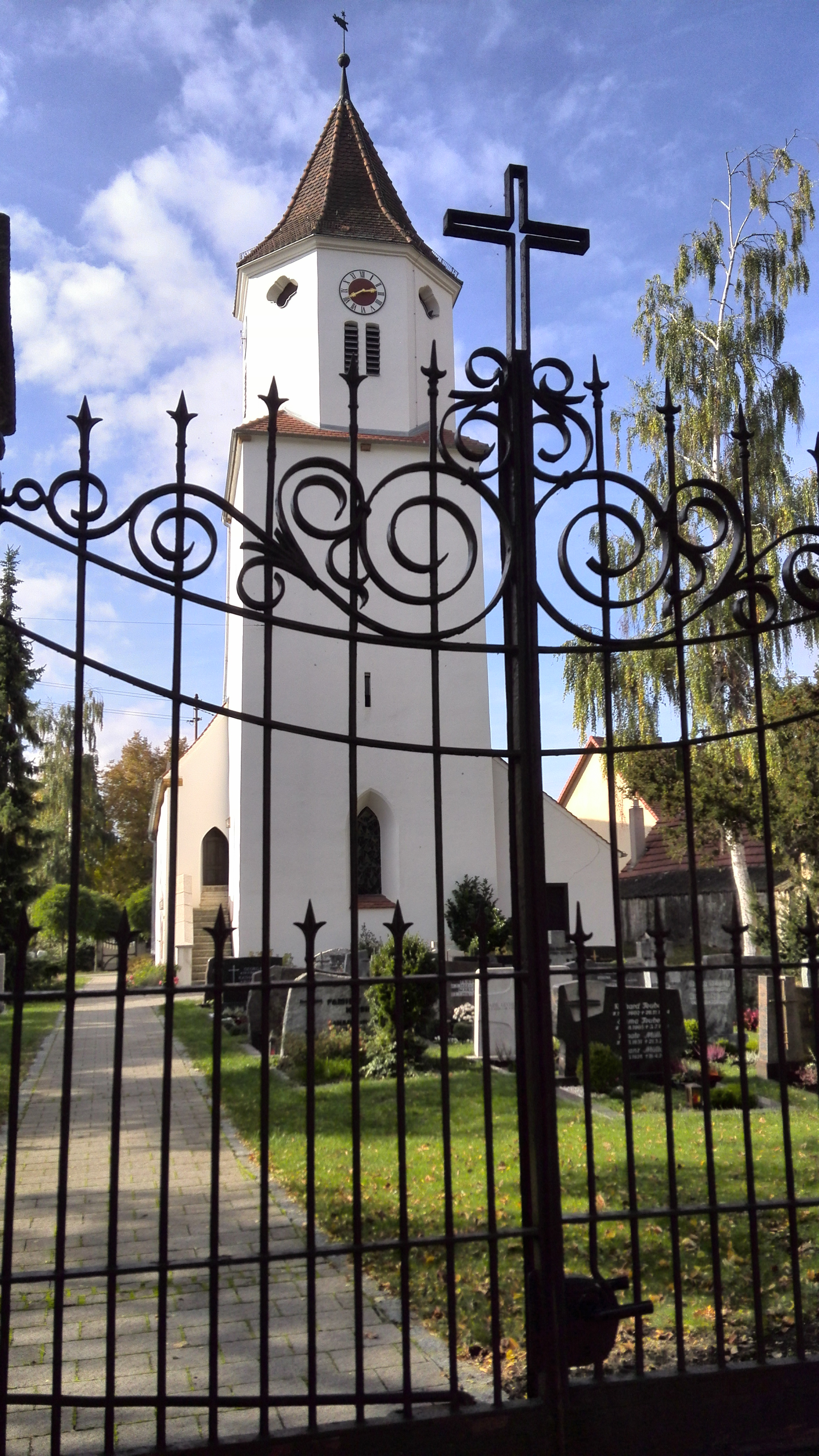
St. Oswald Church

== Notable inhabitants ==
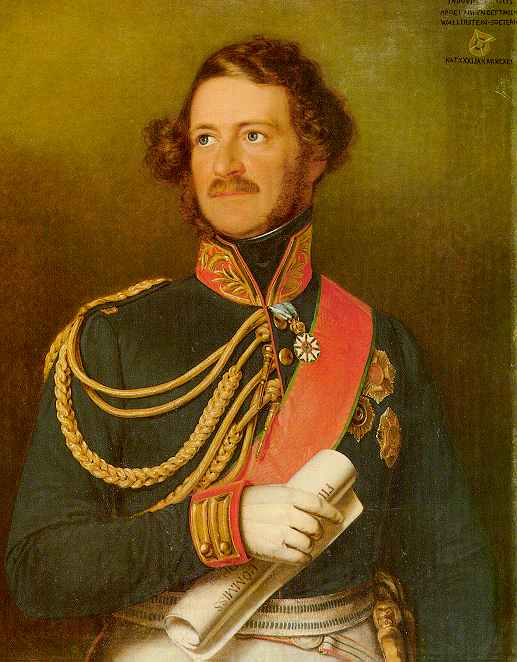
Ludwig, Prince of Oettingen-Wallerstein

- Yom-Tov Lipmann Heller (1579-1654), born in Wallerstein and later Rabbi of Prague, Nemirow and Krakow. He published a three-volume Mishnah commentary which is studied to this day.
- Louis of Oettingen-Wallerstein (1791-1870), Bavarian statesman and prince
- William Berczy (1744-1813), painter, colonist and architect, co-founder of Toronto
- German General Theodor Busse
- Bernhard Mettenleiter (1822-1901), organist and composer

== See also ==
- Synagogues of the Swabian type (Wallerstein)
