= Oettingen in Bayern =

- Town
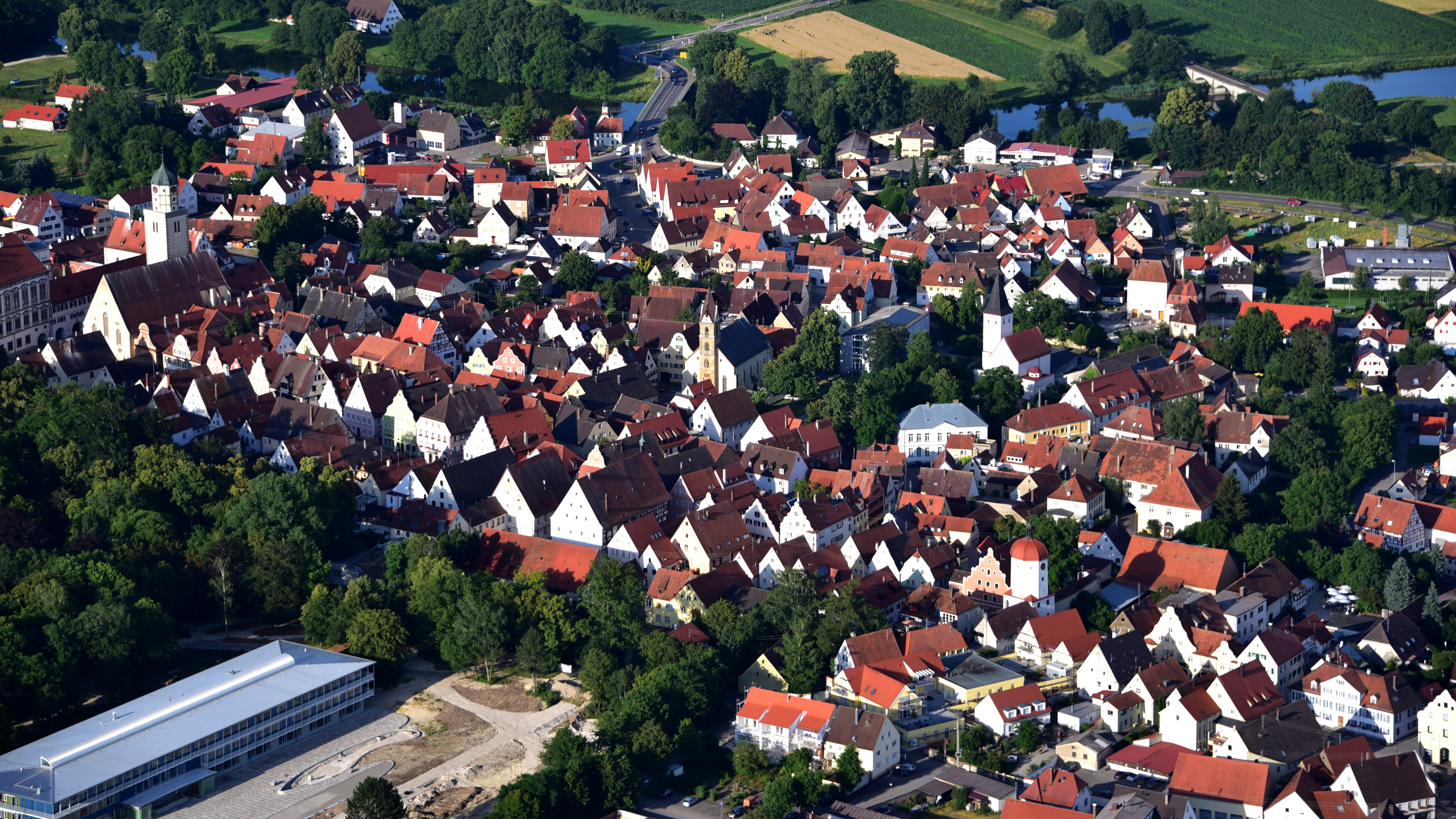
- Aerial view

- Coat of arms

- Location of Oettingen in Bayern within Donau-Ries district
- Interactive map of Oettingen in Bayern
- Location within Germany Location within Bavaria
- Coordinates: 48°57′N 10°35′E
- Country: Germany
- State: Bavaria
- Admin. region: Swabia
- District: Donau-Ries
- Municipal assoc.: Oettingen in Bayern
- Subdivisions: 5 Stadtteile

Government
  - Mayor (2020–26): Thomas Heydecker (SPD)

Area
  - Total: 34.22 km^{2} (13.21 sq mi)
- Elevation: 419 m (1,375 ft)

Population (2025-12-31)
  - Total: 5,189
  - Density: 151.6/km^{2} (392.7/sq mi)
- Time zone: UTC+01:00 (CET)
  - Summer (DST): UTC+02:00 (CEST)
- Postal codes: 86729–86732
- Dialling codes: 09082
- Vehicle registration: DON, NÖ
- Website: www.oettingen.de

Oettingen in Bayern (German pronunciation: [ˈœtɪŋən ʔɪn ˈbaɪɐn], lit. 'Oettingen in Bavaria'; Alemannic German: Eade) is a town in the Donau-Ries district, in Swabia, Bavaria, Germany. It is situated 29 km (18 mi) northwest of Donauwörth, and 14 km (8.7 mi) northeast of Nördlingen.

== Geography ==
The town is located on the river Wörnitz, a tributary of the Danube, and lies on the northern edge of the Nördlinger Ries, a meteorite crater 25 km (16 mi) in diameter.

The town consists of the municipalities of Erlbach, Heuberg, Lehmingen, Niederhofen, Nittingen and Oettingen.

== Industry ==
The Oettinger Brewery, which make Germany's best-selling brand of beer, has its main brewery and headquarters in Oettingen.

== History ==
Neolithic remains indicate that the region was already settled by around 5000 BC. Archaeologists have also discovered the remains of a Bronze Age settlement and a Roman village.

The old town centre has a highly unusual aspect; while the eastern side of the main street and market place is baroque, the western side is half-timbered. From 1522 to 1731, the town was split between the Protestant house of Oettingen-Oettingen and the Roman Catholic house of Oettingen-Wallerstein, which built the baroque facades. As well as one side of the street being Protestant and the other side being Catholic, one side used the Julian calendar, and the other side used the Gregorian calendar. Each side also had its own synagogue.

Unlike nearby Dinkelsbühl, which survived World War II unscathed, Oettingen was severely damaged on 23 February 1945 by an Allied bombing raid, part of Operation Clarion, in which 48 aircraft dropped some 500 bombs on the town, killing 199 persons.

== Culture and points of interest ==
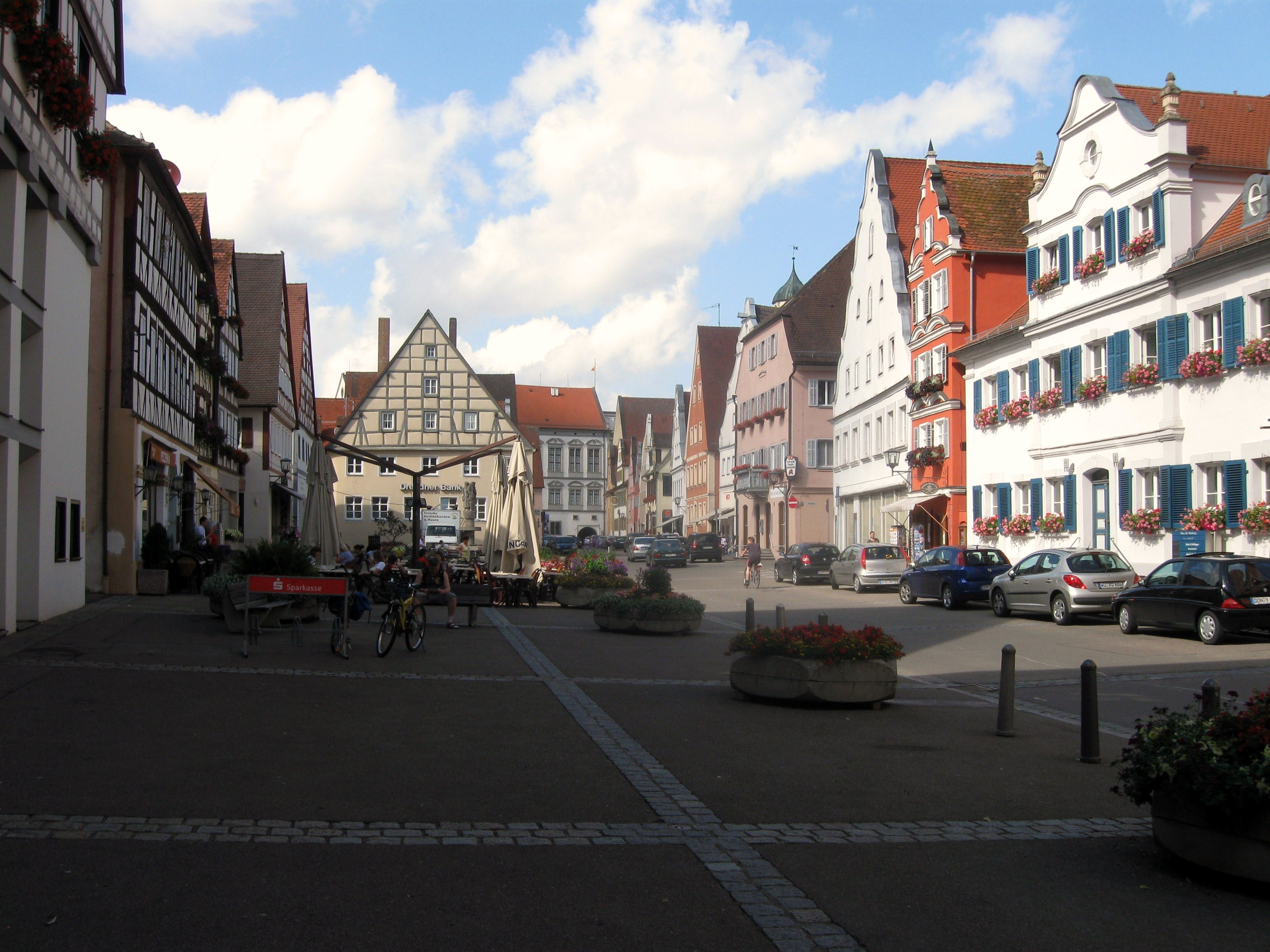
The Marktplatz in July 2009

=== Schloss Oettingen ===
The Oettingen Castle, home to the Princes of Oettingen-Spielberg, is in the center of the city.

=== Königsturm (King's Tower) ===
The tower of the lower gate, the so-called King's Tower, is the only one along the city fortifications to have been preserved. The lower outskirts used to be located on the outside, and were secluded by an exterior lower gate. The lower level still exhibits remains of the tower from the 13th century. The city governors together with the citizens constructed a new tower in 1594–96. Cells from the city jail remain on the inside.

=== Rathaus (City Hall) ===
The city hall is one of the most outstanding examples of the Swabian Half-timbered (Ger. Fachwerk) style. The stone entry level and portal were built in 1431, while the upper floors and the impressive roof framework come from 1480. The nearby civic house from the 17th century was connected to the city hall during renovations (1986–93). The city hall today is the seat of municipal government and governing body of Oettingen, and the city license bureau is found on the ground floor.

=== Marktplatz (Marketplace) ===
The marketplace forms the centre of Oettingen, and the weekly farmers' market takes place here on Fridays. Worth noting is the architectural layout: on the east side, the gables are Baroque, and on the west side, they are half-timbered.

=== The Storks of Oettingen ===
Storks have been nesting in Oettingen at least since the time of Count Ludwig XVI (more than 400 years ago), and Ludwig was supposedly a friend of the storks. According to legend, when the count left the town after the Schmalkaldic War, the storks also moved away and did not come back. Much later, in 1563 when the count came back, the storks, too, returned to the town and have remained there to this day.

=== Altes Gymnasium (Old High School) ===
The building was built in 1724 under the direction of Albert Ernest II by Johann Christian Lüttich. It accommodated the Latin School which was established in 1563, and served to educate the children of the parish and of the city governors.

== Notable people ==
- Marco Seefried (born 1976), racing driver
- Rainer Stadelmann (1933 – 2019), Egyptologist
- Hieronymus Wolf (1516 — 1580), Historian & Humanist

== See also ==
- County of Oettingen
