= Stairway to Heaven (disambiguation) =

"Stairway to Heaven" is a song released by English rock group Led Zeppelin in 1971.

Stairway to Heaven may also refer to:

== Music ==
- "Stairway to Heaven" (Pure Soul song), a 1996 R&B song by Pure Soul
- "Stairway to Heaven" (Neil Sedaka song), a Top 10 pop hit by Neil Sedaka in 1960
- "Stairway to Heaven", a song by the O'Jays from their album Family Reunion
- "Stairway to Heaven," a song by Be Your Own Pet
- "Stairway to Heaven," a song by Sabaton
- Stairway to Heaven, a 2017 tribute album to D'erlanger

== Film and television ==
- Stairway to Heaven, the U.S. alternative title for the 1946 British film A Matter of Life and Death, also the title of radio, television and theatrical adaptations of the film
- Stairway to Heaven (2007 film), a documentary film by André Singer
- Stairway to Heaven (South Korean TV series), a 2003–2004 South Korean television series
- Stairway to Heaven (Philippine TV series), a 2009–2010 Philippine television series based on the South Korean drama of the same name
- "Stairway to Heaven", an episode of the anime series Black Heaven
- "Stairway to Heaven", the first episode of the series First Person
- "Stairway to Heaven", a fifth-season episode of Grey's Anatomy
- The Crow: Stairway to Heaven, a 1998–1999 Canadian television series

== Places ==
- The Haiku Stairs, a mountain trail in Hawaii also known as "the Stairway to Heaven"
- The Kamuning Footbridge, a 9-meter (30 ft) tall pedestrian footbridge in Quezon City, Philippines which has been nicknamed as a "stairway to heaven" due to its unusually steep height and appearance
- Escalera al Cielo (Stairway to Heaven), a steep mountain trail leading to an ancient Mayan site in Kiuic, Yucatan in Mexico
- A 17-kilometre-long mountain route in Ras al-Khaimah, United Arab Emirates, once linking the coast with a mountain village
- A 7.5-kilometre-long mountain route in Cuilcagh, on the Cavan and Fermanagh border in Ireland

== Other uses ==
- Stairway to Heaven: Led Zeppelin Uncensored, a book by Richard Cole documenting his experience as Led Zeppelin's tour manager
- The Stairway to Heaven, a book by Zecharia Sitchin
- Stairway to Heaven, a title given to the Blessed Virgin Mary in the Litany of Loreto
- "Stairway to Heaven", a 2017 memorial outside Bethnal Green tube station, London, commemorating the 1943 disaster in which 173 people died

== See also ==
- Heaven's Stairway (1998–2006), an Eastern Canadian cannabis seedbank
- Jacob's Ladder, a stairway to Heaven described in the Book of Genesis
- Stairway to Hell (disambiguation)
- Stairway to Heaven/Highway to Hell, a 1989 compilation album featuring bands that performed at the Moscow Music Peace Festival
- Stairways to Heaven, a compilation album of covers of the Led Zeppelin song which appeared on the Australian television program The Money or the Gun
- Sullam al-sama', an early 15th-century Persian astronomical treatise whose title can be translated as Stairway of Heaven
