= Otting =

- Municipality
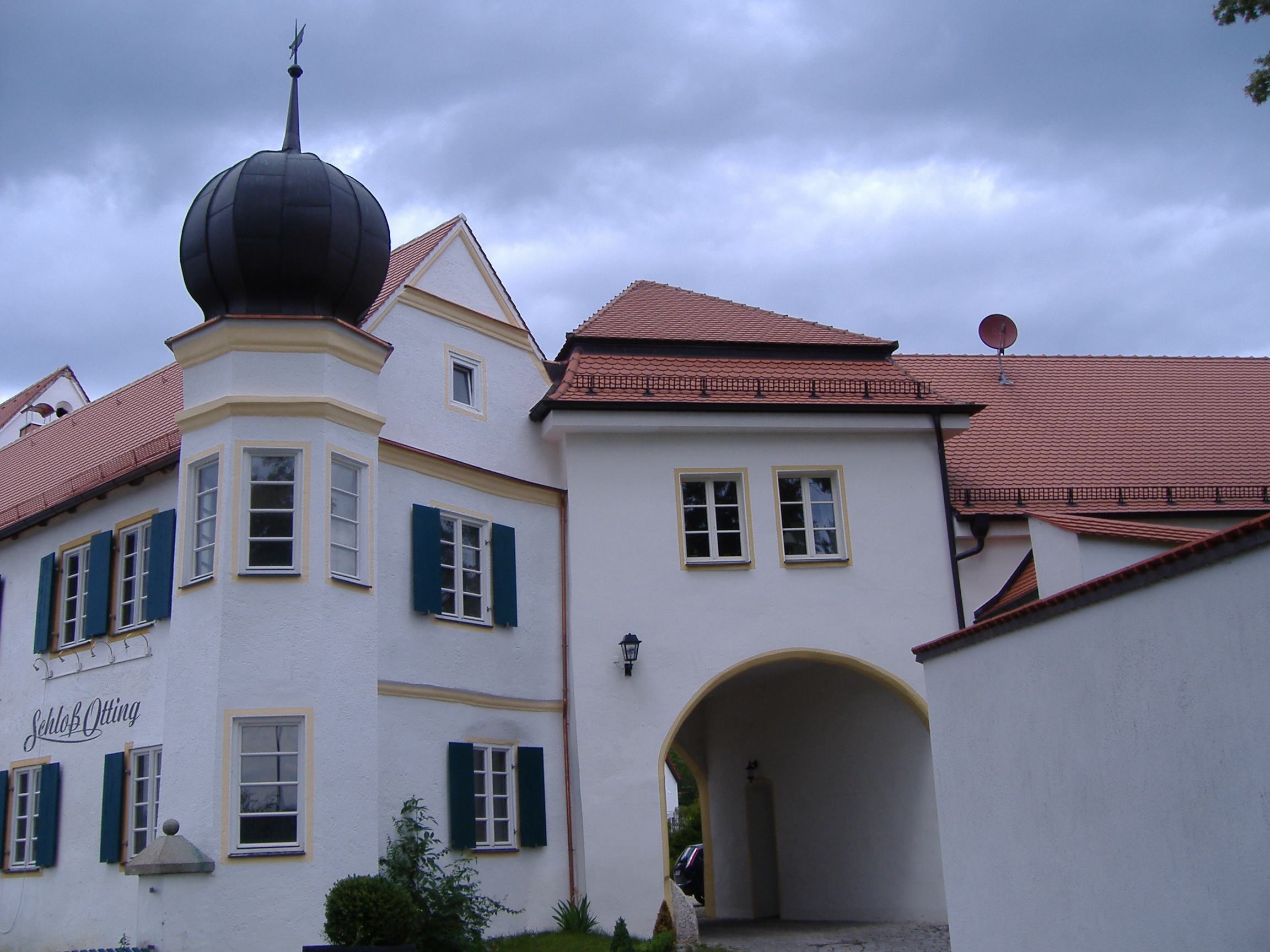
- Otting Castle

- Coat of arms

- Location of Otting within Donau-Ries district
- Interactive map of Otting
- Location within Germany Location within Bavaria
- Coordinates: 48°53′N 10°48′E
- Country: Germany
- State: Bavaria
- Admin. region: Schwaben
- District: Donau-Ries
- Municipal assoc.: Wemding

Government
  - Mayor (2020–26): Wolfgang Lechner (FW)

Area
  - Total: 13.39 km^{2} (5.17 sq mi)
- Elevation: 492 m (1,614 ft)

Population (2025-12-31)
  - Total: 793
  - Density: 59.2/km^{2} (153/sq mi)
- Time zone: UTC+01:00 (CET)
  - Summer (DST): UTC+02:00 (CEST)
- Postal codes: 86700
- Dialling codes: 09092
- Vehicle registration: DON
- Website: www.gemeinde-otting.de

Otting (German pronunciation: [ˈɔtɪŋ]) is a municipality in the district of Donau-Ries in Bavaria in Germany.

The village is located between Augsburg and Nuremberg, about 5 km east of Wemding and about 6 km west of Monheim.

== Mayors ==
- Rupert Felber, 1945–1946 (CSU),
- Kaspar Waidhaußer, 1946–1952 (CSU),
- Kaspar Rupp, 1952–1956 (CSU),
- Karl Häfelein, 1956–1984 (CSU),
- Wolfgang Seefried, 1984–1990 (Free voters),
- Walter Bayerle, 1990–2002 (Free voters),
- Johann Bernreuther, 2002–2020
- Wolfgang Lechner, since 2020
