= Monheim =

Monheim may refer to:

== Music ==
- A movement on the 2000 post-rock album Lift Yr. Skinny Fists Like Antennas to Heaven by Godspeed You Black Emperor!

== Places ==
- Monheim am Rhein, in the Mettmann district, North Rhine-Westphalia
- Monheim, Bavaria, in the Donau-Ries district, Bavaria
  - Monheim Town Hall, the town hall of Monheim, Bavaria

== People ==
- Jonah Monheim (born 2002), American football player
