= Monheim Town Hall =

- Monheimer Rathaus
- The building in September 2026

General information
- Type: Town hall
- Architectural style: Baroque
- Location: Monheim, Germany
- Coordinates: 48°50′N 10°50′E
- Construction started: 1714
- Completed: 1720
- Cost: Baroque
- Client: Abraham Elias Model
- Owner: Town of Monheim

Technical details
- Floor count: Three

Monheim Town Hall (German Monheimer Rathaus) is a historical building in Monheim, Bavaria, Germany, now owned by the city's council.

The building, constructed from 1714 to 1720 for a rich Jewish merchant, the Court Jew Abraham Elias Model, is most notable for its ceilings, displaying motifs from the Tanakh (Hebrew Bible) which were restored in 1978 and 1994 respectively.

== History ==
=== The Jewish community ===
The Jewish community in Monheim was established in 1697, when Duke Johann Wilhelm allowed six Jewish families which had been banned from Eichstätt, to settle in Monheim. The new community was allowed to acquire property in Monheim, to construct a Synagogue and to work as merchants in town. In the following years, the community grew considerably, numbering 19 families and 150 people by 1737.

The prospering community however raised concerns with the local population, which was worried about eventually becoming outnumbered in town. In 1736, restrictions were passed, allowing only a limited number of weddings to be conducted by the local Jews at considerable cost. In 1741, Duke Charles III Philip passed an act banning all Jews from Palatinate-Neuburg. By the 31 July 1741, all Jews had to leave his lands and were only permitted to take with them what they could carry. No financial compensation was made for their loss of property. The Jews from Monheim left for the towns in the region not part of Palatinate-Neuburg and their origin from Monheim remains obvious through the surname Monheim or Monheimer.

=== The town hall ===
The location of the current town hall was acquired by Abraham Elias Model in 1712 from Ferdinand Kugler for 1,025 Gulden. The later owned a brewery and guest house at the spot, called Gasthaus zur Rose. Model had the old building demolished and commissioned a new building to be constructed, which was erected between 1714 and 1720.

The new building, which was referred to in the local town chronicles as "very precious", was built in Baroque style. It was a square three-story building which was richly decorated, especially the ceilings. The main room on the second floor, now the council chambers, depict Abraham being prevented by the angel from sacrificing Isaac, with a text in Hebrew from the Book of Genesis.

The ceiling, long hidden, was only restored in 1978. Two more ceilings, also on the second floor, were restored in 1994. One depicts Moses receiving the Ten Commandments while the other shows King David playing the harp.

For a time it was assumed that the house also functioned as a synagogue, Monheim having had a Rabbi since 1715, but this has since been disproven. Nothing is left of the former synagogue, which was located in the nearby building that later became the guest house Zum Ochsen.

With the forced departure of the Jews in 1741, the building came into non-Jewish, private possession. In 1853, it was acquired by the town from the brewer Anton Wunderlich, to be used as a school house. For this purpose, the chamber that is now the main council chamber was subdivided into two rooms. The rooms were nevertheless insufficient to house all pupils and a separate building was constructed from 1892 to 1895 to house the school boys, while the girls stayed at the town hall. Eventually, two more, larger schools were completed, one in 1957 and 1976. With the completion of the later, the town hall ceased to be required for schooling purposes.

The ceilings on the second floor can be visited free of charge during the opening hours of the town hall, provided no marriages or council meetings take place in the rooms at the time.

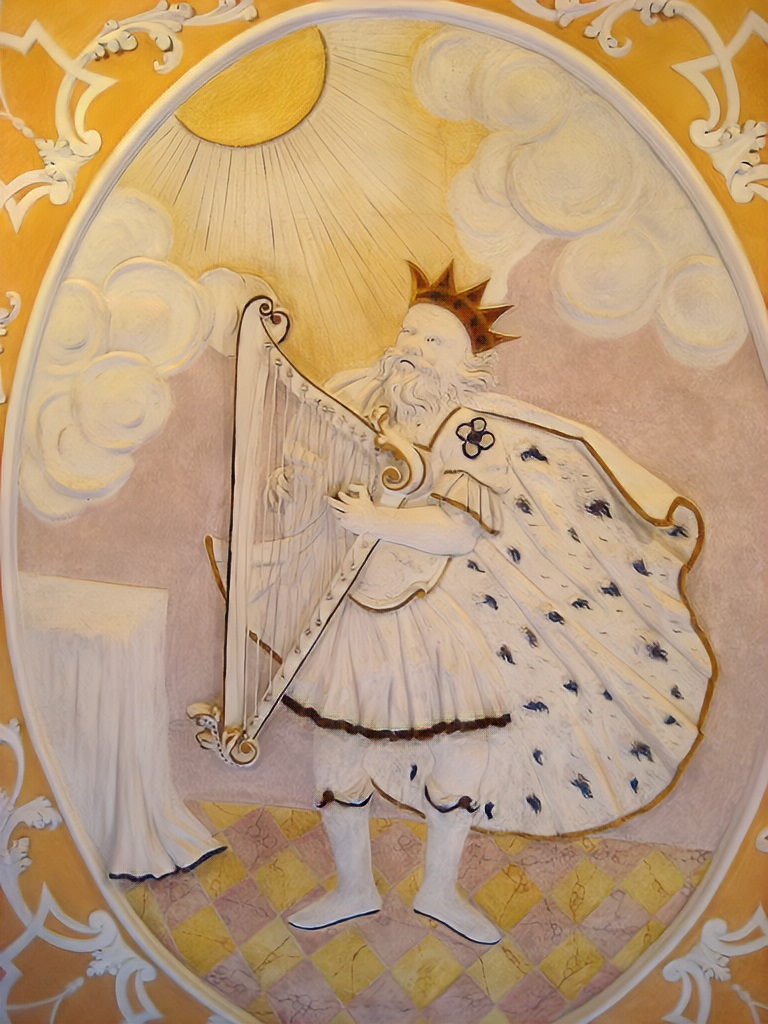
Ceiling of the main council chamber: King David playing the harp.

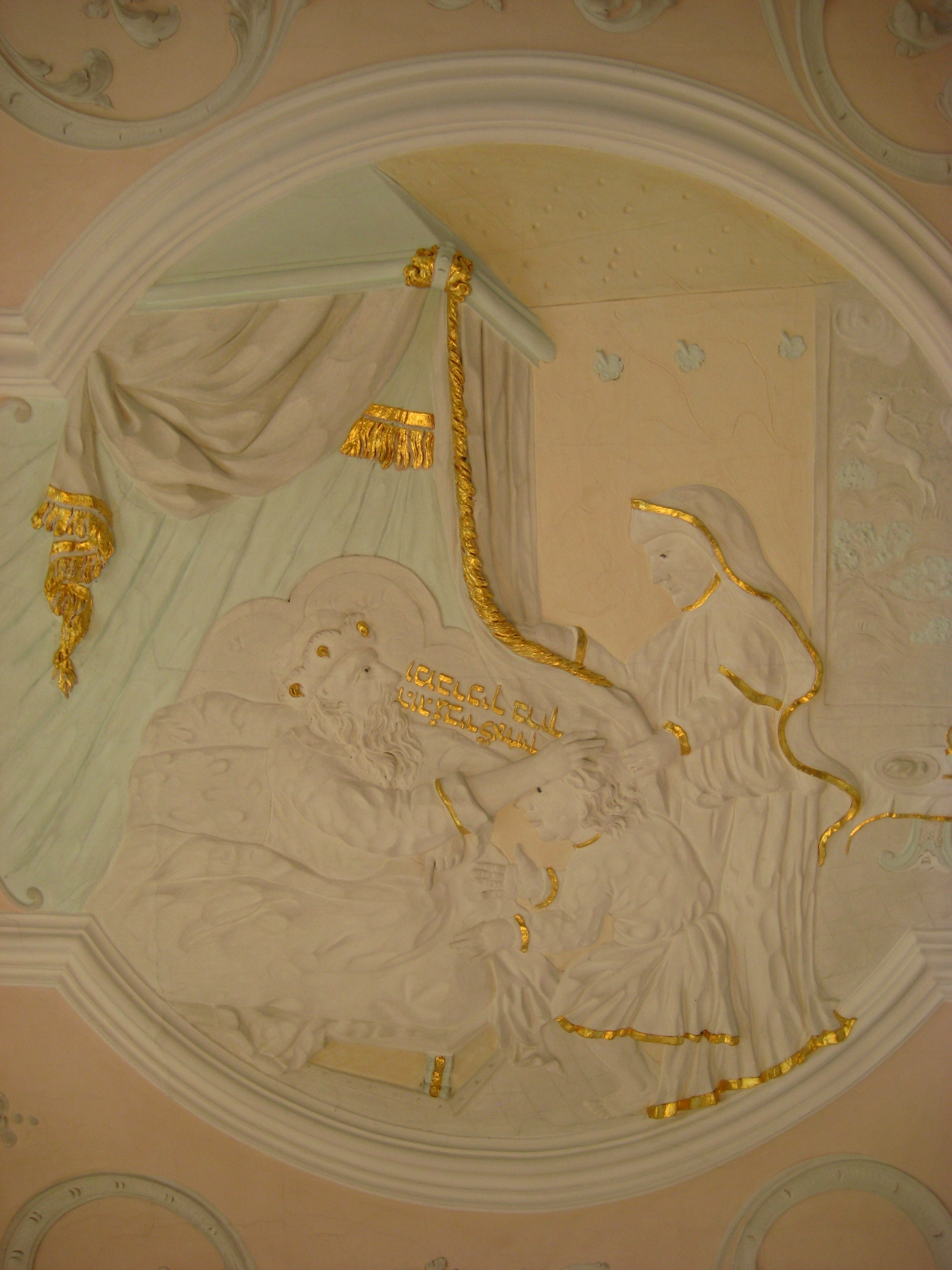
Ceiling of the main council chamber: Isaac blessing Jacob.

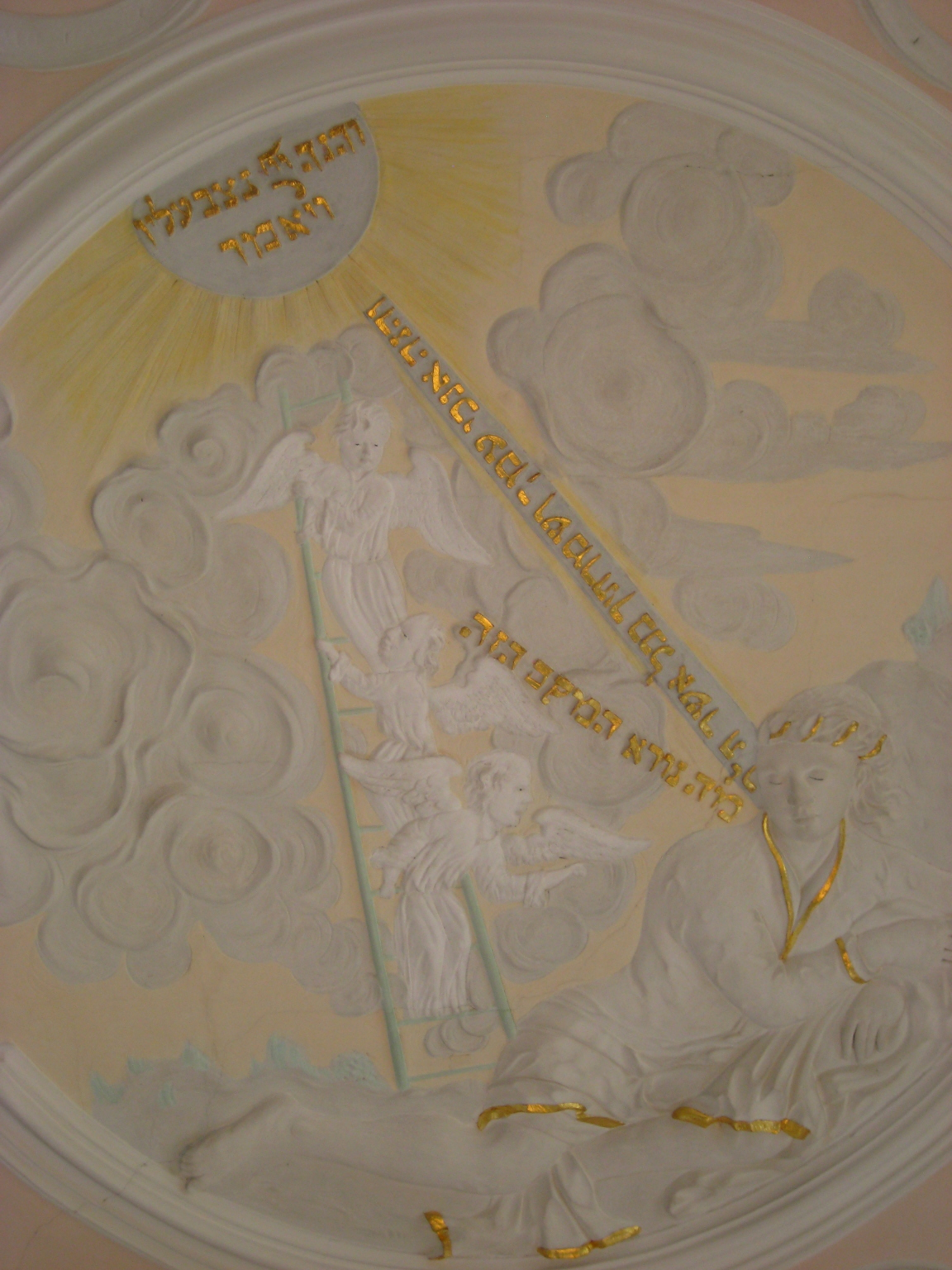
Ceiling of the main council chamber: Jacob dreaming of the ladder to heaven.

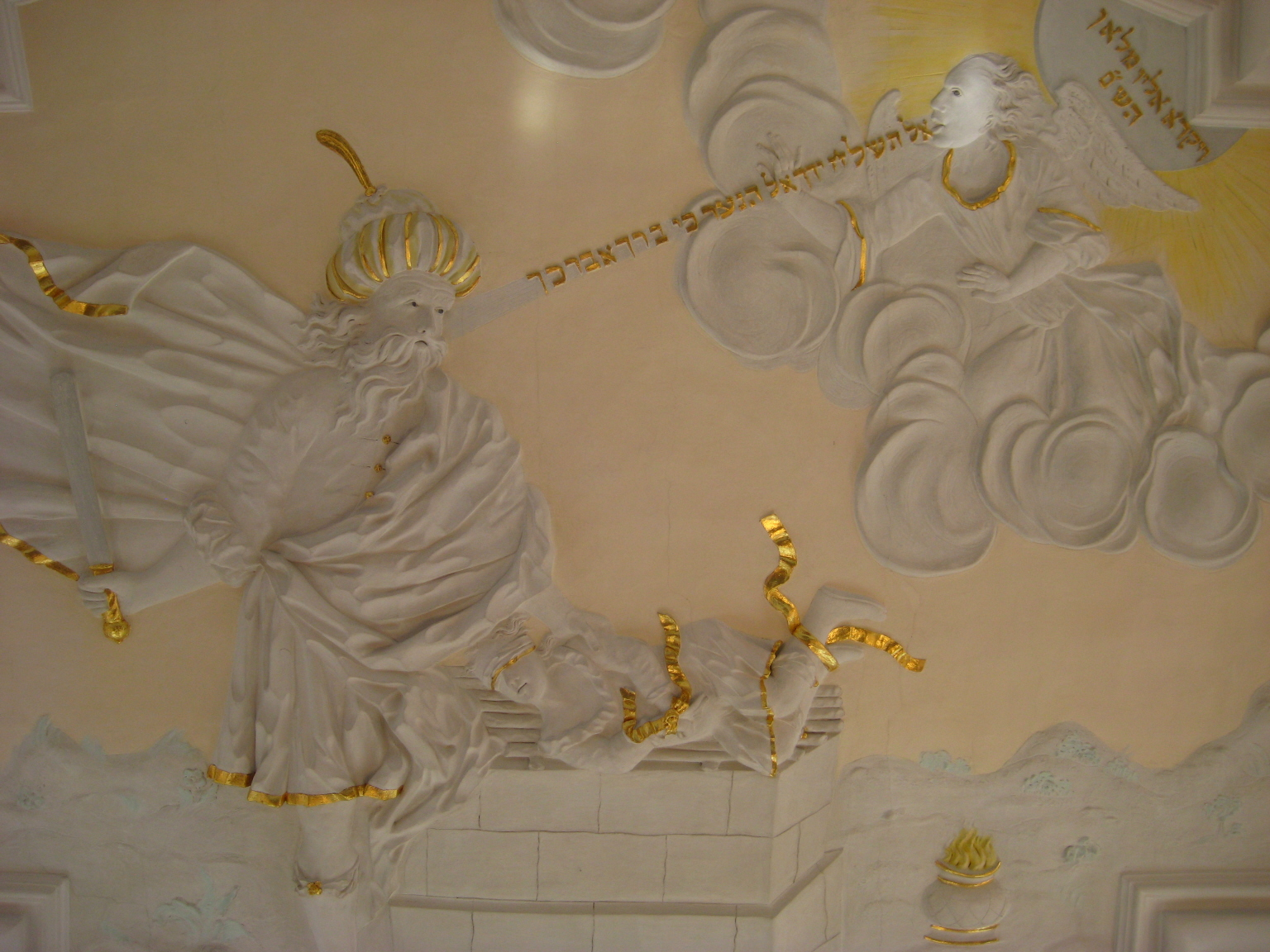
Ceiling of the main council chamber: Abraham, Isaac and the angel.

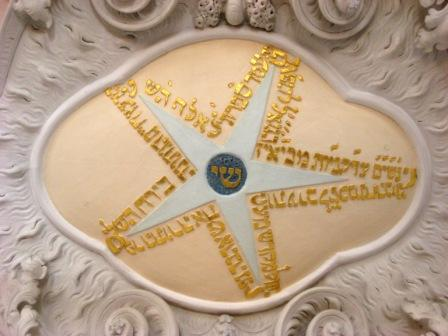
Ceiling of the main council chamber: Scripture on Etz Chaim - the Tree of life.

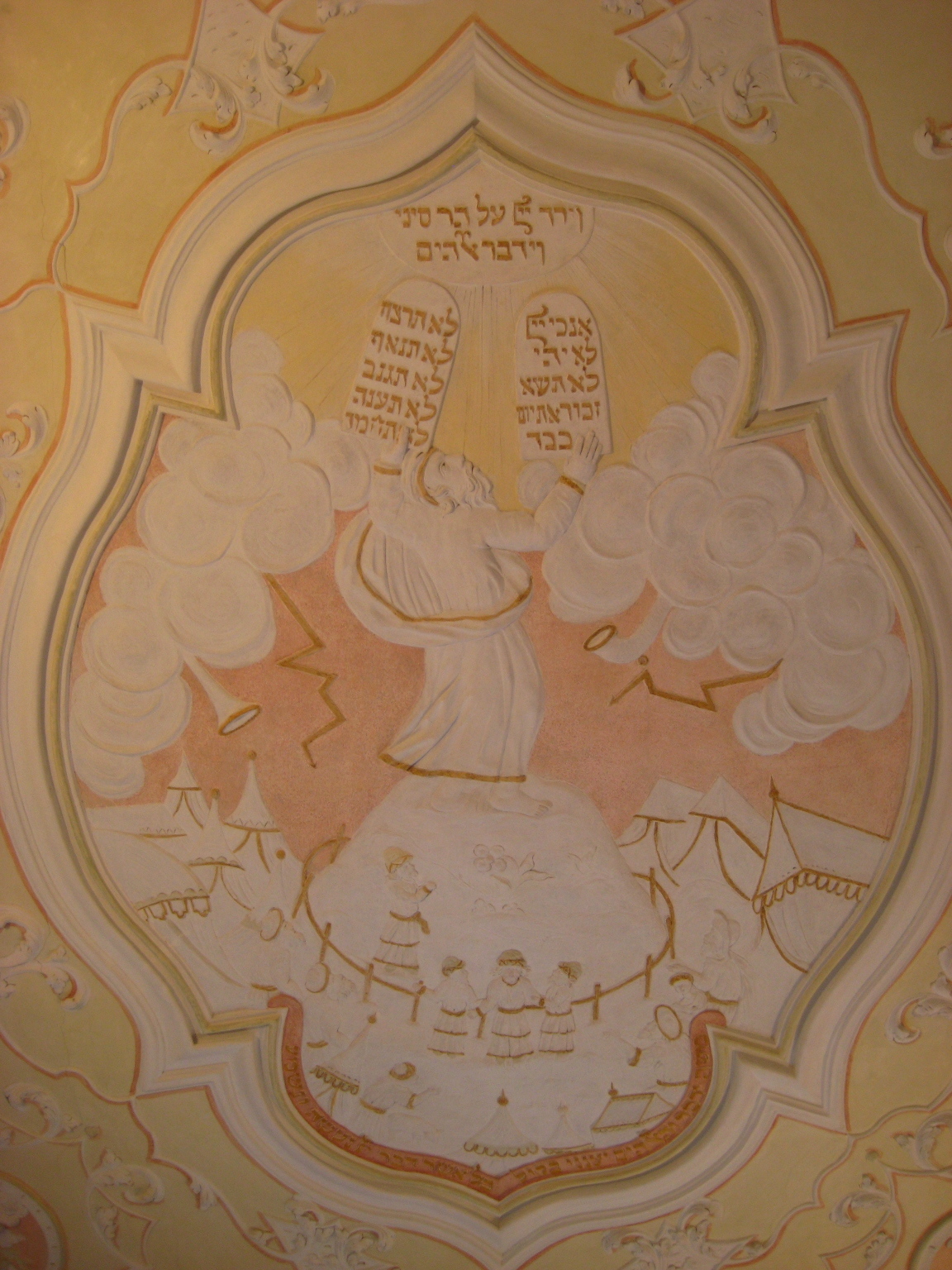
Ceiling of the small council chamber: Moses receiving the Ten Commandments.

== Sources ==
- (in German) Various authors: Monheim - Kleine Stadt mit grosser Vergangenheit, (English: Monheim - Little town with a big history), publisher: Stadt Monheim, published: 1990
- (in German) Aaron Friedmann (1855–1936): Die Geschichte der Juden in Monheim (English: The history of the Jews in Monheim), Publisher: Blätter für jüdische Geschichte und Literatur, published: 1902, publisher: Separatdruck Mainz, Leo Baeck Institute, New York City, Location: DS 135 G4 M67 F74
- (in German) Christian Bernreuther: Die Synagoge der Juden in Monheim, (English: The Jewish Synagogue in Monheim), published in: Heimatklänge (part of the local newspaper for Wemding and Monheim), published: 31 October 1932
