= Veit Amerbach =

German theologian, scholar and humanist

Veit Amerbach (also Vitus Amerpachius) (1503 in Wemding, Germany – September 13, 1557, in Ingolstadt, Germany) was a German Lutheran theologian, scholar and humanist, who converted to Catholicism.

== Life ==
Amerbach was born at Wembdinden in 1503. Up to age of 14 he attended the Latin School at Weth in his hometown of Wemding and then went to study at the University of Ingolstadt. On July 7, 1521, he enrolled at the University of Freiburg. In the following year, he moved to the University of Wittenberg, where he met the reformer Martin Luther and the humanist Philipp Melanchthon, which shaped his future. Through the mediation of Luther in 1528 he became a teacher at the Latin school in Eisleben, where he worked with Johannes Agricola of Eisleben. He continued his philosophical studies at the University of Wittenberg, completing them on December 12, 1529, with the degree of Magister.

In the same year, he married Elisabeth, and the couple had eleven children. From 1530 to 1532, Amerbach was in the Senate of the art department of the University of Wittenberg. In the 1538–39 winter semester he was Dean of the Faculty of Arts; he was professor at Pädagogium starting in 1529 and Professor of Physics starting in 1535. In 1541, Luther and Gregory Brück sent him to the Saxon Consistory of Wittenberg to participate in the sovereign government of the Church. With in-depth study of the church fathers, Amerbach came to a different conclusion, so that disagreements arose with Reformation ideas, particularly with regard to the doctrine of justification and of papal primacy. Then came his 1542 rebuttal of Philip Melanchthon's "Commentarius de Anima".

== Conversion to Roman Catholicism ==
After much controversial correspondence with Melancthon, he left Wittenberg in 1543, and was received back into the Catholic Church, along with his wife and children. The Prince-Bishop Maurice von Hutten made him professor of rhetoric at Eichstätt. A year later, he went to Ingolstadt as professor of philosophy, where he remained until his death on 13 September 1557. At the University of Ingolstadt, he lectured on Aristotelian philosophy and rhetoric. Soon he enjoyed a widespread reputation as a commentator on Horace and Cicero; he also tried his hand at poetry, likewise in Latin. During his many years of teaching in Ingolstadt, he was also committed to an equality with the rest of the philosophical faculties.

Veit Amerbach was buried inside the parochial church of Our Lady in Ingolstadt.

== Works ==
- Oratio de doctoratu philosophico, in: V. Rotmar, Tome I orationum Ingolstadiensium. Ingolstadt 1571, sheet 351
- Three letters from Amerbach to Julius Pflug 1548/49, in: Ch G. Müller, P. Epistolae Mosellani etc. ... ad Julium Pflugium ... 1802, page 119-125
- Neulat. Poems in: Deliciae Poetarum Germanorum, 4 vols, Frankfurt 1612: http://www.uni-mannheim.de/mateo/camena/del1/books/deliciae1_7.html
- Quatuor Libri de anima, 4 Books, 1542 (rebuttal to Philipp Melanchthon Commentarius De Anima, 1540).

A humanist scholar, he wrote learned works, including:

- Commentaries on Cicero and Horace;
- Antiparadoxa, with autobiographical content, and
- Tres Epistolae, on the ecclesiastical controversies of the period.

Detailed directory in:

- Wetzer and Welte's Church Dictionary or Encyclopedia of Catholic theology and its auxiliary sciences. Second Edition, Volume I, 1882, pages 709-711.
- Christian Gottlieb Jöcher : General scholarly lexicon. Volume 1, 1750, page 341.
- Johann Christoph Adelung : Continuation and additions to Christian Gottlieb Jöcher's general scholar-Lexico. Volume 1, 1784, page 722.

== Literature ==
- Winfried Trusen: http://bsbndb.bsb.lrz-muenchen.de/sfz814.html In: New German Biography (NDB). Volume 1, Cambridge University Press, London, 1953, p 248 (digitized).
- German Biographical Encyclopedia (DBE). Volume 1, 1995, page 114
- Heinz Scheible: Melanchthon's correspondence persons. Volume 11
- Heinz Kathe: The Wittenberg Faculty 1501-1817. Böhlau, Cologne 2002, ISBN 3412044024
- Frederick William Bautz : "Amerbach, Veit". In: Biographic-bibliographic church encyclopedia (BBKL). Volume 1, Bautz, Hamm 1975, M. 144-145.
- Carl Ruland "Amerbach, Veit". In: General German Biography (ADB). Volume 1, Cambridge University Press, Leipzig 1875, p 398.
- Helmar Junghans: "Directory of rectors, vice-rectors, deans, professors and preachers of the Castle Church Leucorea the summer term 1536 and winter semester 1574/75". In: Irene Dingel and Günther Wartenberg : George Major (1502-1574). A theologian of the Wittenberg Reformation. Protestant publishing house, Leipzig, 2005, ISBN 3374023320
