= Wolferstadt =

- Municipality
- Coat of arms

- Location of Wolferstadt within Donau-Ries district
- Interactive map of Wolferstadt
- Location within Germany Location within Bavaria
- Coordinates: 48°55′N 10°47′E
- Country: Germany
- State: Bavaria
- Admin. region: Schwaben
- District: Donau-Ries
- Municipal assoc.: Wemding

Government
  - Mayor (2020–26): Philipp Schlapak

Area
  - Total: 30.70 km^{2} (11.85 sq mi)
- Elevation: 495 m (1,624 ft)

Population (2025-12-31)
  - Total: 1,131
  - Density: 36.84/km^{2} (95.42/sq mi)
- Time zone: UTC+01:00 (CET)
  - Summer (DST): UTC+02:00 (CEST)
- Postal codes: 86709
- Dialling codes: 09092
- Vehicle registration: DON
- Website: www.wolferstadt.de

Wolferstadt is a municipality in the district of Donau-Ries in Bavaria in Germany.
