= Jacob's Ladder =

Ladder in Genesis joining Earth to heaven

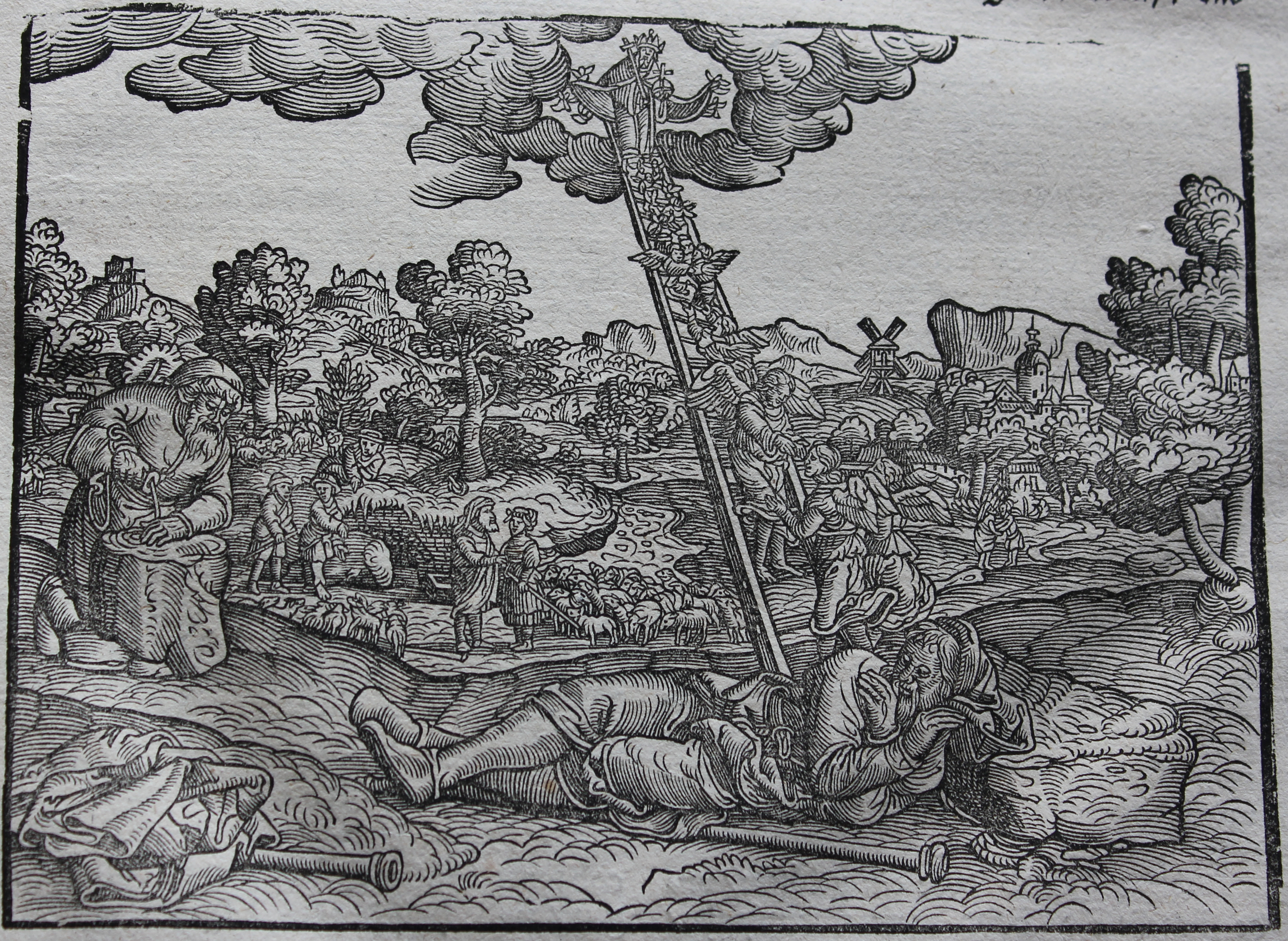
Picture of the Jacob's Ladder in the original Luther Bibles (of 1534 and also 1545)

Jacob's Ladder (Biblical Hebrew: סֻלָּם יַעֲקֹב, romanized: Sūllām Yaʿăqōv) is a ladder or staircase leading to Heaven, which featured in a dream the biblical Patriarch Jacob experienced during his flight from his brother Esau.

The story is recorded in the Book of Genesis (chapter 28). The significance of the dream has been debated, but most interpretations agree that it identified Jacob with the obligations and inheritance of the people chosen by God, as understood in Abrahamic religions.

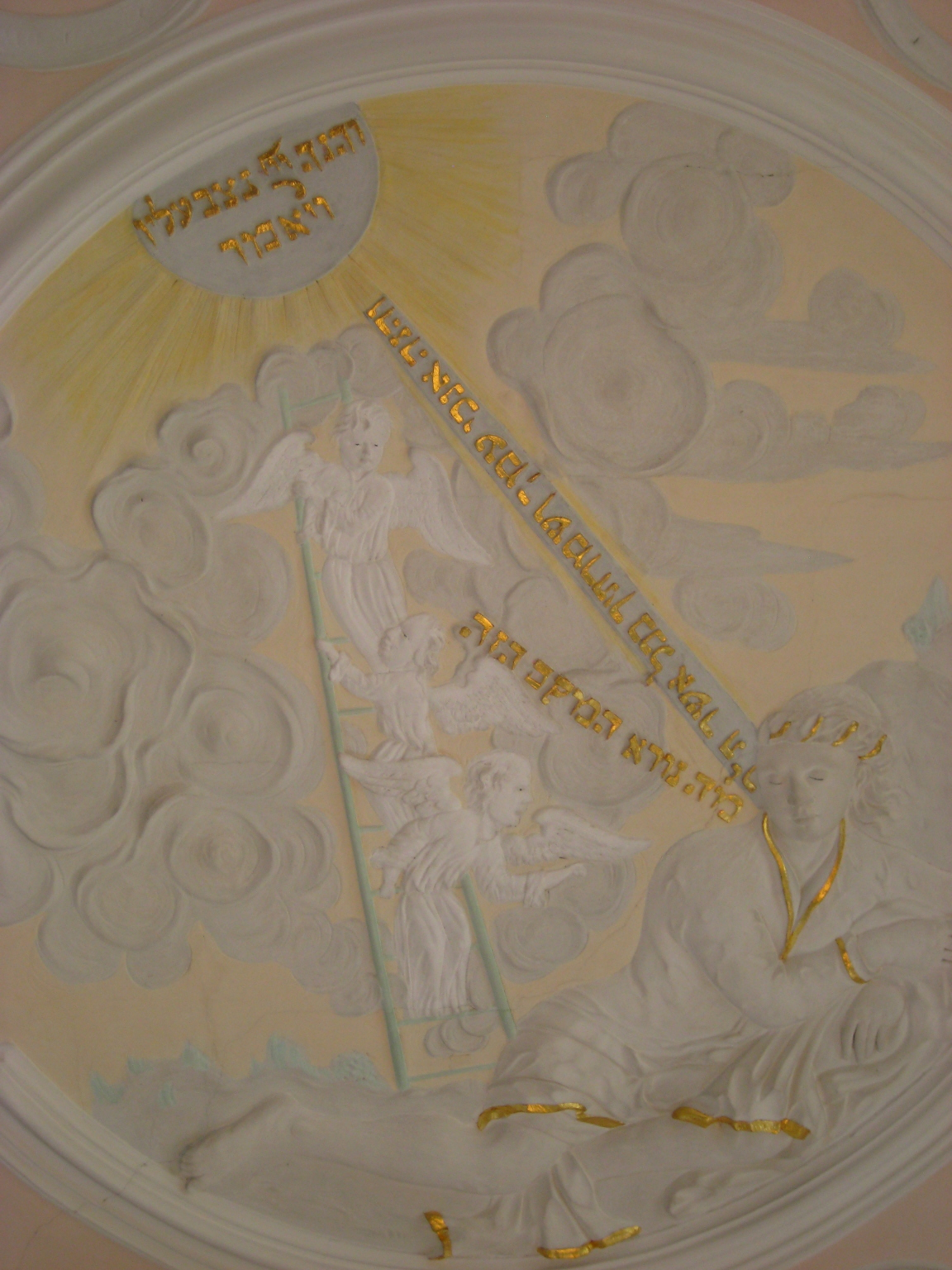
Jacob's Ladder as depicted in Monheim Town Hall. The gilded Hebrew text reads "And, behold, the LORD stood beside him, and said: 'And, behold, I am with thee, and will keep thee whithersoever thou goest'"

== Biblical narrative ==
The description of Jacob's Ladder appears in Genesis 28:10–19:

And Jacob went out from Beer-sheba, and went toward Haran. And he lighted upon the place, and tarried there all night, because the sun was set; and he took one of the stones of the place, and put it under his head, and lay down in that place to sleep. And he dreamed, and behold a ladder set up on the earth, and the top of it reached to heaven; and behold the angels of God ascending and descending on it.

And, behold, the LORD stood beside him, and said: 'I am the LORD, the God of Abraham thy father, and the God of Isaac. The land whereon thou liest, to thee will I give it, and to thy seed. And thy seed shall be as the dust of the earth, and thou shalt spread abroad to the west, and to the east, and to the north, and to the south. And in thee and in thy seed shall all the families of the earth be blessed. And, behold, I am with thee, and will keep thee whithersoever thou goest, and will bring thee back into this land; for I will not leave thee, until I have done that which I have spoken to thee of.'

And Jacob awaked out of his sleep, and he said: 'Surely the LORD is in this place; and I knew it not.' And he was afraid, and said: 'How full of awe is this place! this is none other than the house of God, and this is the gate of heaven.' And Jacob rose up early in the morning, and took the stone that he had put under his head, and set it up for a pillar, and poured oil upon the top of it. And he called the name of that place Beth-el, but the name of the city was Luz at the first.

— Genesis 28:10–19.

== Interpretations ==
=== Judaism ===
Sites associated with Jacob's Ladder

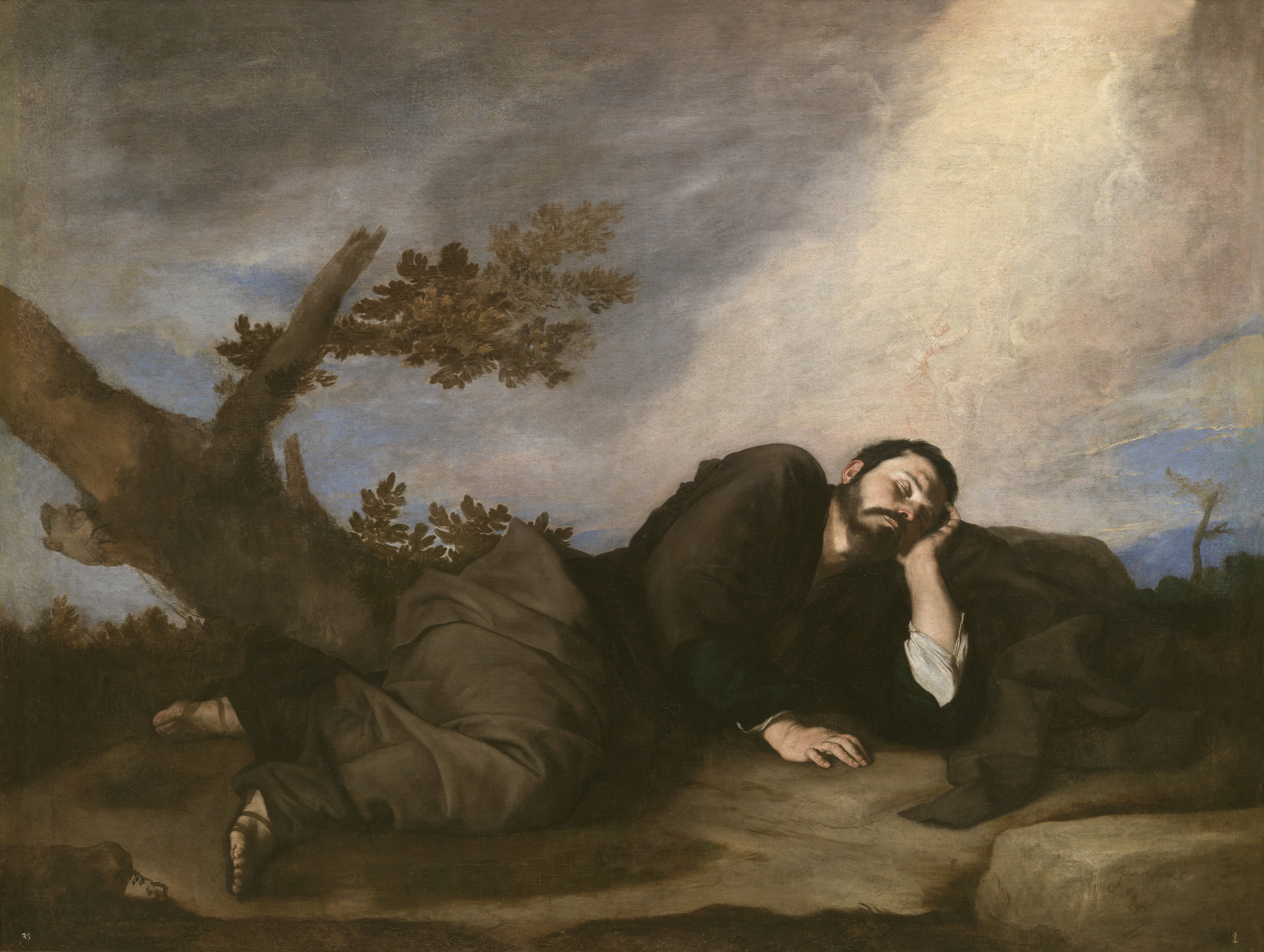
Jacob's Dream (1639) by José de Ribera, at the Museo del Prado, Madrid

The classic Torah commentaries offer several interpretations of Jacob's Ladder:

- In Pirkei De-Rabbi Eliezer 35:6-10, the ladder signified the four exiles the Jewish people would suffer before the coming of the messiah. First, the angel representing the Neo-Babylonian Empire climbed "up" 70 rungs and then fell "down": a reference to the 70-year Babylonian exile. Then, the angel representing the exile of the Achaemenid Empire went up several steps and fell, as did the angel representing the exile of Greece (the Hellenistic period, Ptolemaic Kingdom, and the Seleucid Empire). Only the fourth angel, who represented the final exile of the Roman Empire, called "Edom" (whose guardian angel was Esau himself), kept climbing higher and higher into the clouds. Jacob feared that his children would never be free of Esau's domination, but God assured him that at the End of Days, Edom too would fall.
- Another interpretation of the ladder keys into the fact that the angels first "ascended" and then "descended". The Midrash explains that Jacob, as a holy man, was always accompanied by angels. When he reached the border of the land of Canaan (the future Land of Israel), the angels who were assigned to the Holy Land returned to Heaven and the angels assigned to other lands came down to meet Jacob. When Jacob returned to Canaan, he was greeted by the angels who were assigned to the Holy Land.
- Yet another interpretation is that the place at which Jacob stopped for the night was, in reality, Moriah, the future home of the Temple in Jerusalem, which was considered to be the "bridge" between Heaven and Earth. The ladder therefore signifies the "bridge" between Heaven and Earth. Moreover, the ladder alludes to the giving of the Torah as another connection between Heaven and Earth. In this interpretation, it is also significant that the word for ladder (Hebrew: סלם, romanized: sullām) and the name for the mountain on which the Torah was given, Sinai (סיני) have the same Gematria.

The Hellenistic Jewish philosopher Philo, born in Alexandria, (d. c. 50 AD) presents his allegorical interpretation of the ladder in the first book of his De somniis. There, he gives four interpretations, which are not mutually exclusive:

- The angels represent souls descending to and ascending from bodies (some consider this to be Philo's most explicit reference to the doctrine of reincarnation).
- In the second interpretation, the ladder is the human soul, and the angels are God's logoi, pulling the soul up in distress and descending in compassion.
- In the third view, the dream depicts the ups and downs of the life of the "practiser" (of virtue vs. sin).
- Finally, the angels represent the continually changing affairs of humankind.

The narrative of Jacob's Ladder was used, shortly after the destruction of the Second Temple in the Siege of Jerusalem (70 AD), as the basis for the pseudepigraphic Ladder of Jacob. This writing, preserved only in Old Church Slavonic, interprets the experience of Patriarchs in the context of Merkabah mysticism.

A hilltop overlooking the Israeli settlement of Beit El north of Jerusalem, believed by some to be the site of Jacob's dream, is a tourist destination during the holiday of Sukkot.

=== Christianity ===
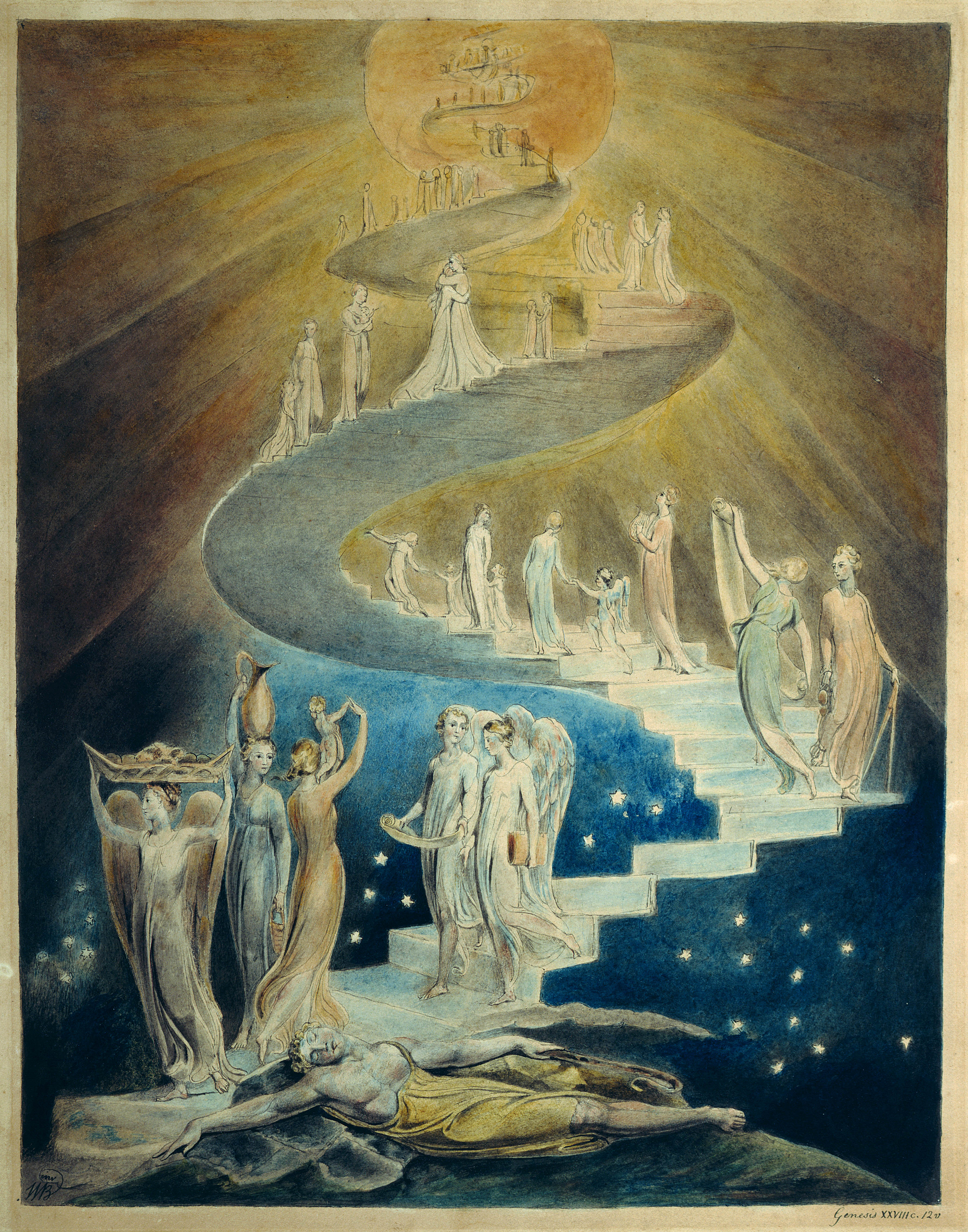
Jacob's Dream by William Blake (c. 1805, British Museum, London)

Jesus said to his disciple Nathanael in John 1:51, "And he saith unto him, 'Verily, verily, I say unto you, Hereafter ye shall see Heaven open, and the angels of God ascending and descending upon the Son of man.'" This statement has been interpreted as associating Jesus with the ladder in that Jesus bridges the gap between Heaven and Earth. Jesus presents himself as the direction to which the ladder points. As Jacob saw the reunion of Heaven and Earth in a dream, Jesus brought this reunion (metaphorically, the ladder) into reality. Adam Clarke, an early 19th-century Methodist theologian and Bible scholar, elaborates:

That by the angels of God ascending and descending, is to be understood, that a perpetual intercourse should now be opened between heaven and earth, through the medium of Christ, who was God manifested in the flesh. Our blessed Lord is represented in his mediatorial capacity as the ambassador of God to men; and the angels ascending and descending upon the Son of Man, is a metaphor taken from the custom of dispatching couriers or messengers from the prince to his ambassador in a foreign court, and from the ambassador back to the prince.

The theme of a ladder to Heaven is often used by the Church Fathers. Irenaeus, in the second century, describes the Christian Church as the "ladder of ascent to God".

In the third century, Origen explains that there are two ladders in the life of a Christian: the ascetic ladder that the soul climbs on Earth, by way of—and resulting in—an increase in virtue, and the soul's travel after death, climbing up the heavens toward the light of God.

In the fourth century, Gregory of Nazianzus wrote of ascending Jacob's ladder by successive steps toward excellence, interpreting the ladder as an ascetic path. At the same time, Gregory of Nyssa narrated that Moses climbed Jacob's ladder to reach the heavens, where he entered a remade tabernacle; thus giving the ladder an apparent mystical meaning. The ascetic interpretation is found also in John Chrysostom, who wrote:

And so mounting as it were by steps, let us get to heaven by a Jacob's ladder. For the ladder seems to me to signify in a riddle by that vision the gradual ascent by means of virtue, by which it is possible for us to ascend from earth to heaven, not using material steps, but improvement and correction of manners.

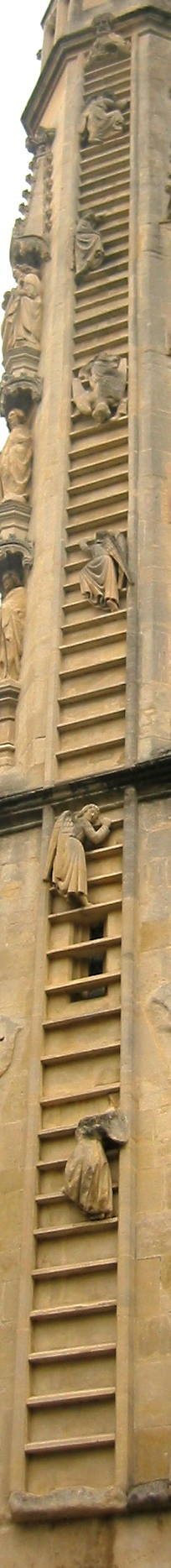
The angels climb Jacob's Ladder on the west front of Bath Abbey.

Jacob's ladder as an analogy for a spiritually ascetic life enjoyed wide influence thanks to the classical work The Ladder of Divine Ascent by John Climacus. As such, the Carthusian monk Guigo II used it as inspiration for his description of the steps of the Lectio Divina, and the contemporary philosopher Peter Kreeft used it in his apologetics.

Jacob's ladder is depicted on the facade of Bath Abbey in England, with angels climbing up and down ladders on either side of the main window on the west front.

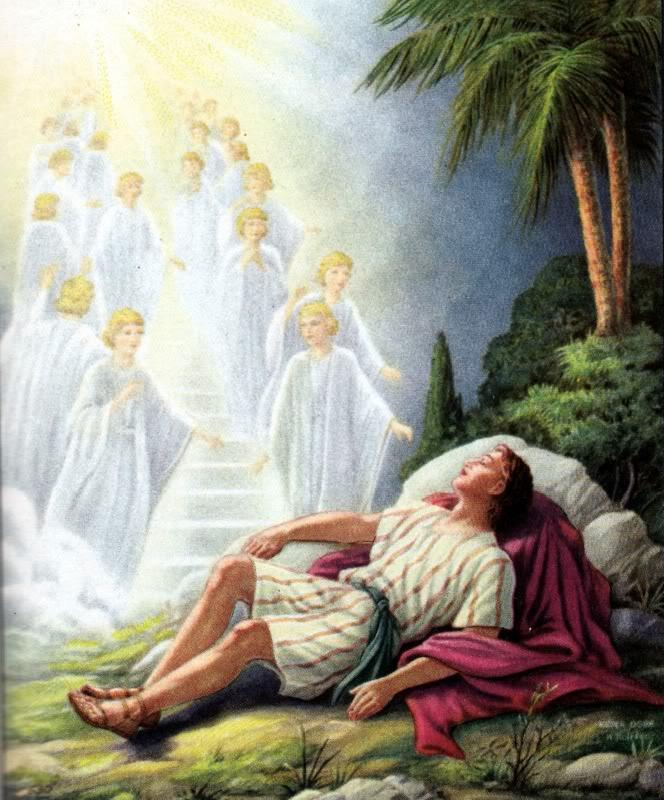
Jacob's Ladder, c. 1925: illustration in an American book of Bible stories for children

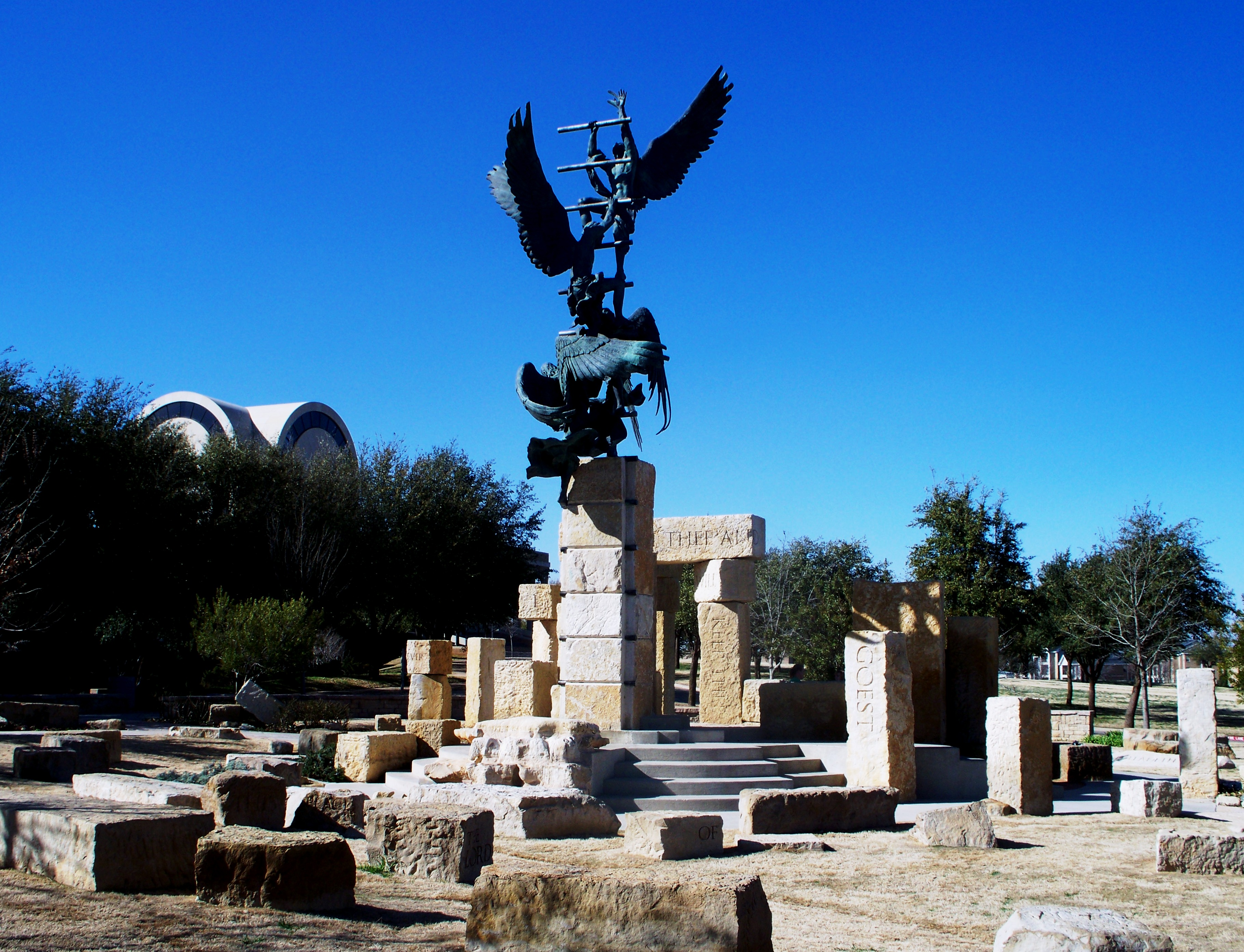
Jacob's Dream: artwork on the campus of Abilene Christian University

=== Islam ===
In Islam, Jacob (Arabic: يَعْقُوب, romanized: Yaʿqūb) is revered as a prophet and patriarch. Muslim scholars drew a parallel between Jacob's vision of the ladder and Muhammad's event of the Miʿrāj. The ladder of Jacob was interpreted to be one of the many symbols of God, and many see Jacob's Ladder as representing in its form the essence of Islam, which emphasizes following the "straight path". The twentieth-century Muslim scholar Martin Lings described the significance of the ladder in the Islamic mystic perspective:

The ladder of the created Universe is the ladder which appeared in a dream to Jacob, who saw it stretching from Heaven to earth, with Angels going up and down upon it; and it is also the "straight path", for indeed the way of religion is none other than the way of creation itself retraced from its end back to its Beginning.

— Lings, Martin. The Book of Certainty. p. 51.

== See also ==
- As-Sirāt
- Crepuscular rays
- "Jack and the Beanstalk"
- Die Jakobsleiter, unfinished oratorio by Arnold Schoenberg
- Locus iste, motet by Anton Bruckner
- "Nearer, My God, to Thee", hymn lyrics (written 1841) by Sarah Fuller Flower Adams
- The Dream of Jacob, orchestral piece by Krzysztof Penderecki
- Space elevator
- Stairway to Heaven (disambiguation)
- The Ladder of Divine Ascent
- Trāyastriṃśa
- Bifröst, another example of connection with realm of gods in mythology
- Dante's Equation
- Jacob's ladder (nautical)
- Jacob's Ladder is a 1990 psychological horror film, directed by Adrian Lyne.
