= Hama (company) =

German consumer electronics company

Hama GmbH & Co KG
- Type: Private
- Genre: photo and electronics technology
- Founded: Dresden, Saxony, Germany, 1923; 103 years ago
- Founder: Martin Hanke
- Headquarters: Monheim, Bavaria, Germany
- Number of locations: 12 Subsidiaries (2011)
- Area served: Worldwide
- Key people: Christoph Thomas, Rudolph Hanke; CEO
- Revenue: €532.2 million (2009)
- Number of employees: 2500 (2011)
- Subsidiaries: Hama Technics Handels GmbH (Austria); Agami NV (Belgium; Hama spol. s.r.o. (Czech Republic); HAMA EURL. France; Hama (UK) Ltd. (Great Britain); HAMA Kereskedelmi-Kft. (Hungary); Hama Group Holst BV (Netherlands); Hama Polska Sp. z o.o. (Poland); Companhia Hama Portugal LDA (Portugal); Hama Slovakia spol. s.r.o. (Slovakia); Hama Technics, S.L. (Spain); Hama Technics AG (Switzerland)
- Website: hama.com

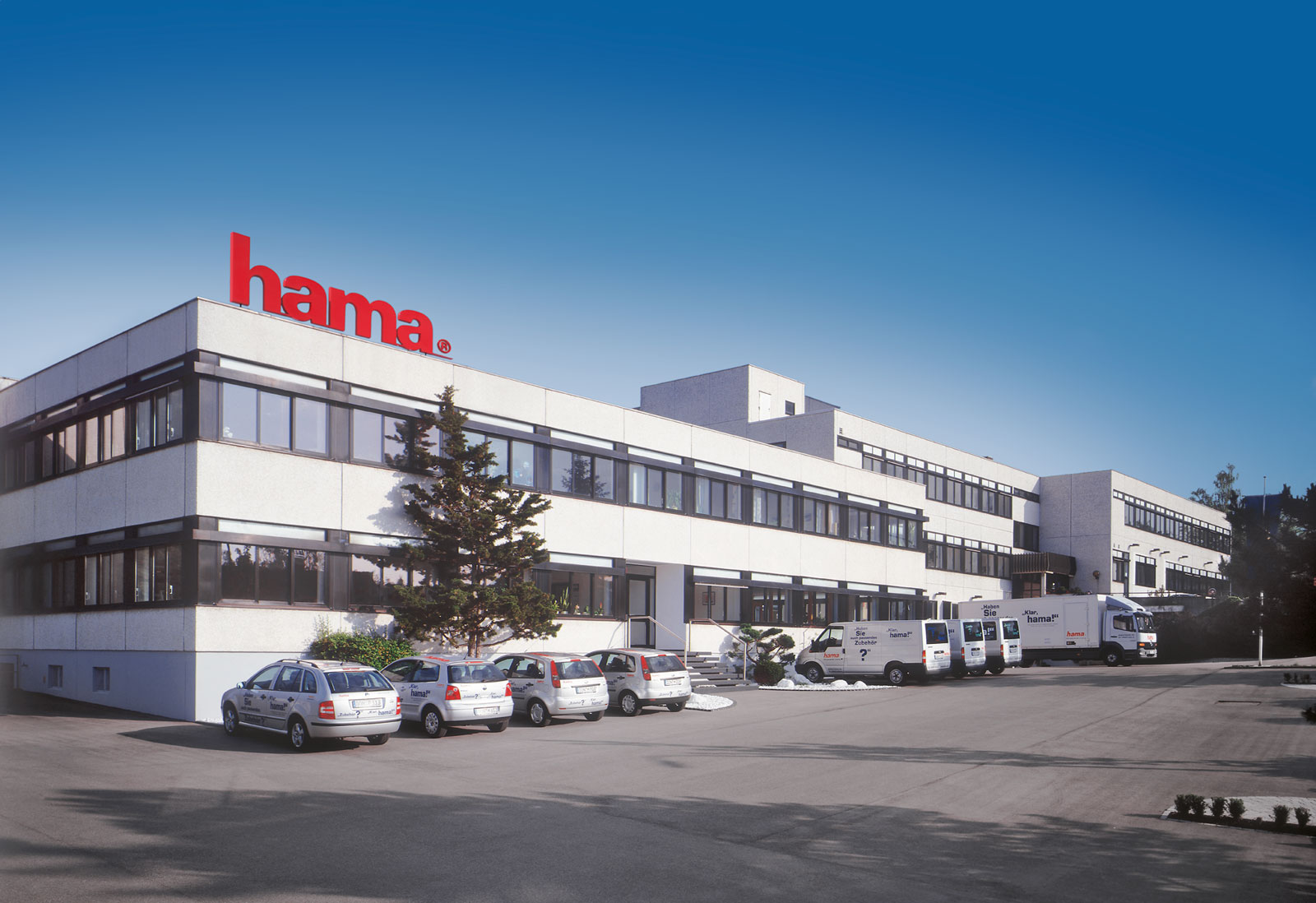
Hama GmbH & Co KG headquarters in Monheim

Hama GmbH & Co KG is a German distributor of consumer electronics specialising in accessories. The company acts as a distributor of various product ranges in photo, video, audio, multimedia, computer and telecommunications. Hama employs around 2,500 people worldwide, 1,500 employees work at the headquarters in Monheim, Bavaria, Germany. Hama is represented by 17 subsidiaries and numerous commercial agencies in Europe and beyond.

Among the products Hama manufacture are:

- Filters
- Tripods
- Memory cards
- Camera bags
- Headphones
- Flash and studio accessories
- AV cables (coaxial and SCART)

along with various computer accessories including peripherals and USB, FireWire, and Ethernet cables and other miscellaneous items.

== History ==
=== Formation ===
In 1923, the 18-year-old photographer Martin Hanke founded the Hamaphot KG (limited partnership) in Dresden, which specialized in photo accessories. When Dresden was bombarded in the Second World War, the company was destroyed. It was rebuilt in Monheim in 1945. In 1958, the first synchronized flash powder device was presented, in 1972 the world's first automatic film splicer. Three years later, the "Hamafix" slide mounting system came onto the market. In 1990, Hama established their UK branch Hama PVAC Ltd. (Hama Photo, Video, Audio, Communications) and are UK distributor for Celestron, Tasco, Sandisk, Vivitar and Koss products. In 1991, Hama launched the "Videocut 200" which - according to company representatives – was the most frequently sold video editing device in Europe at that time. In 1993, the company name changed from Hamaphot to Hama. Two years later, the "MobileSafe" mobile phone holder was put on the market. In 1998, the company celebrated its seventy-fifth anniversary.

Today, the product range does not only comprise articles for photo and video applications, but also accessories from the areas of audiovisual, multimedia, game console, telecommunications and from a number of more areas.

=== Scandals ===
In early 2008, over 30,000 flash drives built by a fraudulent Chinese supplier were distributed by Hama. The flash drives were manipulated to overreport their capacity to the computer, possibly leading to data loss upon attempted writing to physically nonexistent sectors, which usually initially is unnoticed by users. Upon discovery, a product recall was launched.

== Well-known Hama products ==
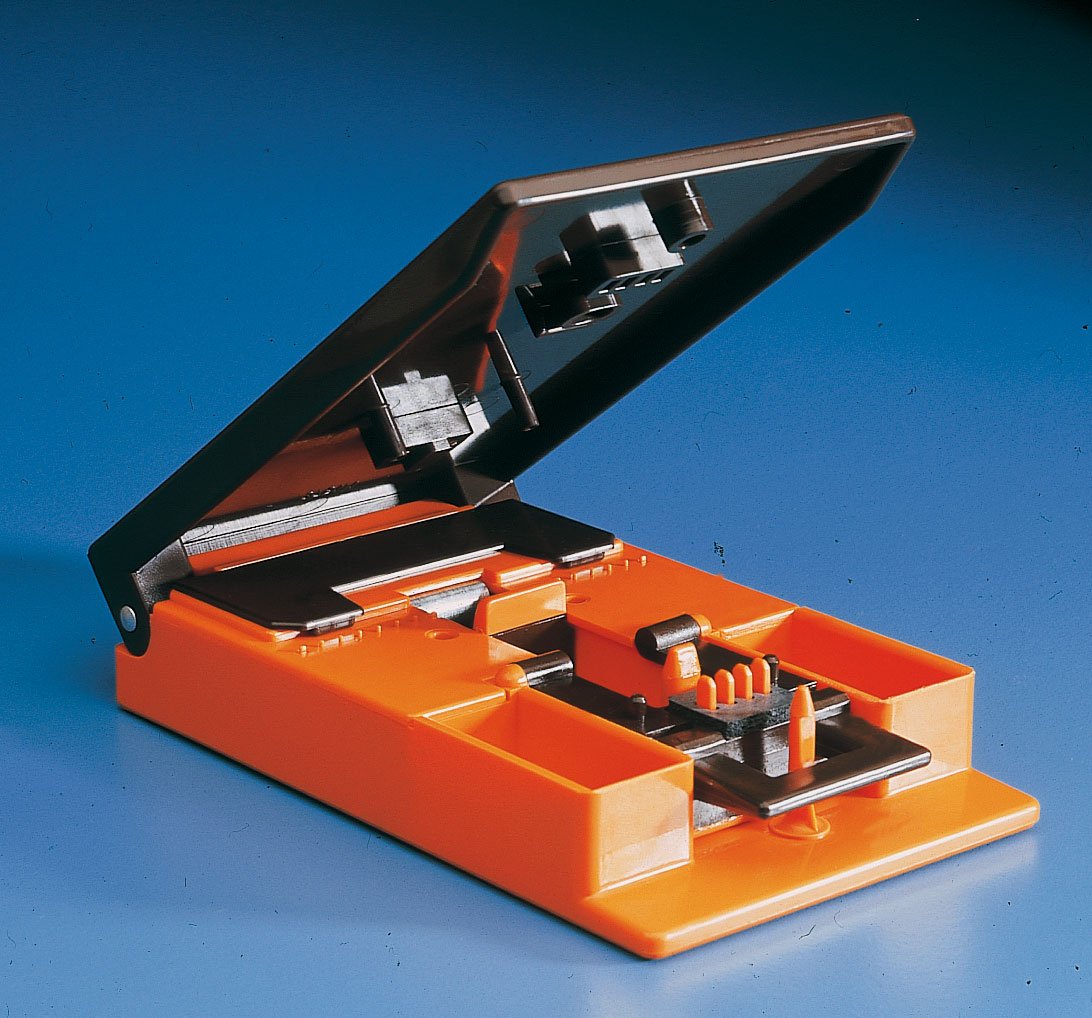
Automated Film Splicer Cinepress (1972)

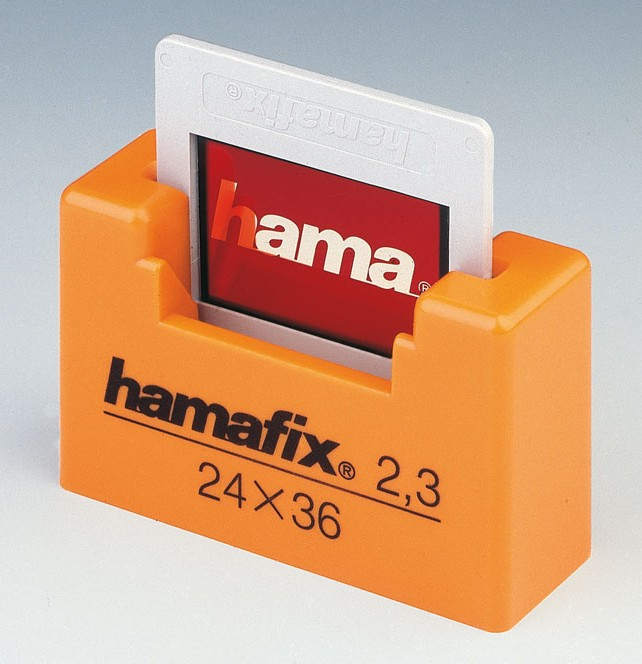
Slide Mounting Device "HamaFix" (1975)

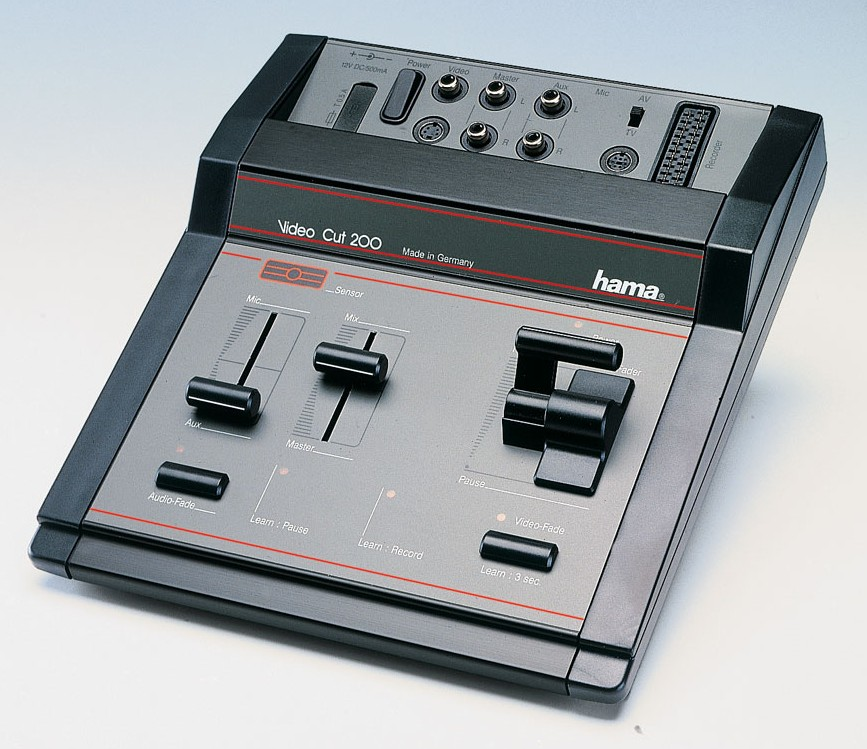
Video Cutting Device "Videocut 200" (1991)

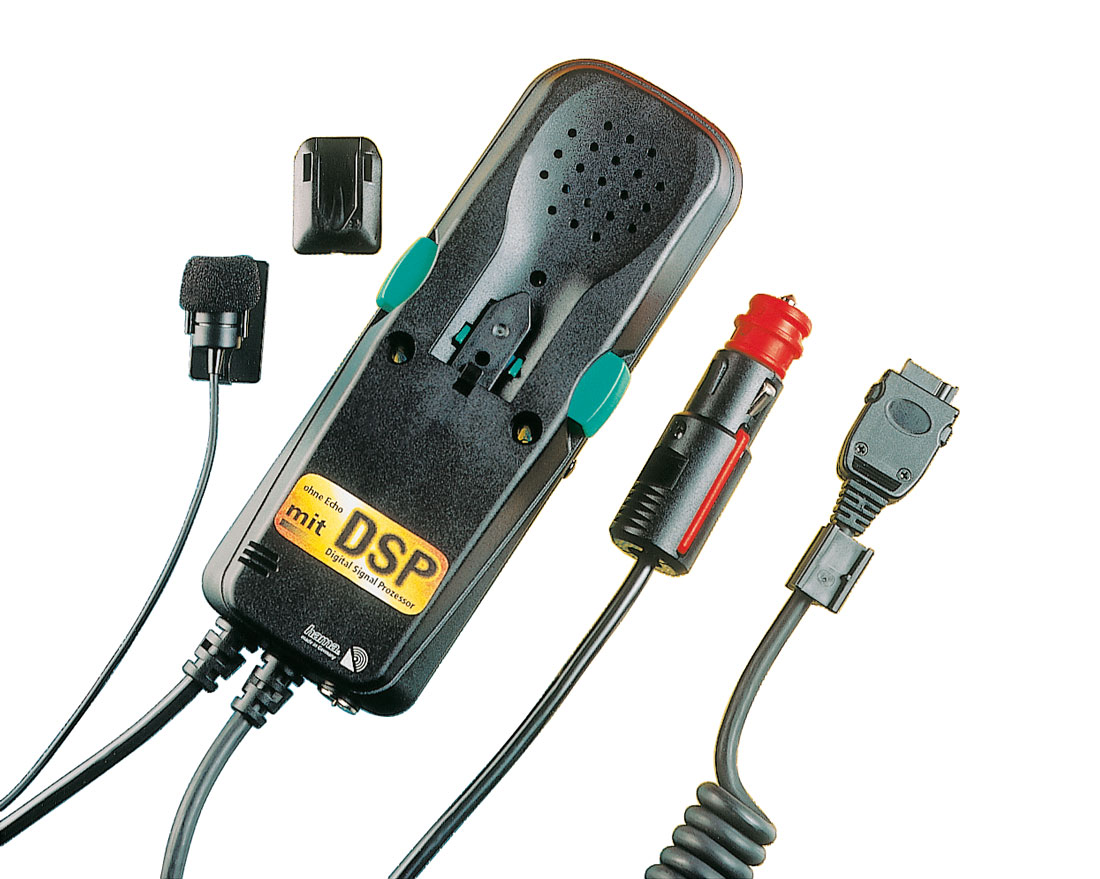
Mobile Phone Holder/Fixing System "MobilSafe" (1995)
