= Mörnsheim =

- Municipality
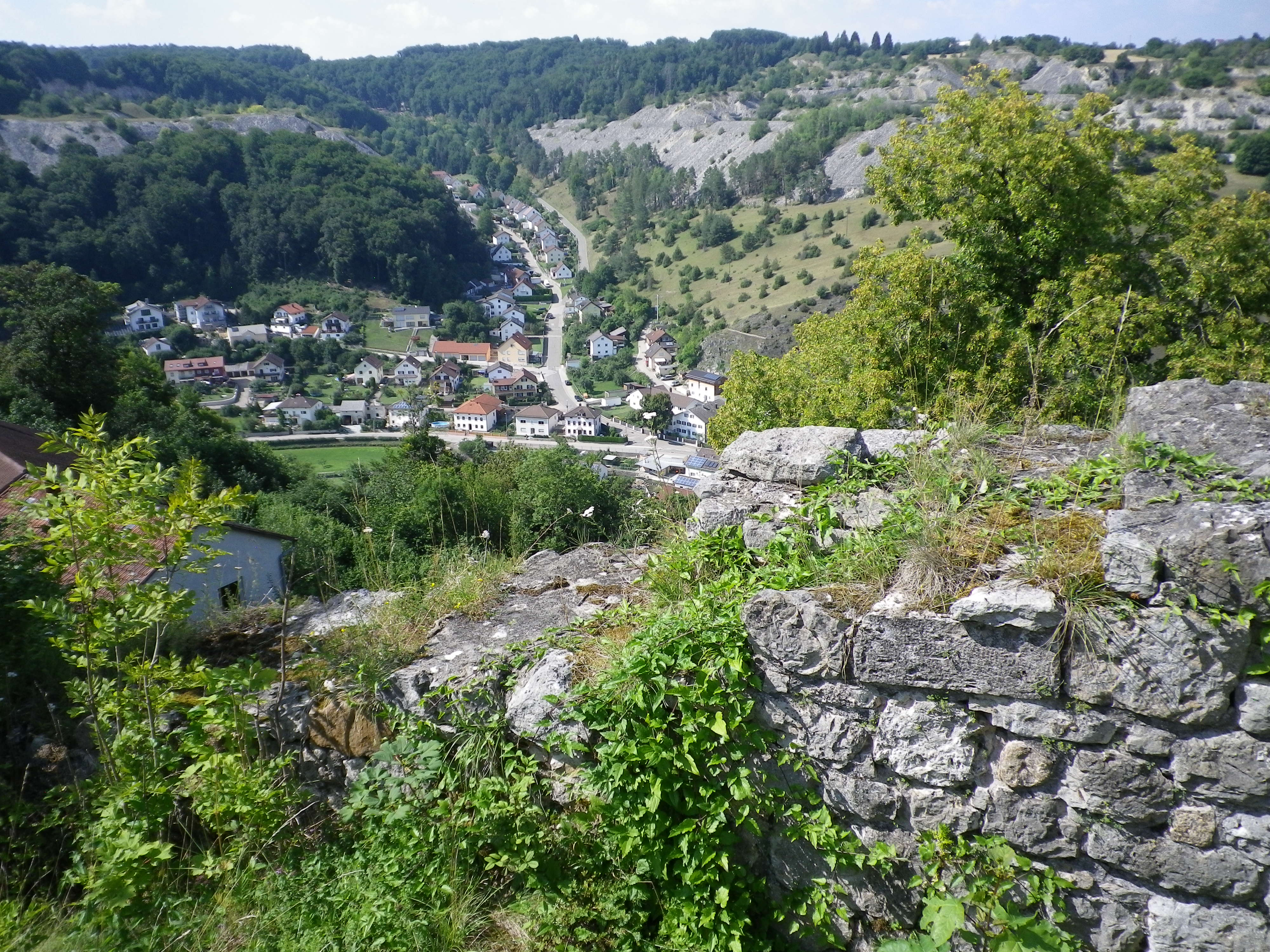
- Mörnsheim seen from the nearby hills

- Coat of arms

- Location of Mörnsheim within Eichstätt district
- Interactive map of Mörnsheim
- Location within Germany Location within Bavaria
- Coordinates: 48°53′N 11°00′E
- Country: Germany
- State: Bavaria
- Admin. region: Oberbayern
- District: Eichstätt
- Subdivisions: 5 Ortsteile

Government
  - Mayor (2020–26): Richard Mittl

Area
  - Total: 33.45 km^{2} (12.92 sq mi)
- Elevation: 408 m (1,339 ft)

Population (2025-12-31)
  - Total: 1,523
  - Density: 45.53/km^{2} (117.9/sq mi)
- Time zone: UTC+01:00 (CET)
  - Summer (DST): UTC+02:00 (CEST)
- Postal codes: 91804
- Dialling codes: 09145
- Vehicle registration: EI
- Website: www.moernsheim.de

Mörnsheim (German pronunciation: [ˈmœʁnshaɪm]), or Moernsheim, is a municipality in the district of Eichstätt in Bavaria in Germany. It lies on the river Gailach and the surrounding rocks date back to the Late Jurassic (Tithonian).
