= Huisheim =

- Municipality
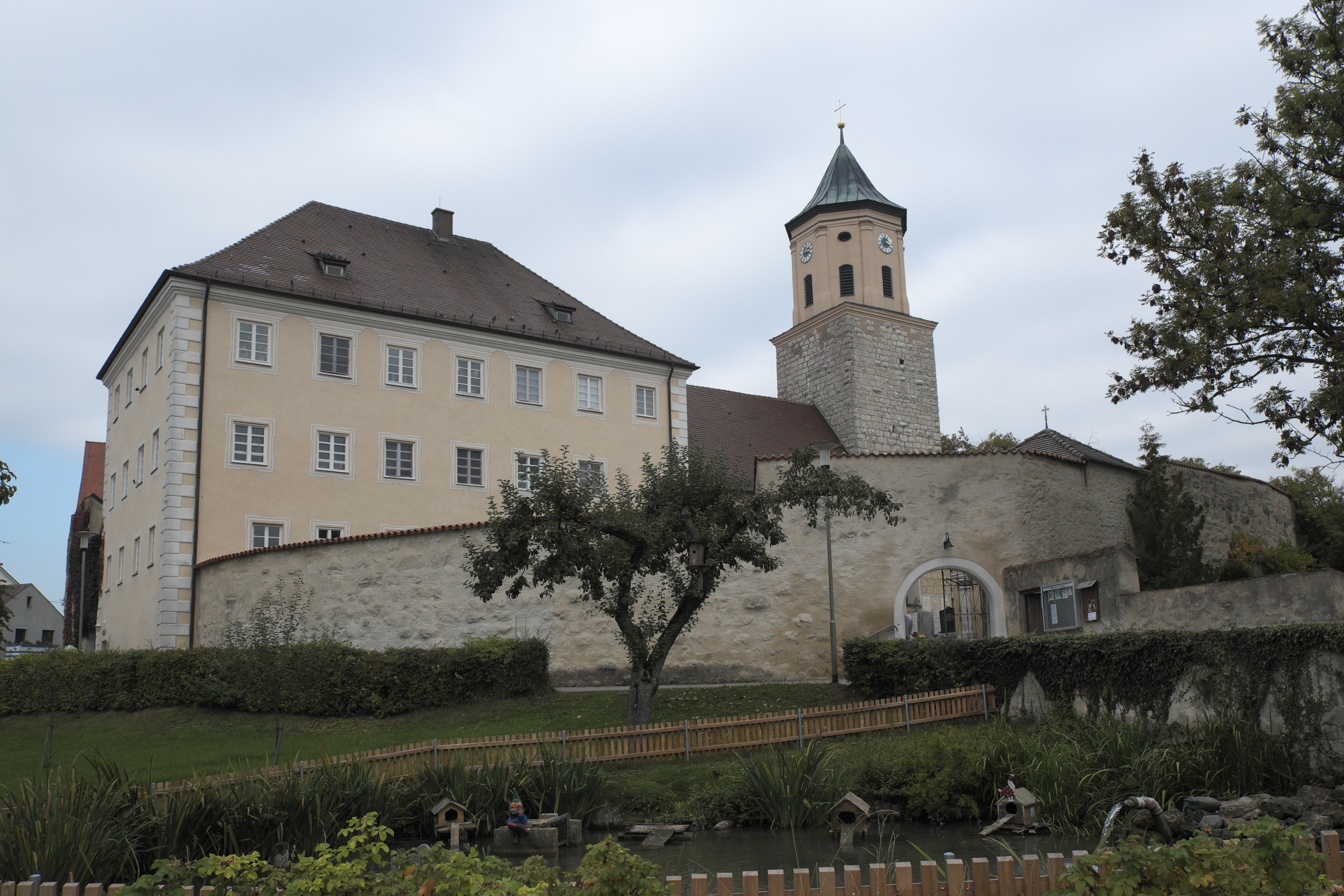
- Gosheim Castle

- Coat of arms

- Location of Huisheim within Donau-Ries district
- Interactive map of Huisheim
- Location within Germany Location within Bavaria
- Coordinates: 48°49′N 10°42′E
- Country: Germany
- State: Bavaria
- Admin. region: Schwaben
- District: Donau-Ries
- Municipal assoc.: Wemding

Government
  - Mayor (2020–26): Harald Müller (SPD)

Area
  - Total: 22.79 km^{2} (8.80 sq mi)
- Elevation: 455 m (1,493 ft)

Population (2025-12-31)
  - Total: 1,636
  - Density: 71.79/km^{2} (185.9/sq mi)
- Time zone: UTC+01:00 (CET)
  - Summer (DST): UTC+02:00 (CEST)
- Postal codes: 86685
- Dialling codes: 09080
- Vehicle registration: DON
- Website: www.huisheim.de

Huisheim is a municipality in the district of Donau-Ries in Bavaria in Germany.
