= Wemding (Verwaltungsgemeinschaft) =

- Verwaltungsgemeinschaft
- Location of Wemding within Donau-Ries district
- Interactive map of Wemding
- Location within Germany Location within Bavaria
- Coordinates: 48°52′N 10°43′E
- Country: Germany
- State: Bavaria
- Admin. region: Swabia
- District: Donau-Ries
- Seat: Wemding
- Subdivisions: 5 municipalities

Area
  - Total: 125.14 km^{2} (48.32 sq mi)

Population (2025-12-31)
  - Total: 10,641
  - Density: 85.033/km^{2} (220.23/sq mi)
- Time zone: UTC+01:00 (CET)
  - Summer (DST): UTC+02:00 (CEST)
- Website: www.vg-wemding.de

Wemding is a Verwaltungsgemeinschaft (municipal association) in the district Donau-Ries in Bavaria, Germany. Its seat is in Wemding.

It consists of the following municipalities:

1. Fünfstetten
2. Huisheim
3. Otting
4. Wemding
5. Wolferstadt
