= Jacob's Dream =

1639 painting by José de Ribera

Jacob’s Dream
- El sueño de Jacob (Spanish)
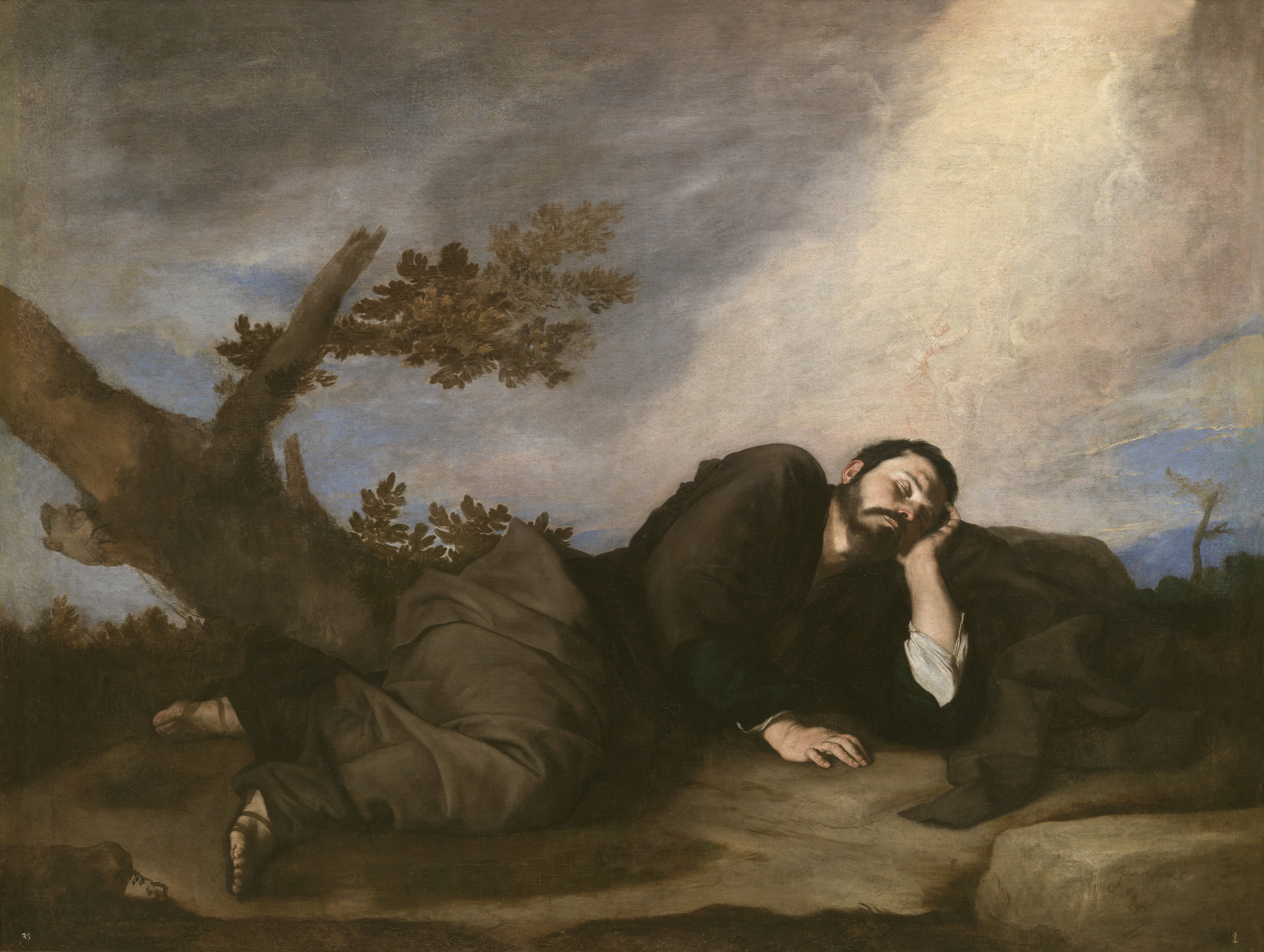
- Artist: Lo Spagnoletto
- Year: 1639
- Medium: Oil on canvas
- Dimensions: 179 cm × 233 cm (70 in × 92 in)
- Location: Museo del Prado, Madrid

Jacob's Dream (Spanish: El sueño de Jacob) is a 1639 oil-on-canvas painting by the Spanish Tenebrist painter José de Ribera (Lo Spagnoletto).

== Description ==
It measures 179 by 233 centimetres (70 in × 92 in) and is in the Museo del Prado in Madrid.

== Analysis ==
Jacob appears as a shepherd sleeping, resting on his left shoulder with a tree behind him. In the background on the other side is the ladder that he sees in his dream. It is not a wooden ladder but a ladder of light, "pointing heavenwards, with angels like little birds climbing up it".

== Influences ==
The American 20th-century abstract painter Helen Frankenthaler cited Ribera's Jacob's Dream as an inspiration for her 1957 painting titled Jacob's Ladder, currently in the collection of The Museum of Modern Art in New York.
