= Gailach =

River in Germany

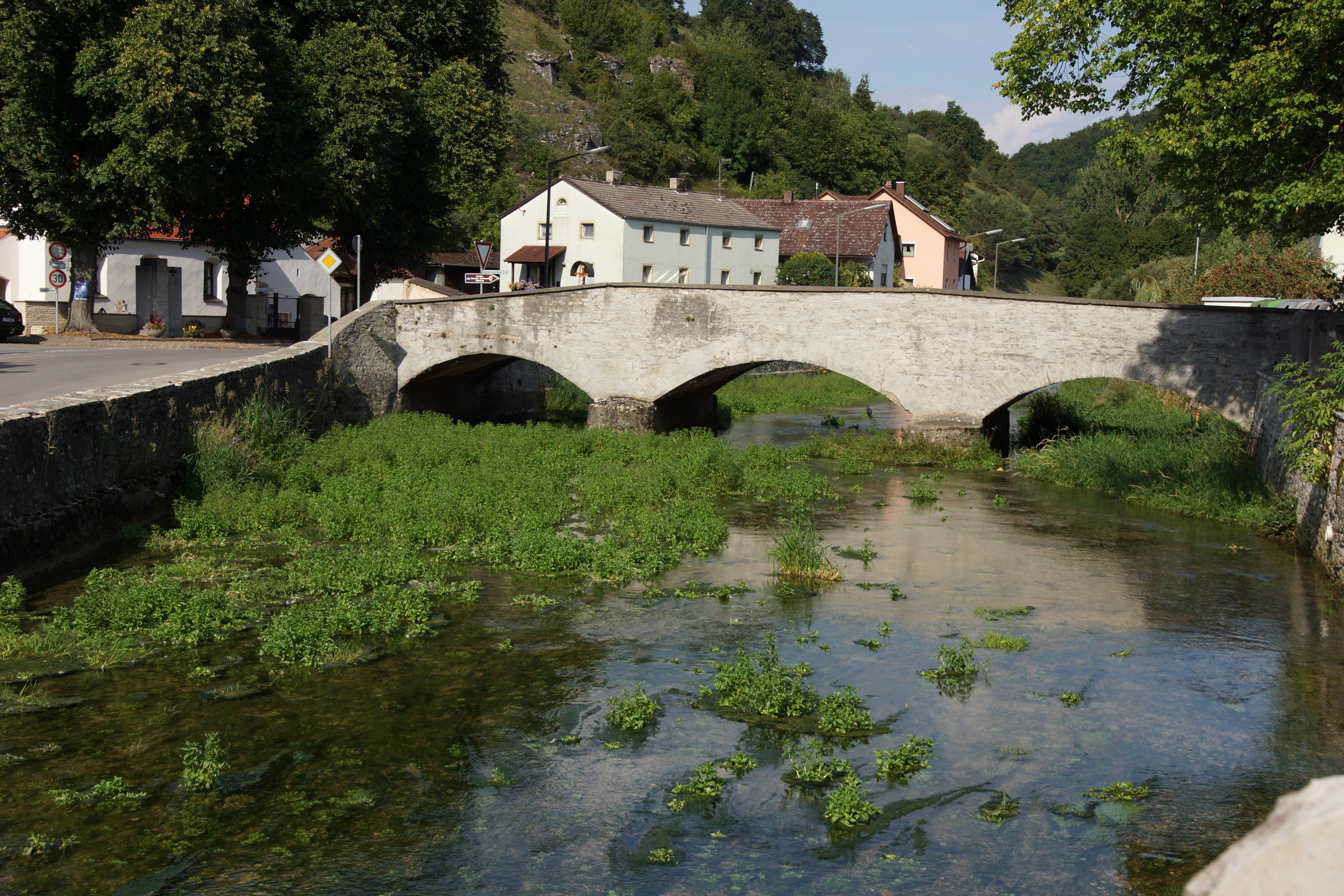
- Bridge over the river Gailach at Mühlheim (part of Mörnsheim)

Location
- Country: Germany
- State: Bavaria

Physical characteristics
- Source
  - location: Kreut
- Mouth
  - location: Altmühl
  - coordinates: 48.8734°N 11.0233°E
- Length: 21.7 km (13.5 mi)

Basin features
- Progression: Altmühl→ Danube→ Black Sea

The Gailach (German pronunciation: [ˈɡaɪlax]) is a river of Bavaria, Germany. It flows into the Altmühl near Mörnsheim.

== See also ==
- List of rivers of Bavaria
