= John 1:51 =

- ← 1:50 2:1 →
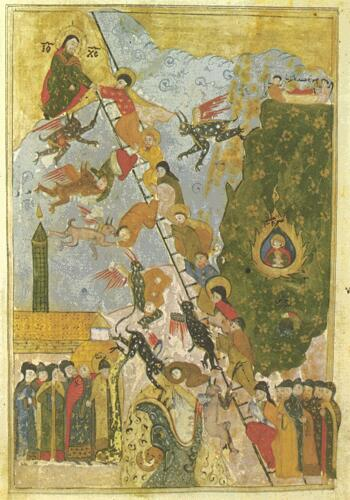
- "The Ladder of Divine Ascent", Sinai Festal Icon. (1612).
- Book: Gospel of John
- Christian Bible part: New Testament

John 1:51 is the 51st (and the last) verse in the first chapter of the Gospel of John in the New Testament.

== Content ==
In the original Greek according to Westcott-Hort this verse is:

Καὶ λέγει αὐτῷ, Ἀμὴν ἀμὴν λέγω ὑμῖν, ἀπ᾿ ἄρτι ὄψεσθε τὸν οὐρανὸν ἀνεῳγότα, καὶ τοὺς ἀγγέλους τοῦ Θεοῦ ἀναβαίνοντας καὶ καταβαίνοντας ἐπὶ τὸν υἱὸν τοῦ ἀνθρώπου.

In the King James Version of the Bible the text reads:

And he saith unto him, Verily, verily, I say unto you, Hereafter ye shall see heaven open, and the angels of God ascending and descending upon the Son of man.

The New International Version translates the passage as:

He then added, "I tell you the truth, you shall see heaven open, and the angels of God ascending and descending on the Son of Man."

== Analysis ==
Irish Archbishop John McEvilly believes that the "Amen, Amen" used in this verse points to the importance of what is about to follow. He also believes that Jesus uses the title of "Son of man" rather than "Son of God" out of humility. However the larger question is when does this opening of the heavens occur? And what of the angels ascending and descending, which occurred formerly with Jacob's ladder in his dream (Gen 28:12)? Lapide enumerates the many possibilities: 1) when Christ suffered His agony in the garden of Gethsemane, and an angel appeared, strengthening Him (Luke, 22:44). 2) At His baptism; because then by the ministry of angels a dove was formed, and flew down upon Christ. 3) Euthymius the Great believes it took place at his ascension, "for then all the angels accompanied Him as He went up." 4) Juan Maldonado believes it has yet to happen and will take place on the Day of Judgment, "for then all the angels, both good and bad, will stand in His presence."

== Commentary from the Church Fathers ==
Augustine: "Let us recollect the Old Testament account. Jacob saw in a dream a ladder reaching from earth to heaven; the Lord resting upon it, and the angels ascending and descending upon it. Lastly, Jacob himself understanding what the vision meant, set up a stone, and poured oil upon it. (Gen. 28:12.) When he anointed the stone, did he make an idol? No: he only set up a symbol, not an object of worship. Thou seest here the anointing; see the Anointed also. He is the stone which the builders refused. If Jacob, who was named Israel, saw the ladder, and Nathanael was an Israelite indeed, there was a fitness in our Lord telling him Jacob’s dream; as if he said, Whose name thou art called by, his dream hath appeared unto thee: for thou shalt see the heaven open, and the angels of God ascending and descending upon the Son of man. If they descend upon Him, and ascend to Him, then He is both up above and here below at the same time; above in Himself, below in His members."

Augustine: "Good preachers, however, who preach Christ, are as angels of God; i. e. they ascend and descend upon the Son of man; as Paul, who ascended to the third heaven, and descended so far even as to give milk to babes. He saith, We shall see greater things than these: (2 Cor. 12:2. 1 Cor. 3:2) because it is a greater thing that our Lord has justified us, whom He hath called, than that He saw us lying under the shadow of death. For had we remained where He saw us, what profit would it have been? . It is asked why Nathanael, to whom our Lord bears such testimony, is not found among the twelve Apostles. We may believe, however, that it was because he was so learned, and versed in the law, that our Lord had not put him among the disciples. He chose the foolish, to confound the world. Intending to break the neck of the proud, He sought not to gain the fisherman through the orator, but by the fisherman the emperor. The great Cyprian was an orator; but Peter was a fisherman before him; and through him not only the orator, but the emperor, believed."

Preceded by John 1:50	Gospel of John; Chapter 1	Succeeded by John 2:1
