= Fünfstetten =

- Municipality
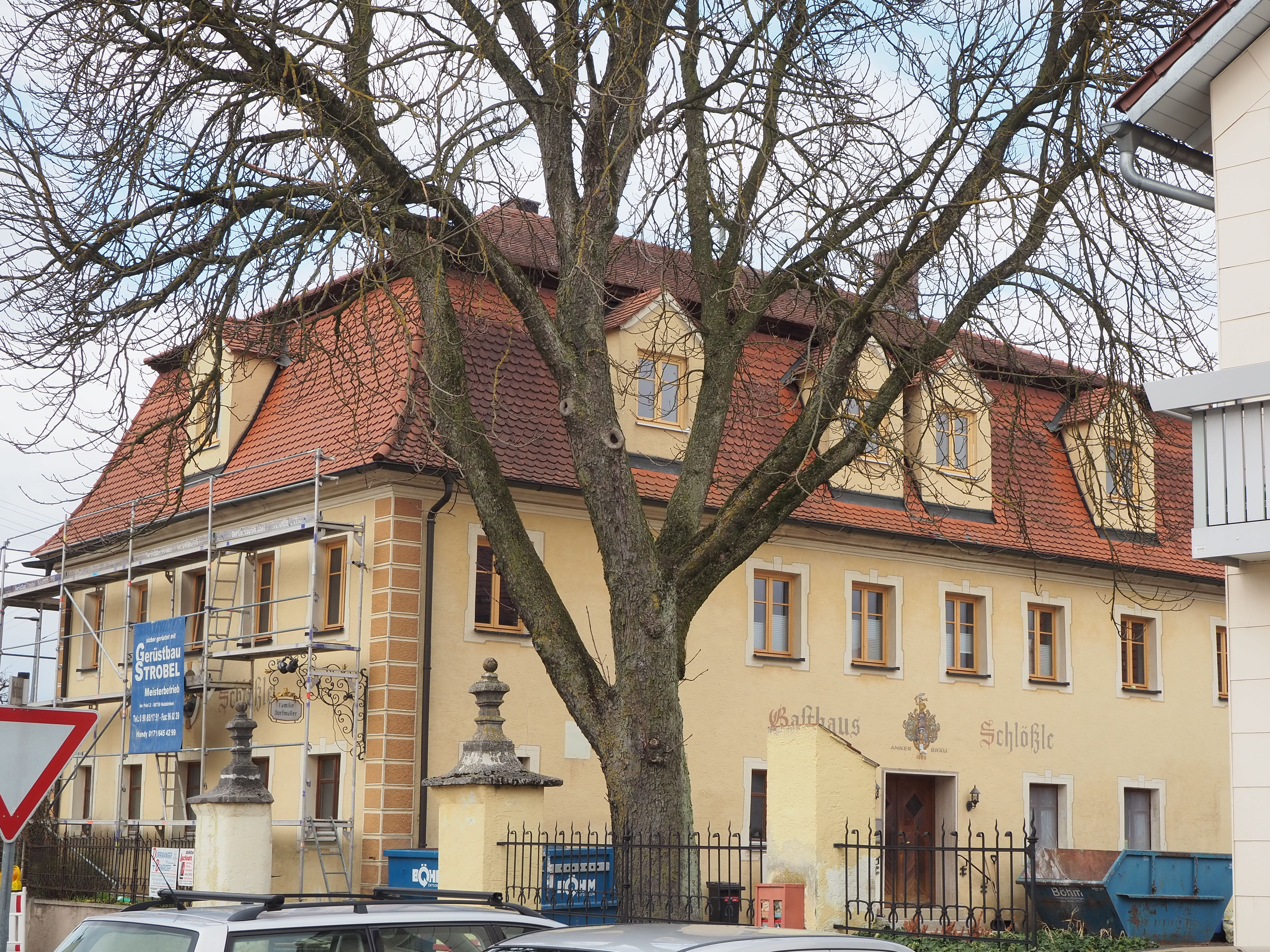
- "Schlößle" Inn in Fünfstetten

- Coat of arms

- Location of Fünfstetten within Donau-Ries district
- Interactive map of Fünfstetten
- Location within Germany Location within Bavaria
- Coordinates: 48°49′N 10°46′E
- Country: Germany
- State: Bavaria
- Admin. region: Schwaben
- District: Donau-Ries
- Municipal assoc.: Wemding

Government
  - Mayor (2020–26): Josef Bickelbacher

Area
  - Total: 26.72 km^{2} (10.32 sq mi)
- Elevation: 480 m (1,570 ft)

Population (2025-12-31)
  - Total: 1,339
  - Density: 50.11/km^{2} (129.8/sq mi)
- Time zone: UTC+01:00 (CET)
  - Summer (DST): UTC+02:00 (CEST)
- Postal codes: 86681
- Dialling codes: 09091
- Vehicle registration: DON
- Website: www.fuenfstetten.de

Fünfstetten is a municipality in the district of Donau-Ries in Bavaria in Germany.
