= Stairway to Hell (disambiguation) =

Stairway to Hell is a 2012 EP by Ugly Kid Joe

== Books ==
- Stairway to Hell, novel by Charlie Williams 2009
- Stairway to Hell: The 500 Best Heavy Metal Albums in the Universe, by Chuck Eddy 1998

== Film and TV ==
- "Stairway to Hell", 2004 episode of Neighbours
- "Stairway to Hell", 2011 episode of The Devil You Know (TV program)
- "Stairway to Hell (Disenchantment)", 2019 episode of Disenchantment

== Music ==
- "Stairway To Hell/Sex Is No Emergency", single by Monte Cazazza 1982
- "Stairway To Hell", song by The Amity Affliction from Severed Ties
  - Stairway to Hell Tour 2009, The Amity Affliction
- "Stairway to Hell", single by Alan Mair 2015
- "Stairway to Hell" (地獄への階段, Jigoku he no Kaidan?) 1987 from Seikima-II discography

== Other ==
- Stairway to Hell Match, type of wrestling match
