= Monheim, Bavaria =

Monheim
- Municipality
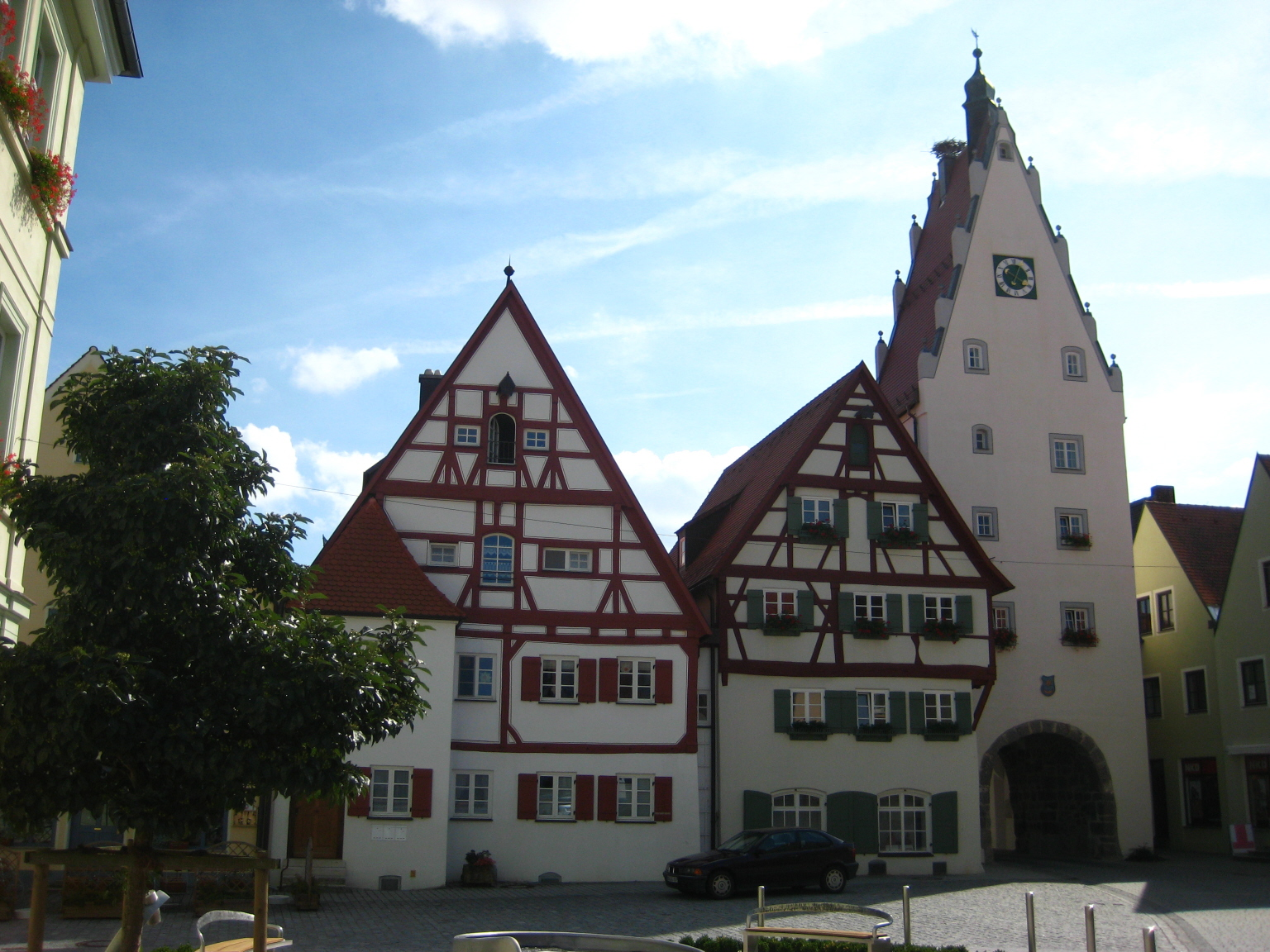
- The southern gate of Monheim

- Coat of arms

- Location of Monheim within Donau-Ries district
- Interactive map of Monheim
- Location within Germany Location within Bavaria
- Coordinates: 48°50′N 10°50′E
- Country: Germany
- State: Bavaria
- Admin. region: Schwaben
- District: Donau-Ries
- Municipal assoc.: Monheim

Government
  - Mayor (2020–26): Günther Pfefferer (CSU)

Area
  - Total: 69.33 km^{2} (26.77 sq mi)
- Elevation: 495 m (1,624 ft)

Population (2025-12-31)
  - Total: 5,416
  - Density: 78.12/km^{2} (202.3/sq mi)
- Time zone: UTC+01:00 (CET)
  - Summer (DST): UTC+02:00 (CEST)
- Postal codes: 86653
- Dialling codes: 09091
- Vehicle registration: DON
- Website: www.monheim-bayern.de

Monheim (German pronunciation: [ˈmoːnˌhaɪm]) is a town in the Donau-Ries district, in Bavaria, Germany. It is situated 15 km northeast of Donauwörth, and 27 km east of Nördlingen. It lies in the Regierungsbezirk Schwaben.

== History ==
The origins of Monheim date back into the 7th century, when a village was formed at the crossing of the Gailach, a small river running into the Altmühl. From 870, a Benedictian convent existed within the small town. In 893, the abbess of the convent, Mother Liubila, transferred it to the Bishop of Eichstätt, Erchanbald, and it was then that Monheim was first mentioned in an official document. It became an important place of pilgrimage due to the relics of Saint Walpurga, a former abbess of the convent in Eichstätt. Unlike virtually all of Schwaben, which belongs to the Diocese of Augsburg, Monheim is still part of the Diocese of Eichstätt today.

The village of Monheim came into possession of the Graf von Oettingen, now the House of Oettingen-Wallerstein, around the year 1325. Monheim was awarded its town rights shortly after and the oldest seal of the town dates from 1340. The seal from 1340 already shows the moon, which is still part of the towns crest today. The name Monheim however does not derive from moon. Until 1821, the crest's colors were red and silver, the colors of the House of Oettingen. Only after 1821 were the current blue and gold adopted.

The town was fortified, lying at the intersection of the important trade route from Augsburg to Nürnberg, which is nowadays the Bundesstraße 2, and the road from Nördlingen to Neuburg an der Donau. Some of this wall still remains today, including both gates.

The town remained a possession of Oettingen until the end of the Landshut war of succession in 1505. Monheim was then handed to the duchy Palatinate-Neuburg (German: Pfalz-Neuburg), whom it remained with until 1808. The duke Heinrich introduced the Reformation to his lands and Monheim in 1530 and the convent in town was dissolved. Monheim lost its relics and with it much of its religious importance for the region. The convent building was taken down in 1574 but the large Saint Walpurga church, the current building dating from 1509, and some of the convents Romanesque courtyard, dating from the 12th century, remained. The courtyard was fully restored in 1977.

Martin Luther spent a night in Monheim, traveling back from an interrogation in 1518. A large plaque of this notable event remains at the location he stayed.

In 1614, the Elector Wilhelm reintroduced Catholicism in Palatinate-Neuburg, including Monheim, but the convent was not restored. The Swedish army under the King of Sweden, Gustav Adolf, ransacked Monheim in 1632 during the Thirty Years' War, an event the town took long to recover from.

From 1523 onwards, Monheim also became the seat of the county court (German:Landgerichtssitz) for the surrounding region and in 1650 a small palace (German:Schloß) was built for the duke's administrator.

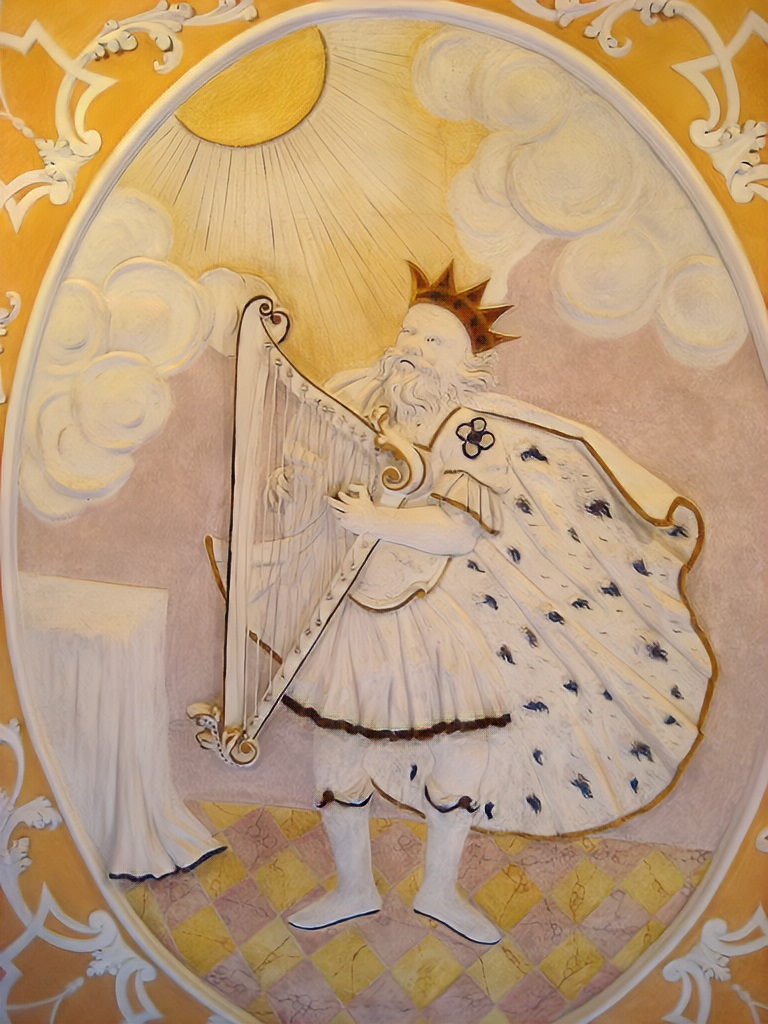
King David on the ceiling of Monheim town hall

The year 1697 saw the first arrival of Jews in Monheim. In 1741, they had to leave the town again, under pressure from the authorities. The current town hall was built by a rich Jewish merchant, the Court Jew Abraham Elias Model, between 1714 and 1720. Model was the chief creditor for the Graf von Wallerstein at that time. The upper floor of his house originally was thought to have served as the synagogue for the small Jewish community, a fact since disproved, and in 1978 and 1994 the original ceilings, displaying motives from the Old Testament, or Tanakh, were fully restored. The fact that they were covered by a layer of gypsum, which had to be removed, saved them from almost certain destruction by the Nazis. The rooms now serve as the meeting hall for the town council.

The end of the War of Bavarian Succession in 1779 saw the reunification of Bavaria with Palatinate-Neuburg and Neuburg lost its status as a capital. Monheim was now Bavarian again.

Like most of Bavaria, the age of industrialisation bypassed Monheim and it remained predominantly agricultural. The two world wars saw great personal losses but no real destruction for the town.

During the Nazi era, Monheim saw its mayor, Josef Hofmann, replaced with local party leader Albert Königsdorfer. Some of the members of the local council were temporarily taken in "protective custody". Resistance to the Nazis was passive, at best. When the figurine of Saint Walpurga on the fountain of the market square was replaced by a more war-like motif in October 1937, the Catholic parish priest, Anton Geitner, an anti-Nazi, refused the Nazi salute and found himself heavily criticised.

Liberation came to Monheim on 24 April 1945, with only limited amounts of fighting taking place. A number of houses in town were shelled and the white flag was raised in town by Matthias Schmied, mayor of Monheim from 1945 to 1947, who was quickly followed in his example by other citizens. In appreciation of the fact that the town survived the war with such little damage, the local town council decreed that a church service was to be held annually on the 24 April. Monheim experienced a short occupation of four days before the US soldiers left the town again.

The post-World War II years saw a growth in small industries in town. The county court was relocated from Monheim in 1957. The reorganisation of communities in Bavaria and Germany between 1972 and 1978 meant that Monheim came in charge of the previously independent surrounding villages, enlarging the town in size and population.

== Main sights ==
- The Stadtpfarrkirche, the catholic parish and convent church, dating from 1500
- The Kreuzgang, the former convent courtyard, adjacent to the church, dating from the 12th century
- The Rathaus, the town hall, former Jewish residence, dating from 1714, open to the public
- The two Stadttore, the southern and northern gates of the town, dating from the 14th century

== Incorporated villages ==
- Rehau
- Flotzheim
- Weilheim
- Wittesheim
- Warching
- Kölburg
- Itzing
- Ried

== Town council ==
The town mayor is Günther Pfefferer, of the CSU, in office since 2012.

As of 2025, the town council (German:Stadtrat) consists of 20 elected members (including mayor and vice mayor) from the following parties:

- Free Voters of Monheim (German: Freie Wähler Monheim), PWG: 4
- Monheimer Umland Liste, MUM: 6
- Christian Social Union of Bavaria, CSU: 7
- Social Democratic Party of Germany, SPD: 3

== Economy ==
The town largely depends on light industry, with the Hama company being one of the main employers, having relocated from Dresden to Monheim after the second world war.

Agriculture is still an important factor with about half of the surrounding land used for it.

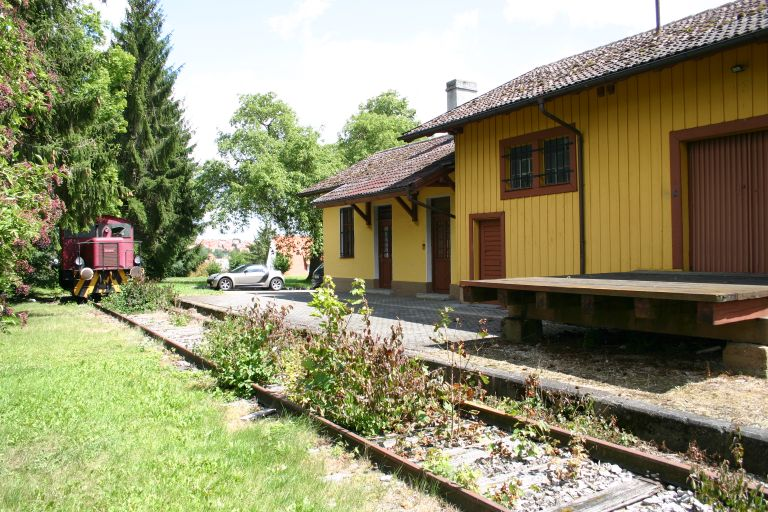
The old railway station

== Road and rail connections ==
Monheim lies on the Bundesstrasse 2, the Federal Road No. 2. The B2 used to go straight through town until a bypass was built in the early 1990s. The road from Neuburg to Nördlingen, which passes through the outskirts of Monheim, is not a Federal road.

The nearest train line is nowadays in Fünfstetten, the Augsburg–Nürnberg line. From there, a 5.6 km long side track used to run to Monheim, built in 1905–06, but passenger service was suspended in 1960 and goods services in the 1990s. During the 1980s, a historic train used to operate on the line on selected summer weekends. Footage of this train was used in the 1983 German movie Der Glockenkrieg.

The train line has now been completely removed and only the railway station is still in place, now home to the local pigeon breeders club.

== Sport ==
The local sports club, TSV Monheim, has a strong tradition in artistic gymnastics, being one of the centres of the sport in Germany. Its team competes at the highest national level of the sport, often attracting foreign athletes, especially from Brazil. In April 2008, the town hosted a four-nations under-18's tournament with Germany, France, the UK and Switzerland participating.

Warching, one of the neighboring villages, is home to a motocross track and club, the MV Warching, formed in 1973. The club has a strong sidecarcross tradition, having had many of its members race at world championship level. Through Hubert Rebele and Alois Wenninger, the club archived four runners-up spots in this competition in the 1980s and 90's. The track was also the venue for the 1985 German sidecarcross Grand Prix, the only time it was held in Warching.

== Festivals ==
Like many towns in Bavaria which preserved their old town centre, Monheim hosts a historical Town Festival (German:Historisches Stadtfest). It is staged every second year.

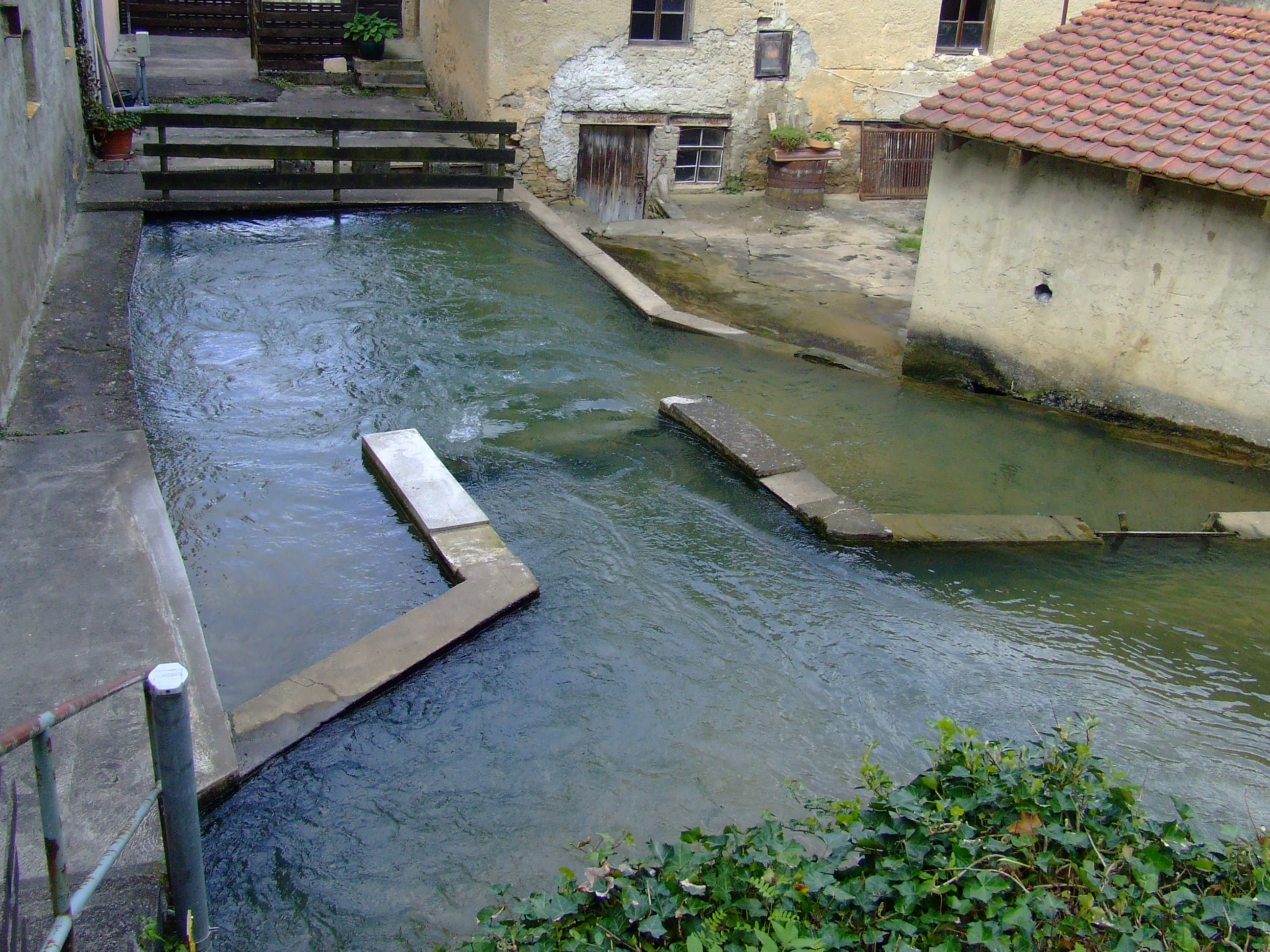
Karst spring of the Gailach at Mühlheim

== Hortulus Monheimensis ==
'Hortulus Monheimensis' is a florilegium of watercolour sketches commissioned in 1615 by Wolfgang Philippus Brandt, the local governor or magistrate. It is a singular record of the Renaissance garden of the Monheim Palace. The work is hosted by the Bavarian State Library and may have been inspired by the 'Hortus Eystettensis' of 1613.

== Geology of the Monheim region ==
Monheim lies at the edge of the region of the Solnhofen limestone in what was once the Tethys Ocean. Fossil crocodiles, such as Geosaurus, Cricosaurus, Rhacheosaurus and Steneosaurus are all known from quarries near Monheim, while Archaeopteryx was found in the region around Solnhofen. The Gailach, the little river who runs through Monheim, disappears in the ground to travel underneath the surface shortly after passing Warching and resurfaces in Mühlheim, approximately 4 km further on. The reason for this is the limestone in the region, which makes sinkholes a very common site. A marked trail, the Karstlehrpfad Monheimer Alb with signs in German explaining the origins of the landscape and the geology.

== Local Dialect ==
The local dialect of the region is Alemannic German, referred to in German as Schwäbisch, with Monheim being at the most northeastern point of its extension. Traveling north, the villages beyond Monheim speak East Franconian German dialects while to the east, Bavarian is spoken.
