= Stairway to Heaven (2007 film) =

Film about Islamic art

- Written by: Lynette Singer
- Produced by: André Singer
- Starring: HRH The Prince of Wales; HRH Prince Ghazi; Christopher Frayling; Khaled Azzam; Keith Critchlow; Minwer al-Meheid
- Narrated by: Kenneth Branagh
- Cinematography: Michael Miles
- Edited by: Roy Deverell
- Music by: Nainita Desai; Malcolm Laws
- Production companies: West Park Pictures; The Prince's Charities
- Distributed by: DCD Media
- Release date: April 30, 2007 (London)
- Running time: 53 minutes
- Country: United Kingdom
- Language: English

Stairway to Heaven: Rebuilding the Minbar of Saladin is a 2007 documentary film by André Singer about the reconstruction and restoration of the Minbar of Saladin after it had been destroyed in the 1969 Al-Aqsa mosque fire.

Narrated by Kenneth Branagh, the film covers the work of craftspeople in Jordan and Palestine in the restoration, and is notable for the support and participation of King Abdullah II of Jordan and The Prince of Wales (later King Charles III).

The film features The Prince of Wales, Prince Ghazi bin Muhammad of Jordan, Christopher Frayling, Khaled Azzam and Keith Critchlow of The Prince's School of Traditional Arts, and Minwer al-Meheid.

The film was also supported by Mohammed Abdul Latif Jameel KBE, founder and chairman of Community Jameel.

== Reception ==
The film opened with a royal world premiere on 30 April 2007 at the Odeon Leicester Square in London, attended by The Prince of Wales and Princess Badiya bint Hassan of Jordan.

Stairway to Heaven won a Special Jury Remi Award at the 2008 41st WorldFest-Houston International Film Festival, was shortlisted for the best spiritual documentary award at the European Spiritual Film Festival, and was included in 'The best at last' selection at the 2008 4th Globians Film Festival in Potsdam, Germany.

The film was screened by the Royal Collection at the Queen's Gallery at Buckingham Palace on 22 January 2015, with an introduction by André Singer and the Royal Collection director Jonathan Marsden.

A copy of the film is included in the Sir Kenneth Branagh Archive Collection at Queen's University Belfast with catalogue number MS 41/6/10 24a.
