= Wemding =

- Municipality
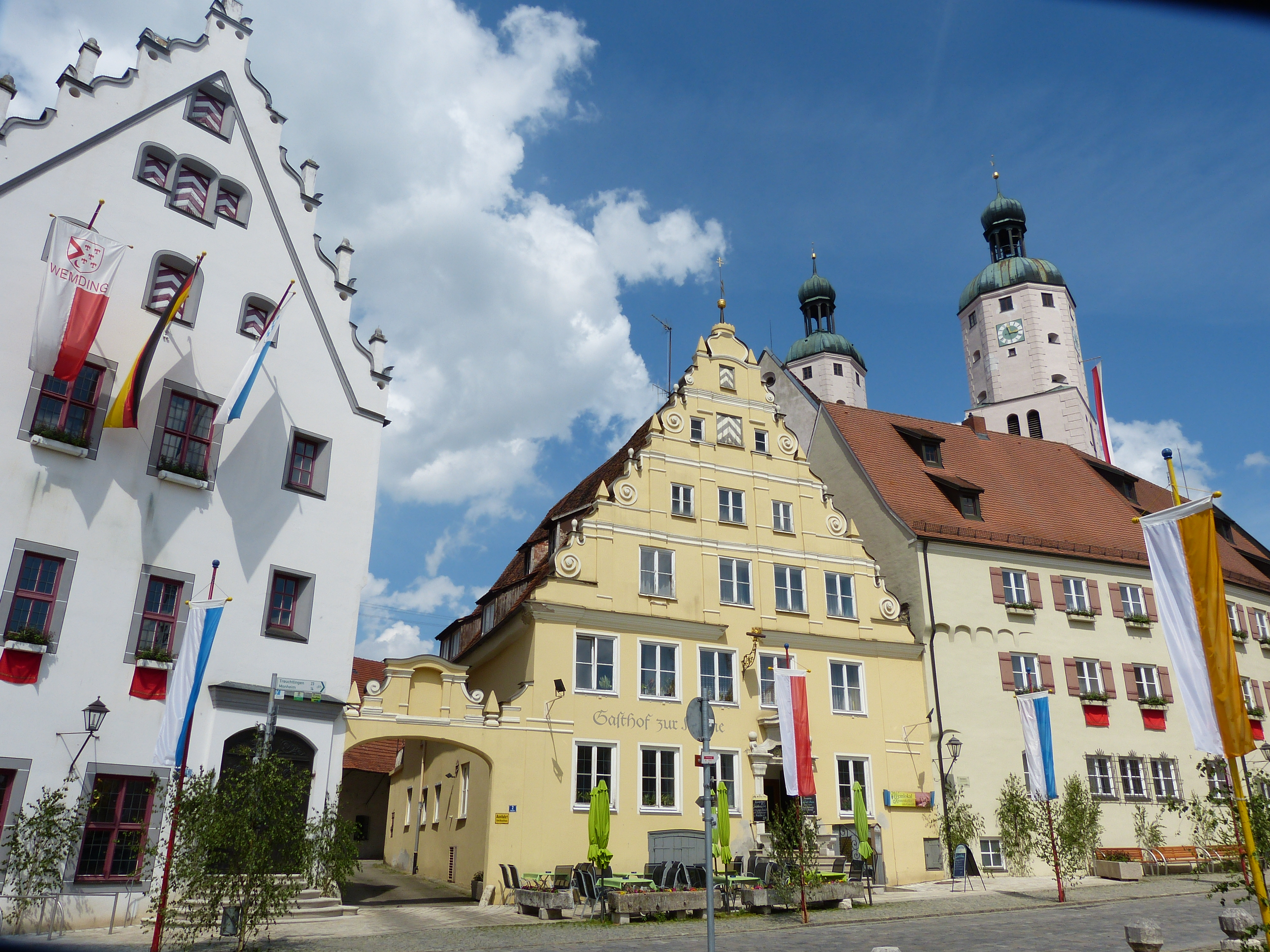
- Historical market square

- Coat of arms

- Location of Wemding within Donau-Ries district
- Interactive map of Wemding
- Location within Germany Location within Bavaria
- Coordinates: 48°52′N 10°43′E
- Country: Germany
- State: Bavaria
- Admin. region: Schwaben
- District: Donau-Ries
- Municipal assoc.: Wemding

Government
  - Mayor (2020–26): Martin Drexler

Area
  - Total: 31.6 km^{2} (12.2 sq mi)
- Elevation: 463 m (1,519 ft)

Population (2025-12-31)
  - Total: 5,742
  - Density: 182/km^{2} (471/sq mi)
- Time zone: UTC+01:00 (CET)
  - Summer (DST): UTC+02:00 (CEST)
- Postal codes: 86650
- Dialling codes: 09092
- Vehicle registration: DON
- Website: www.wemding.de

Wemding (German pronunciation: [ˈvɛmdɪŋ]; Alemannic German: Wendi) is a town in the Donau-Ries district of Bavaria, Germany. Wemding is situated on the edge of the Ries meteorite crater in the Geopark Ries.

== History ==
The town of Wemding was founded in 793, documented as "Uuemodinga" in a donation deed from Count Helmoin Gosheim. In 1467, the city passed into the possession of Duke Ludwig the Rich of Bavaria. The city was besieged by the Kingdom of Sweden in 1632 during the Thirty Years' War.

Wemding is the location of the Zeitpyramide (Time pyramid), a public art work begun in 1993 and scheduled to be completed in 3183. The most recent block, which was the fourth block, was placed on 9 September 2023, and the next block will be placed in 2033. This project has been noted for falling victim to the fence post problem.

== Notable people ==
- Leonhart Fuchs (1501–1566), born in Wemding, physician and botanist. The botanical genus Fuchsia is named in his honour.
- Veit Amerbach, also Vitus Amerpachius, (1503–1557), born in Wemding, was a theologian, scholar and humanist.
- Luitgard Im (1930–1997), born and died in Wemding, theater and film actress.
