= George Kenner =

German artist

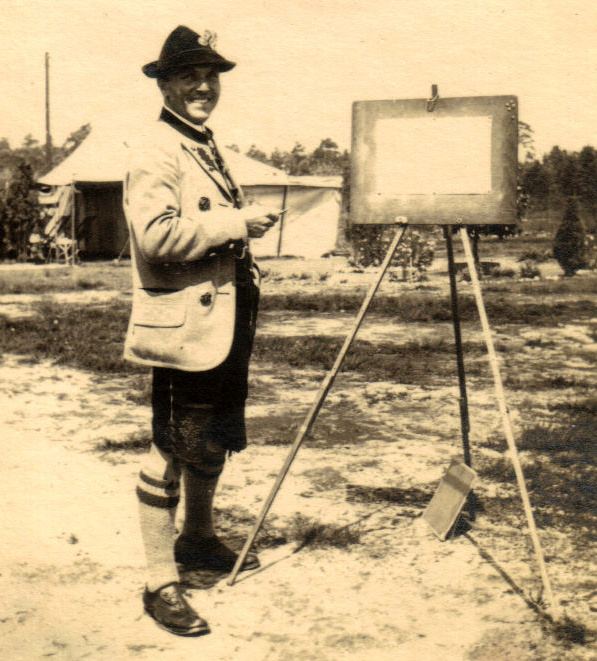
- POW artist George Kenner at Frith Hill tent camp in 1915.
- Born: Georg Kennerknecht; 1 November 1888; Schwabsoien, Weilheim-Schongau, Bavaria, Germany
- Died: 10 July 1971 (aged 82); Cheltenham, Pennsylvania, United States
- Known for: painting, drawing
- Spouse: Margarete Bohne Kenner (1921–1963; her death)

George Kenner (1 November 1888 – 10 July 1971) was a German artist. He made 110 paintings and drawings during the First World War while interned as a German civilian internee in Great Britain and the Isle of Man.

== Birth and background ==
Kenner was born Georg Kennerknecht on November 1, 1888, in the small town of Schwabsoien, near the Alps in the Weilheim-Schongau district of Bavaria, Germany. He went to art school in Germany. He moved to London in 1910. He worked at and co-owned the small "process artist" company Waddington & Kennerknecht at 73 Farringdon Street with a British partner. He also attended night school at London's Lambeth School of Art to study airbrush techniques. He was registered as an "alien enemy" on August 23, 1914, then abruptly interned five days after the RMS Lusitania was sunk by a German U-boat on May 7, 1915.

Being a trained commercial artist by profession, and wanting to stay in practice with his work, he negotiated with the PoW camp authorities to be allowed to create what became the most extensive collection of World War I internment scenes known.

== History of internment ==
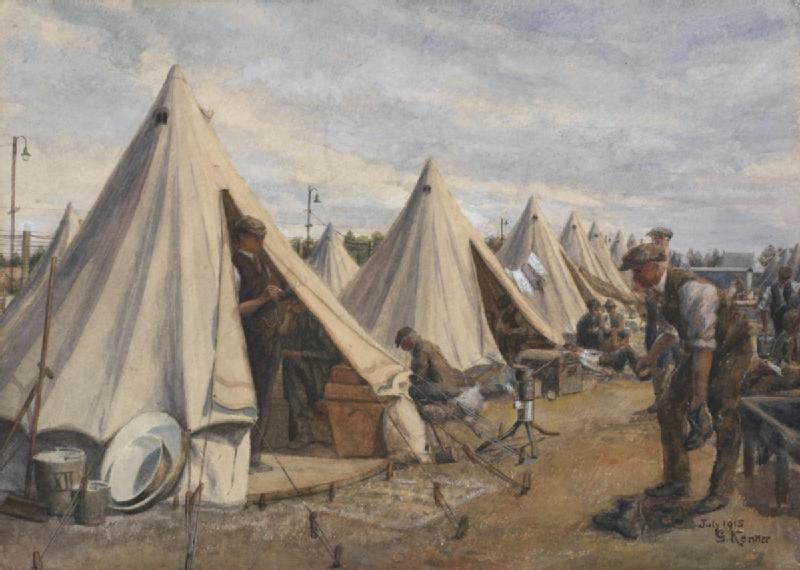
P.O.W. Camp, A Sunday Morning. Frith Hill POW tent camp, near Frimley, in Surrey, England, July 1915.

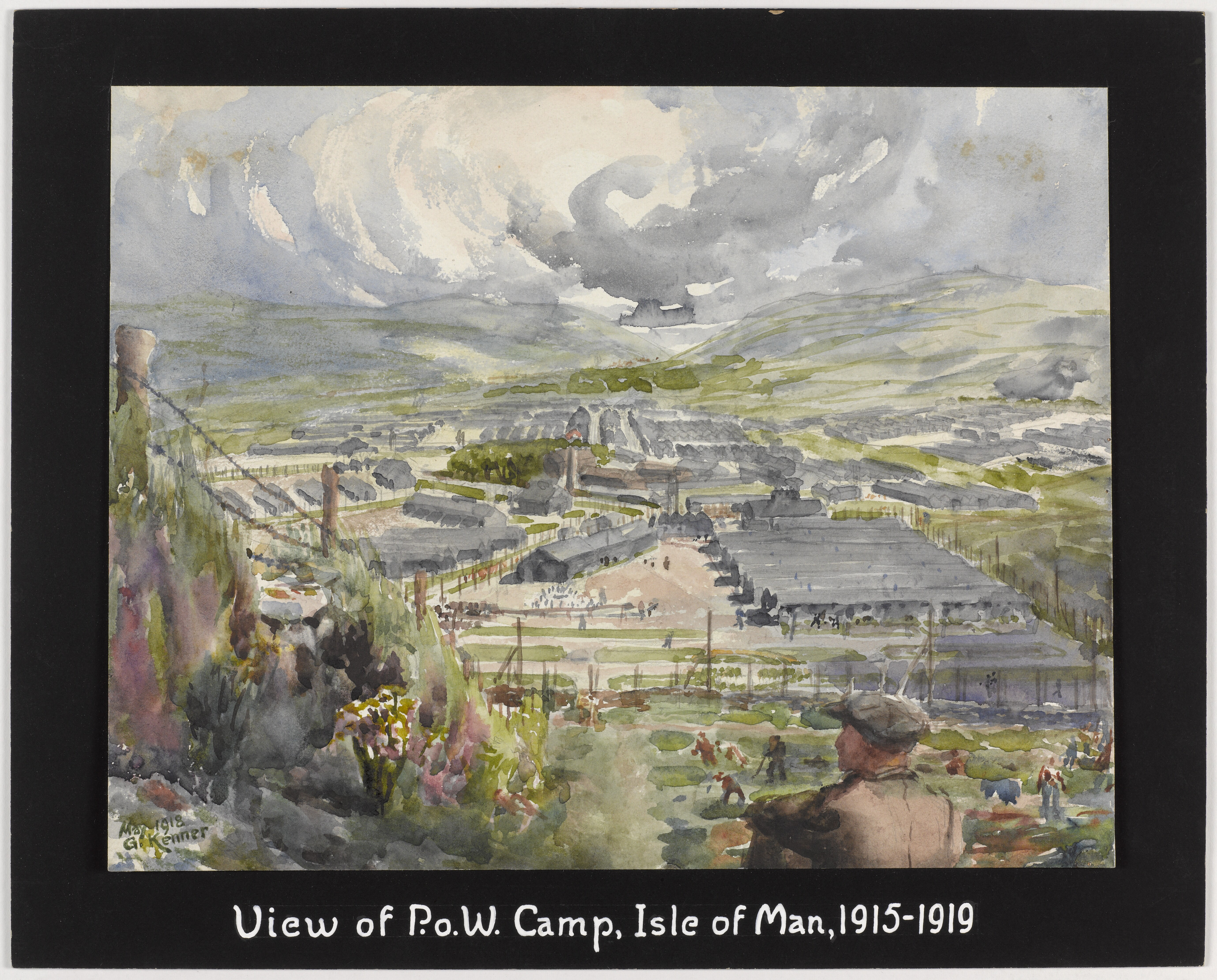
View of P.O.W. Camp, Isle of Man. The Knockaloe internment camp near Peel on the Isle of Man, May 1918.

Kenner was held at three camps, and recorded scenes from each in his artwork: On May 12, 1915, he was first sent to a temporary tent camp built on Frith Hill, on an area which is now part of the Pine Ridge Golf Centre, near Frimley, in Surrey. The camp grew to hold 2,000 civilian prisoners, but was considered unsuitable for the approaching winter. On September 29, 1915, Kenner was sent to Alexandra Palace in North London. 3,000 internees were held in three sections. Conditions were better here. In June 1916, Kenner was sent to the Knockaloe internment camp near Peel on the Isle of Man in the Irish Sea. This camp held 30,000 civilian prisoners for the remainder of the war and beyond. He was finally sent back to Germany in a prisoner exchange in March 1919, four months after the Armistice.

== Family and later history ==
Kenner married artist Margarete Bohne in Munich on September 8, 1921. Two of their first three children died in the 1920s due to bad post-war conditions in Germany. They eventually were able to emigrate to the United States in September 1927, sailing from the port of Hamburg, Germany, to Ellis Island, New York. They settled in Cheltenham, Pennsylvania. There Kenner set up a successful business working out of his home as an independent commercial artist. Kenner and his family were naturalized as American citizens in 1934. A fourth child, Christa Kenner Bedford, was born in 1937. Kenner died of natural causes at his home on July 10, 1971, at age 82.

== Disposition of artwork ==
Many of his drawings, hand-written journal, business card, Lambeth School of Art tuition slips, immigration and "alien enemy" registration documents were accepted into the Imperial War Museum in London, in October 2005.

Three other British museums acquired the art that Kenner produced in their particular areas during the war: the Surrey Heath Museum, in Camberley, the Manx National Heritage Museum in Douglas, Isle of Man, and Bruce Castle Museum in London.

Several of Kenner's paintings from his Frith Hill PoW camp period were used in the book Reflections – A Heatherside Miscellany by Nick McCormick, published in June 2006.

Several other paintings from Kenner's Alexandra Palace PoW period were used in the book Ally Pally Prison Camp by Maggie Butt, published in June 2011.

== Gallery ==
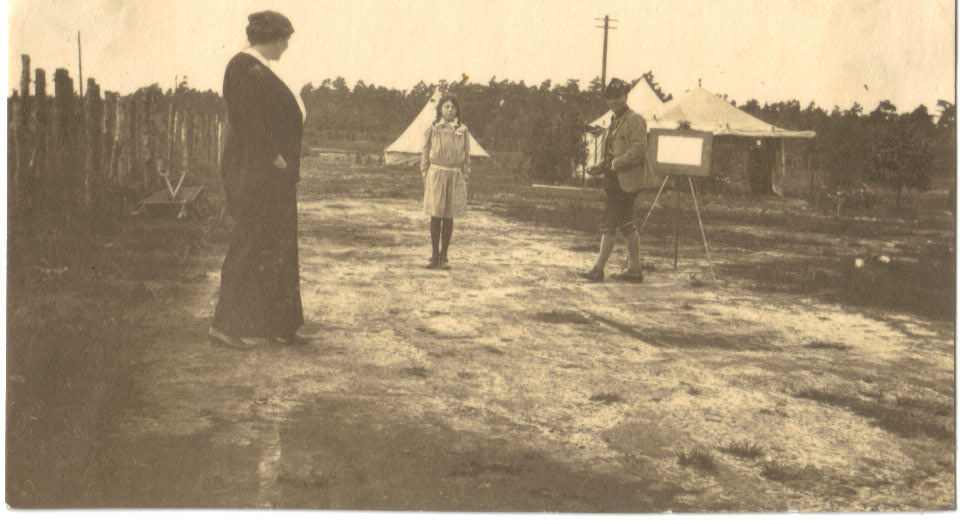
George Kenner painting British POW camp commander's wife and daughter at Frith Hill POW tent camp near Frimley, in Surrey, England, 1915.

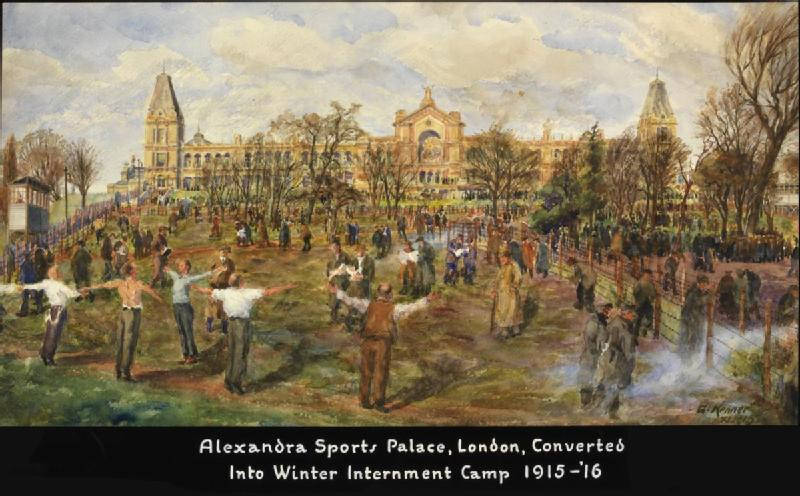
Alexandra Sports Palace, London, Converted into Winter Internment Camp, November 1915.

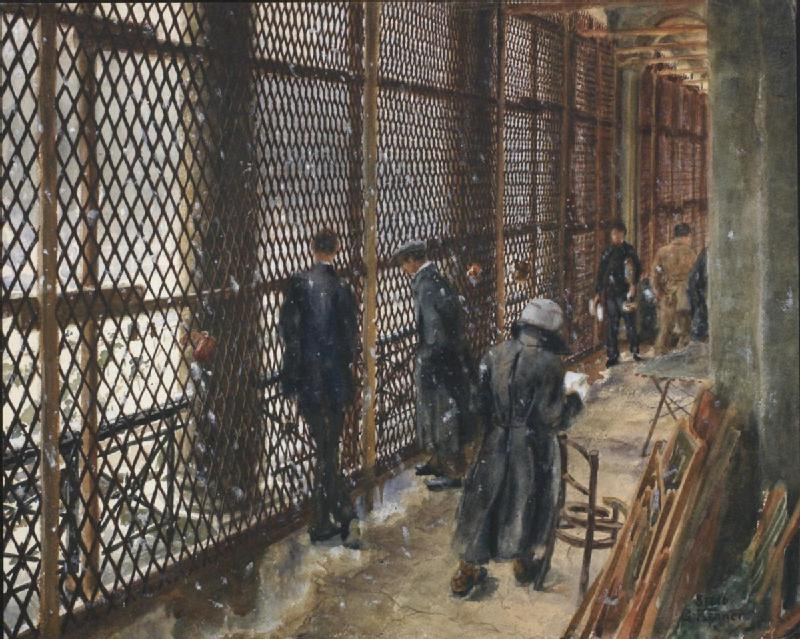
Wired-off Terrace for Exercise in Bad Weather for Civilian Pows at Alexandra Palace, February 1916.

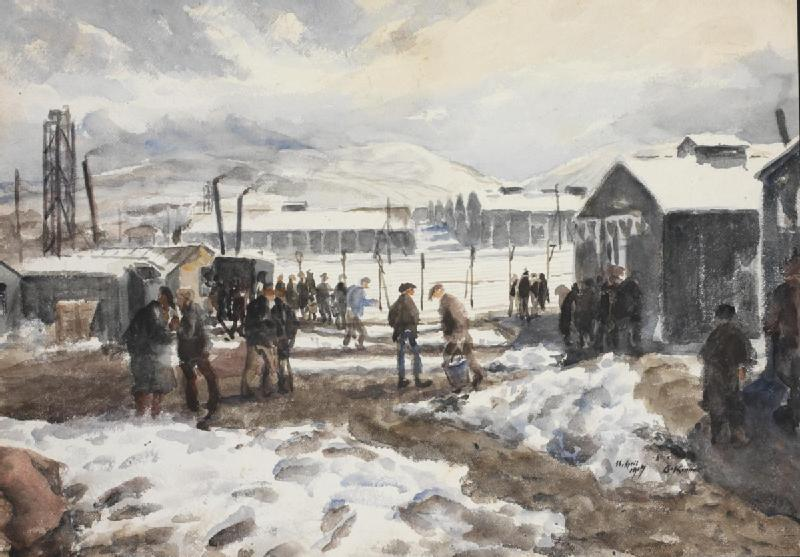
Overnight Snowfall Melting into Slush at the Knockaloe internment camp on the Isle of Man, April 1917.

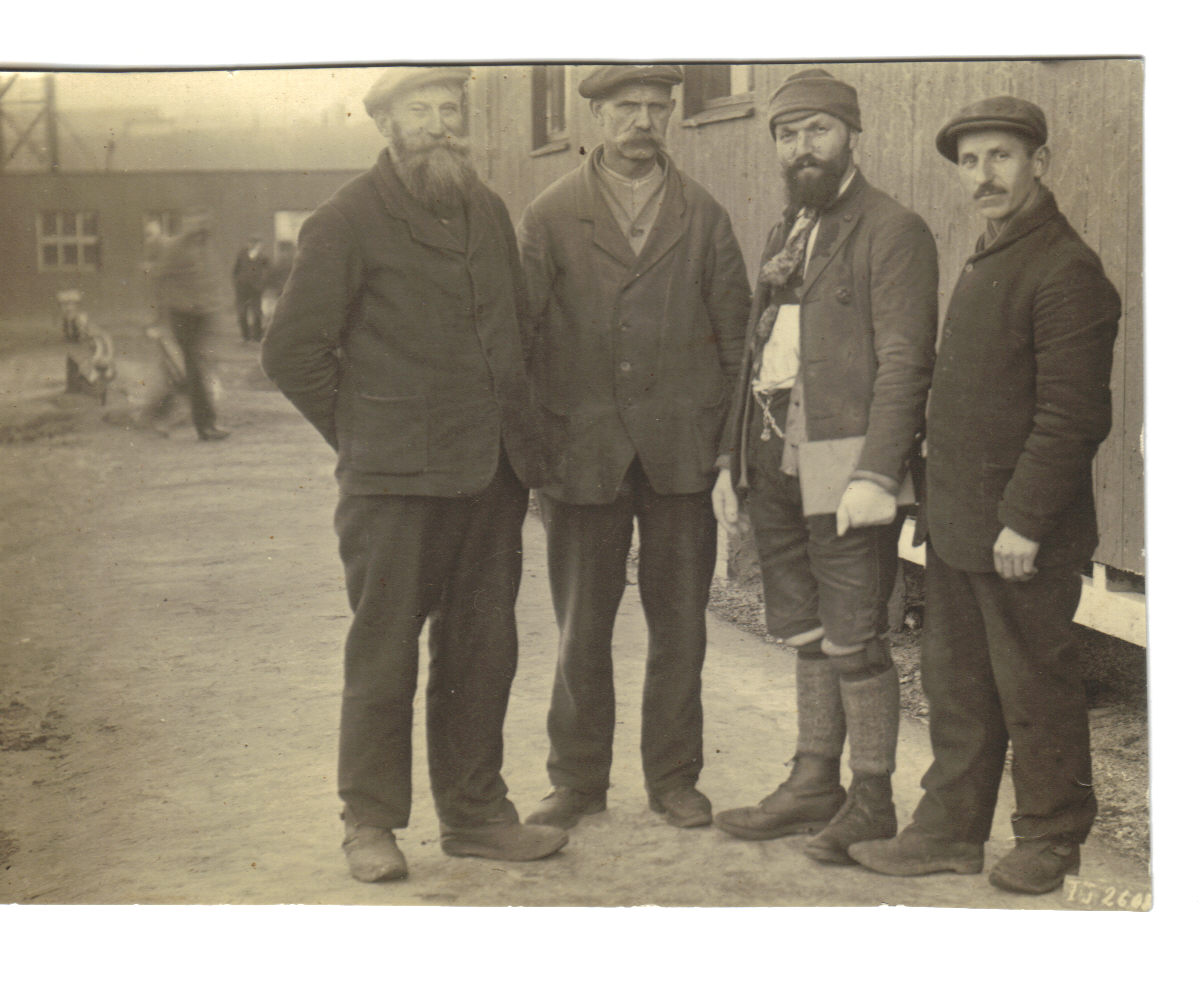
George Kenner (2nd from right) with his younger brother Benno (far right) and fellow interns at the Knockaloe internment camp on the Isle of Man, February 1918.

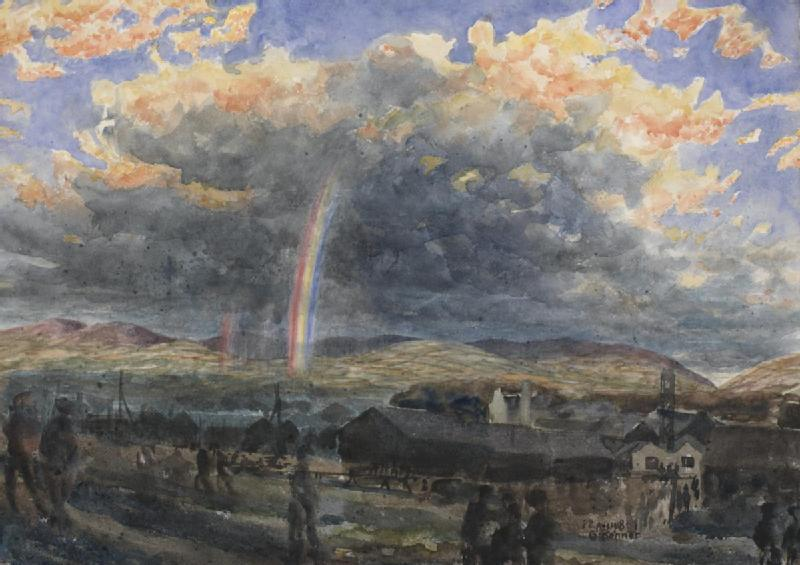
Storm and Rainbow, Symbol for Near End of War, Knockaloe internment camp on the Isle of Man, August 1918.

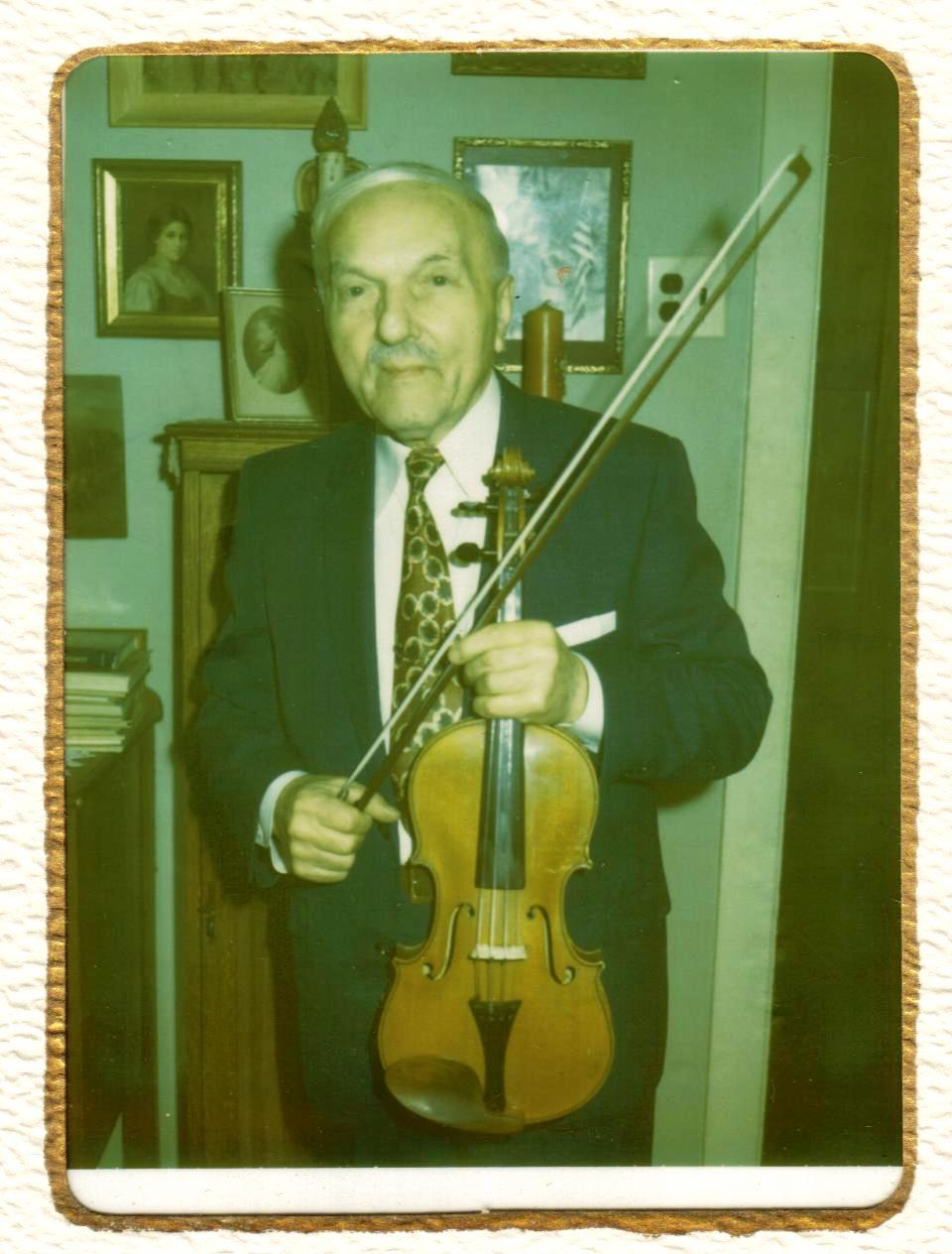
George Kenner, former World War I POW, with his violin on his 81st birthday at his residence in Cheltenham, Pennsylvania, November 1, 1969.
