= Schonach =

Schonach or Schönach may refer to:

- Schonach im Schwarzwald, a town in the district of Schwarzwald-Baar in Baden-Württemberg, Germany
- Schonach, a district of Creglingen, a town in the Main-Tauber district of Baden-Württemberg, Germany
- Herdwangen-Schönach, a municipality in the district of Sigmaringen in Baden-Württemberg, Germany
- Schönach, a river of Bavaria, Germany, tributary of the Lech
