= Eyach =

Eyach may refer to:

- Eyach (Ammer), a river of Bavaria, Germany, tributary of the Ammer
- Eyach (Neckar), a river of Baden-Württemberg, Germany, tributary of the Neckar
- Eyach (Enz), a river of Baden-Württemberg, Germany, tributary of the Enz
- Eyach (Eutingen), a district of the town Eutingen im Gäu, Baden-Württemberg, Germany
- Eyach virus, a viral infection
