= Altenstadt (Verwaltungsgemeinschaft, Upper Bavaria) =

- Verwaltungsgemeinschaft
- Location of Altenstadt within Weilheim-Schongau district
- Interactive map of Altenstadt
- Location within Germany Location within Bavaria
- Coordinates: 47°49′N 10°53′E
- Country: Germany
- State: Bavaria
- Admin. region: Upper Bavaria
- District: Weilheim-Schongau
- Seat: Altenstadt
- Subdivisions: 5 municipalities

Area
  - Total: 72.79 km^{2} (28.10 sq mi)

Population (2025-12-31)
  - Total: 8,566
  - Density: 117.7/km^{2} (304.8/sq mi)
- Time zone: UTC+01:00 (CET)
  - Summer (DST): UTC+02:00 (CEST)
- Website: www.vg-altenstadt.de

Altenstadt is a Verwaltungsgemeinschaft (municipal association) in the district Weilheim-Schongau in Bavaria, Germany. Its seat is in Altenstadt.

It consists of the following municipalities:

1. Altenstadt
2. Hohenfurch
3. Ingenried
4. Schwabbruck
5. Schwabsoien
