= Uffing am Staffelsee station =

Railway station in Bavaria

Uffing am Staffelsee
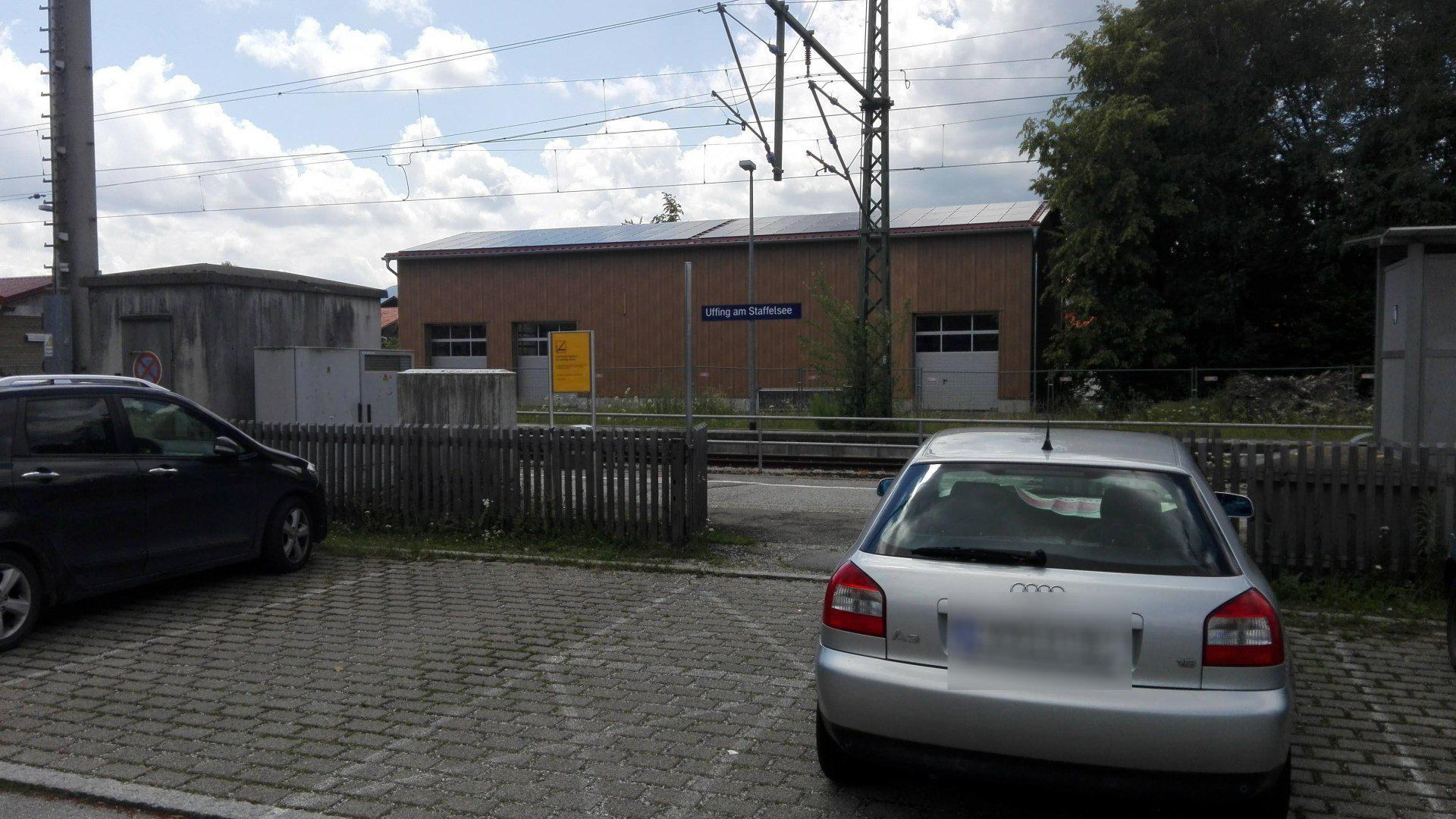
- The station in 2018

General information
- Location: Uffing am Staffelsee, Bavaria; Germany
- Coordinates: 47°43′12″N 11°09′32″E
- Owner: DB Netz
- Operator: DB Station&Service
- Lines: Munich–Garmisch-Partenkirchen line (KBS 960)
- Distance: 69.3 km (43.1 mi) from München Hauptbahnhof
- Platforms: 2 side platforms
- Tracks: 2
- Train operators: DB Regio Bayern
- Connections: Regionalverkehr Oberbayern buses

Other information
- Station code: 6312
- DS100 code: MHUG
- IBNR: 8005948
- Category: 5

Services
Preceding station	DB Regio Bayern	Following station
Murnau towards Innsbruck Hbf	RB 6	Huglfing towards München Hbf
Murnau towards Pfronten-Steinach	RB 60	Huglfing towards München Hbf
Location

Uffing am Staffelsee station (German: Bahnhof Uffing am Staffelsee) is a railway station in the municipality of Uffing am Staffelsee, in Bavaria, Germany. It is located on the Munich–Garmisch-Partenkirchen railway of Deutsche Bahn.

== Services ==
As of the December 2021 timetable change, the following services stop at Uffing am Staffelsee:

- RB: hourly service between München Hauptbahnhof and Garmisch-Partenkirchen; some trains continue from Garmisch-Partenkirchen to Pfronten-Steinach, Mittenwald, Seefeld in Tirol, or Innsbruck.
