= Maggie Butt =

British poet and novelist

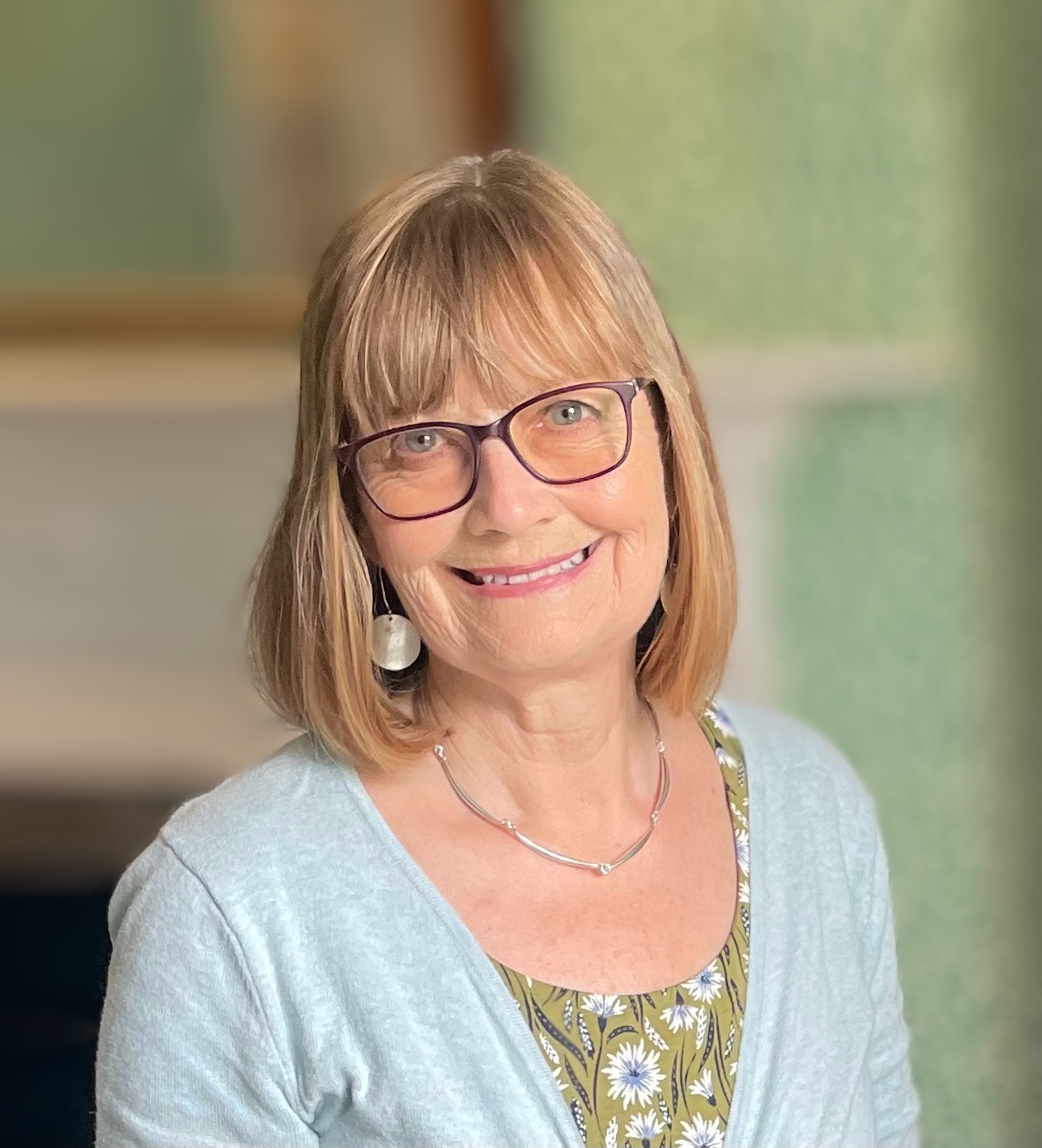
Maggie Brookes-Butt, poet and novelist

Maggie Brookes-Butt is a British poet and novelist.

== Background ==
Maggie Brookes-Butt is an ex-journalist and BBC TV producer turned poet and novelist. Her seventh poetry collection is Wish - new and selected poems (Greenwich Exchange) January 2025. Her sixth collection everlove, was published in April 2021 as Maggie Butt by The London Magazine. Her first historical novel, The Prisoner's Wife was published in 2020 under her maiden name Maggie Brookes. It was published by imprints of Penguin Random House in the UK, Australia, New Zealand, USA and Canada and also in the Czech Republic, Poland, Portugal, Mexico and the Netherlands. Her second historical novel Acts of Love and War, was published internationally in 2022.

She has been a Royal Literary Fund fellow and Associate Professor at Middlesex University, where she taught creative writing for 30 years. Her poetry has been published in international magazines and anthologies and been turned into choreography and a mobile phone app as well as set to music. She has judged many poetry competitions.

After completing an English degree, Maggie (then Brookes) became a newspaper reporter at the Kingsbridge Gazette , and Hendon Times moving to BBC TV as a documentary writer, producer and director. She later returned to her first love of poetry and fiction, completing a PhD in creative writing from Cardiff University.

Maggie Butt's first poetry pamphlet, Quintana Roo, was published by Acumen Publications in 2003. Her first full collection of poetry, Lipstick, was published in March 2007 by Greenwich Exchange; a launch event was held at Keats House in Hampstead, North London. Her edited collection of essays, Story - The Heart of the Matter, was also published by Greenwich Exchange in October 2007. An e-book and MP3, "I Am The Sphinx", were published by Snakeskin online poetry journal in 2009. Her collection of short poems, "petite", was published by Hearing Eye in 2010, and turned into a dance piece "Ashes" by choreographer Dr Lesley Main.

Ally Pally Prison Camp, published in June 2011 by Oversteps Books, charts the use of Alexandra Palace in North London as a 'concentration camp' for civilian enemy aliens during the First World War. It tells the story of the internees through black and white photographs, the paintings of internee George Kenner, extracts from memoirs and letters, and Maggie Butt's own poems. The poems and stories from Ally Pally Prison Camp have been recorded and brought alive for visitors to Alexandra Palace in a locative mobile phone app called Time Stood Still produced by Dr Helen Bendon.

Sancti Clandestini - Undercover Saints, published November 2012 by Ward-Wood Publications, is a fully illustrated poetry collection, which proposes some alternative, imaginary saints, including the Patron Saints of liars, looters, rank outsiders, compulsive hoarders, old dogs and infidel girls. These undercover Patron Saints were illustrated by the staff and students of Middlesex University's BA Hons Illustration course, from famous and established artists to emerging talents.'If the proof of a poem is in the richness of response it provokes, the illustrations here are that response made visible - a testimony to the subtle layers in this tender but incisive poetry.' Philip Gross

Degrees of Twilight was published by The London Magazine in July 2015. These poems use history, memory, work and travel as lenses to examine the inevitable pains and sharp pleasures at the heart of our transient lives.

everlove (2021) uses the artwork of Canadian artist Mary Behrens as inspiration for ekphrastic poems about the refugee crisis.

Wish - new and selected poems (2025)ncludes poems from Maggie's six previous collections – about the strength of women, concern for our planet, and hope in the power of love – are gathered here alongside bitter-sweet new poems about the joys and fears of a grandmother in this troubled, vulnerable and precious world.

Dr Maggie Butt was Chair of the National Association of Writers in Education (NAWE) from 2007-2012, and founding Principal Editor of the peer reviewed journal Writing in Practice.

Maggie lives in North London. She is married with two grown-up daughters and two grand-daughters.

== Books ==
- Quintana Roo, Maggie Butt (Acumen Publications 2003)
- Lipstick, Maggie Butt, (Greenwich Exchange 2007)
- Story - The Heart of the Matter, Maggie Butt (Greenwich Exchange 2007)
- Petite, Maggie Butt (Hearing Eye 2010)
- Ally Pally Prison Camp, Maggie Butt (Oversteps Books 2011)
- Sancti Clandestini - Undercover Saints, Maggie Butt (Ward-Wood 2012)
- Degrees of Twilight, Maggie Butt (The London Magazine, 2015)
- The Prisoner's Wife, Maggie Brookes (Penguin Random House 2020)
- everlove, Maggie Butt (The London Magazine, 2021)
- Acts of Love and War, Maggie Brookes (Penguin Random House 2022)
- Wish - new and selected poems Maggie Butt (Greenwich Exchange 2025)
