= Huglfing (Verwaltungsgemeinschaft) =

- Verwaltungsgemeinschaft
- Location of Huglfing within Weilheim-Schongau district
- Interactive map of Huglfing
- Location within Germany Location within Bavaria
- Coordinates: 47°46′N 11°09′E
- Country: Germany
- State: Bavaria
- Admin. region: Upper Bavaria
- District: Weilheim-Schongau
- Seat: Huglfing
- Subdivisions: 4 municipalities

Area
  - Total: 81.36 km^{2} (31.41 sq mi)

Population (2025-12-31)
  - Total: 7,729
  - Density: 95.00/km^{2} (246.0/sq mi)
- Time zone: UTC+01:00 (CET)
  - Summer (DST): UTC+02:00 (CEST)
- Website: www.vghuglfing.de

Huglfing is a Verwaltungsgemeinschaft (municipal association) in the district Weilheim-Schongau in Bavaria, Germany. Its seat is in Huglfing.

It consists of the following municipalities:

1. Eberfing
2. Eglfing
3. Huglfing
4. Oberhausen
