= Schönach =

River in Germany

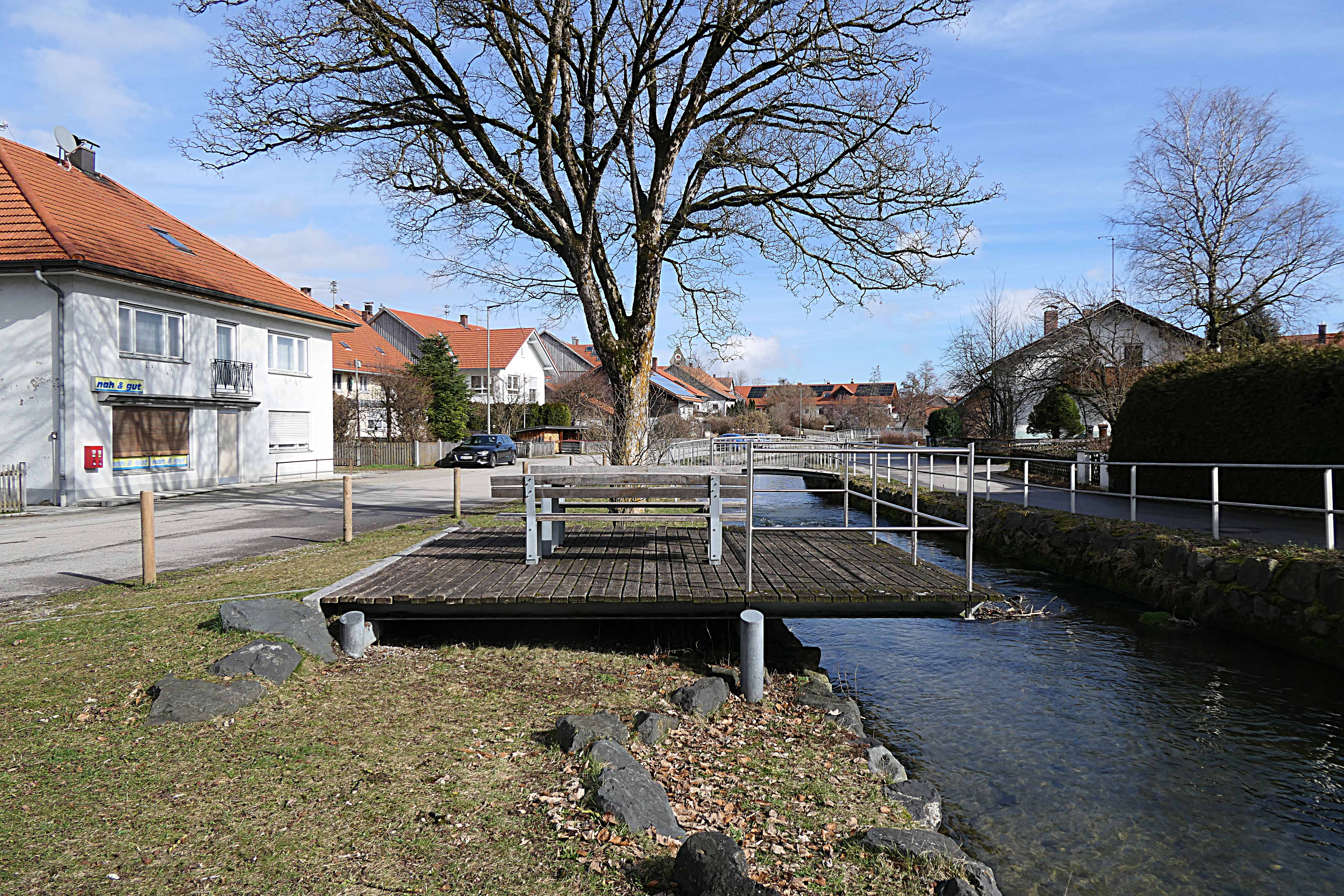
- The Schönach in Hohenfurch

Location
- Country: Germany
- State: Bavaria

Physical characteristics
- Mouth
  - location: Lech
  - coordinates: 47.8539°N 10.9243°E
- Length: 14.0 km (8.7 mi)

Basin features
- Progression: Lech→ Danube→ Black Sea

Schönach is a river of Bavaria, Germany. It is a left tributary of the Lech near Hohenfurch.

== See also ==
- List of rivers of Bavaria
