= Steingaden (Verwaltungsgemeinschaft) =

- Verwaltungsgemeinschaft
- Location of Steingaden within Weilheim-Schongau district
- Interactive map of Steingaden
- Location within Germany Location within Bavaria
- Coordinates: 47°42′N 10°52′E
- Country: Germany
- State: Bavaria
- Admin. region: Upper Bavaria
- District: Weilheim-Schongau
- Seat: Steingaden
- Subdivisions: 3 municipalities

Area
  - Total: 127.64 km^{2} (49.28 sq mi)

Population (2025-12-31)
  - Total: 5,273
  - Density: 41.31/km^{2} (107.0/sq mi)
- Time zone: UTC+01:00 (CET)
  - Summer (DST): UTC+02:00 (CEST)
- Website: www.vg-steingaden.de

Steingaden is a Verwaltungsgemeinschaft (municipal association) in the district Weilheim-Schongau in Bavaria, Germany. Its seat is in Steingaden.

It consists of the following municipalities:

1. Prem
2. Steingaden
3. Wildsteig
