= Polling, Weilheim-Schongau =

Polling
- Municipality
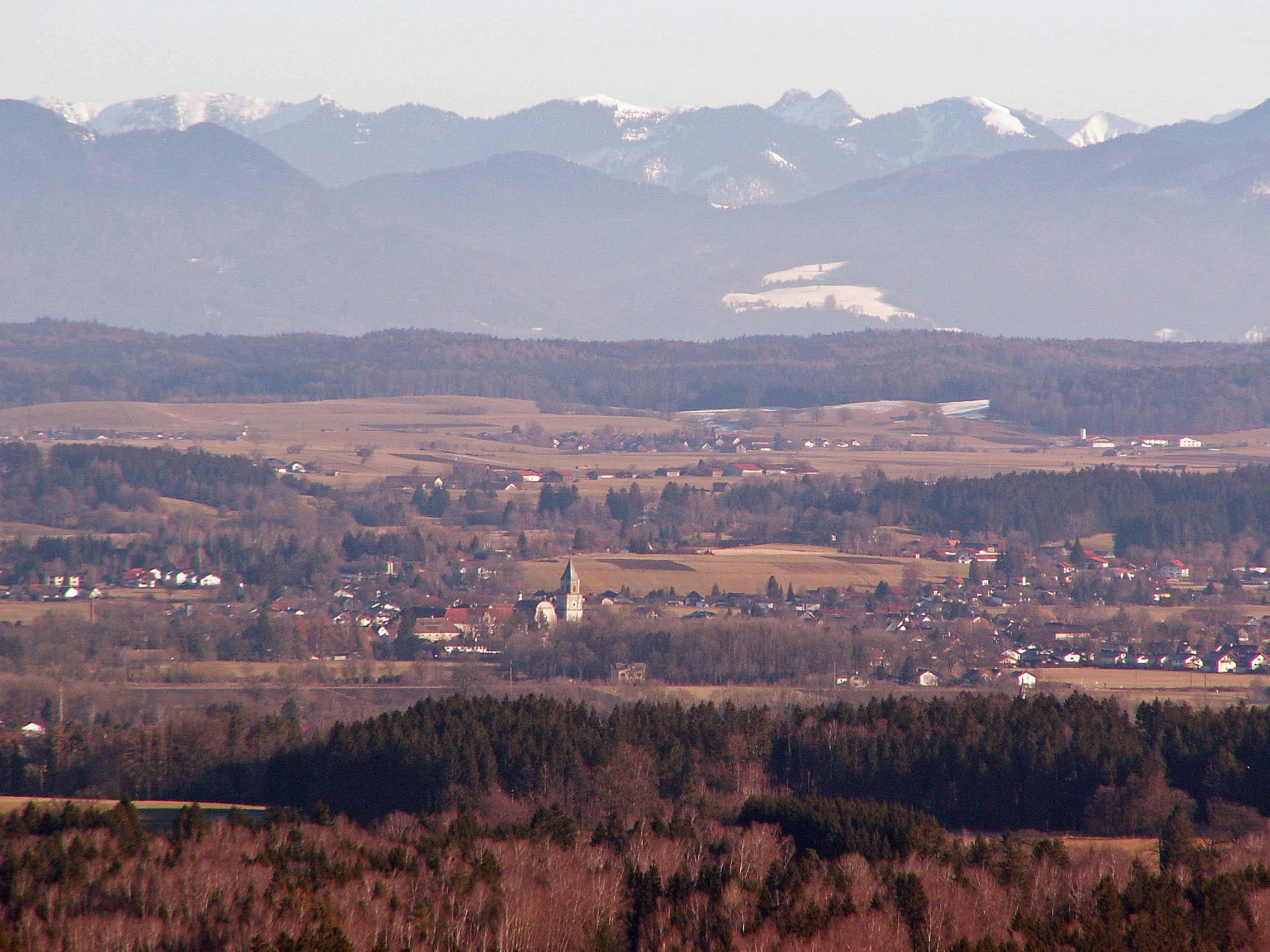
- Polling seen from the west

- Coat of arms

- Location of Polling within Weilheim-Schongau district
- Interactive map of Polling
- Location within Germany Location within Bavaria
- Coordinates: 47°48′40″N 11°7′51″E
- Country: Germany
- State: Bavaria
- Admin. region: Upper Bavaria
- District: Weilheim-Schongau

Government
  - Mayor (2020–26): Martin Pape

Area
  - Total: 29.22 km^{2} (11.28 sq mi)
- Elevation: 567 m (1,860 ft)

Population (2025-12-31)
  - Total: 3,635
  - Density: 124.4/km^{2} (322.2/sq mi)
- Time zone: UTC+01:00 (CET)
  - Summer (DST): UTC+02:00 (CEST)
- Postal codes: 82398
- Dialling codes: 0881
- Vehicle registration: WM
- Website: www.polling.de

Polling (German pronunciation: [ˈpɔlɪŋ]) is a municipality in the Weilheim-Schongau district, in Bavaria, Germany.

It is the birthplace of the 12th century theologian Gerhoh of Reichersberg.

== Geography ==
Polling lies in the region Bayerisches Oberland and belongs to the Landkreis Weilheim-Schongau. The river Ammer flows through the region with the Tiefenbach running through Polling. The municipality Polling consists of three subdivisions, Polling, Etting, and Oderding.
