= Altenstadt, Upper Bavaria =

Altenstadt
- Municipality
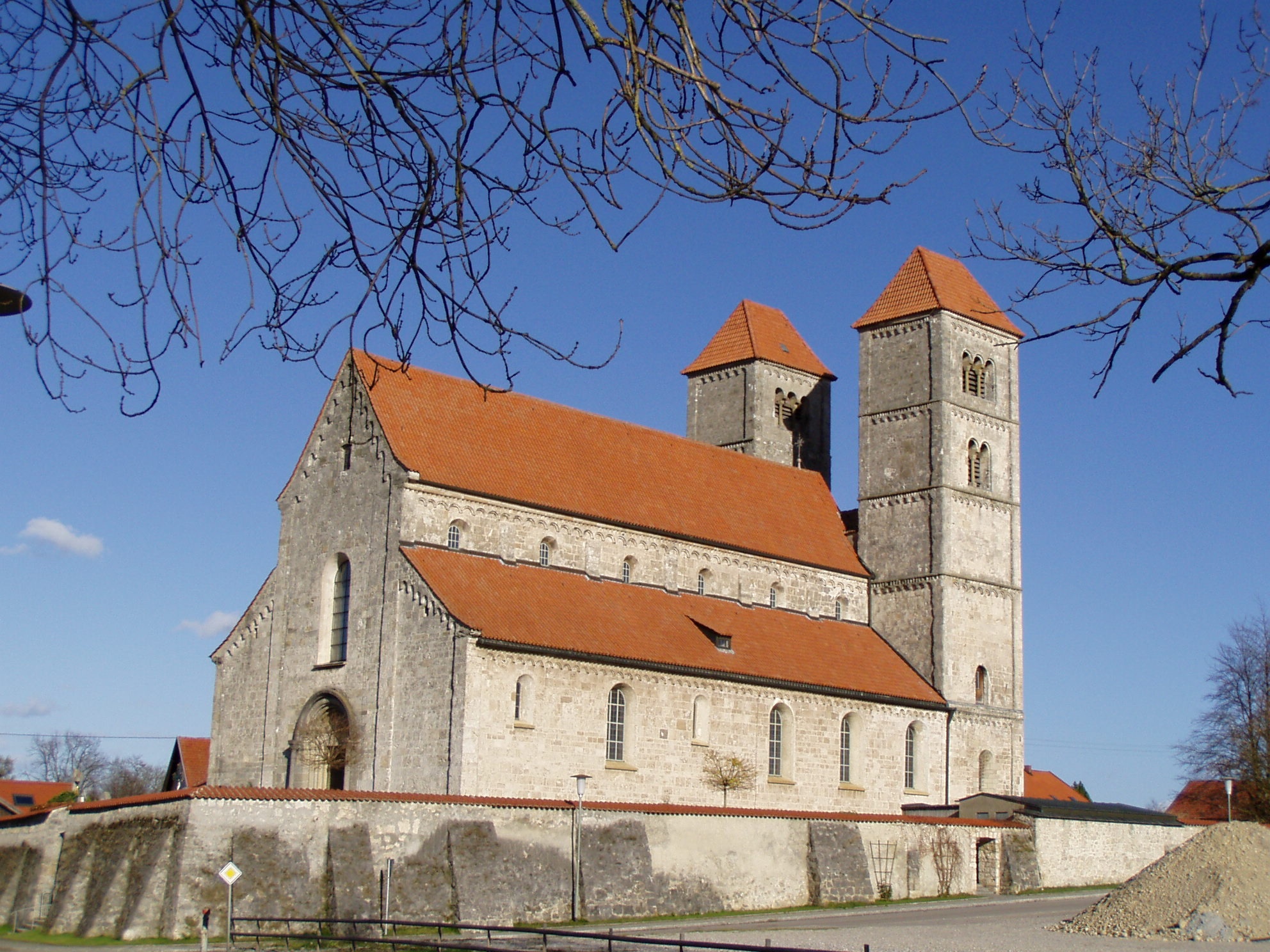
- Basilica of St. Michael

- Coat of arms

- Location of Altenstadt within Weilheim-Schongau district
- Interactive map of Altenstadt
- Location within Germany Location within Bavaria
- Coordinates: 47°49′N 10°52′E
- Country: Germany
- State: Bavaria
- Admin. region: Upper Bavaria
- District: Weilheim-Schongau
- Municipal assoc.: Altenstadt

Government
  - Mayor (2020–26): Andreas Kögl

Area
  - Total: 18.66 km^{2} (7.20 sq mi)
- Elevation: 722 m (2,369 ft)

Population (2025-12-31)
  - Total: 3,272
  - Density: 175.3/km^{2} (454.2/sq mi)
- Time zone: UTC+01:00 (CET)
  - Summer (DST): UTC+02:00 (CEST)
- Postal codes: 86972
- Dialling codes: 08861
- Vehicle registration: WM
- Website: www.altenstadt-obb.de

Altenstadt (German pronunciation: [ˈaltn̩ʃtat]) is a municipality in the Weilheim-Schongau district, in Bavaria, Germany.

== History ==
Of ancient Roman origins, the town was mostly abandoned in the 13th century. The inhabitants moved to a more secure new settlement located kilometers further away at the River Lech, also named Schongau. The old town was rechristened "Altenstadt", meaning "Old City" in German.

A significant sight is the Romanesque basilica minor of St. Michael with remains of medieval wall painting and several examples of Romanesque sculpture.
