= Eglfing =

- Municipality
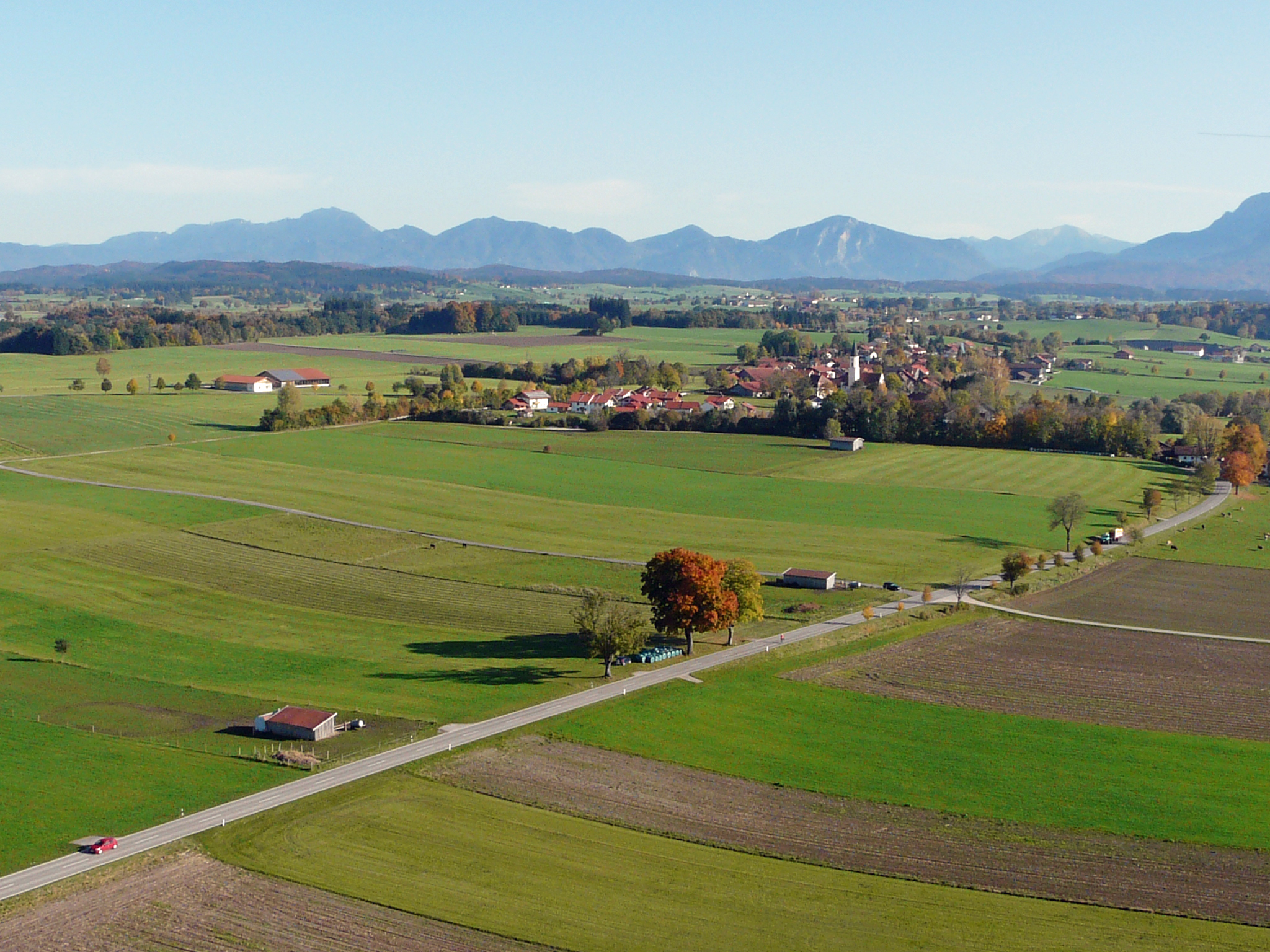
- Eglfing seen from the north

- Coat of arms

- Location of Eglfing within Weilheim-Schongau district
- Interactive map of Eglfing
- Location within Germany Location within Bavaria
- Coordinates: 47°44′N 11°11′E
- Country: Germany
- State: Bavaria
- Admin. region: Oberbayern
- District: Weilheim-Schongau
- Municipal assoc.: Huglfing

Government
  - Mayor (2020–26): Martin Fortmaier

Area
  - Total: 16.16 km^{2} (6.24 sq mi)
- Elevation: 652 m (2,139 ft)

Population (2025-12-31)
  - Total: 1,199
  - Density: 74.20/km^{2} (192.2/sq mi)
- Time zone: UTC+01:00 (CET)
  - Summer (DST): UTC+02:00 (CEST)
- Postal codes: 82436
- Dialling codes: 08847
- Vehicle registration: WM
- Website: www.eglfing.de

Eglfing is a municipality in the Weilheim-Schongau district, in Bavaria, Germany.
