= Wildsteig =

- Municipality
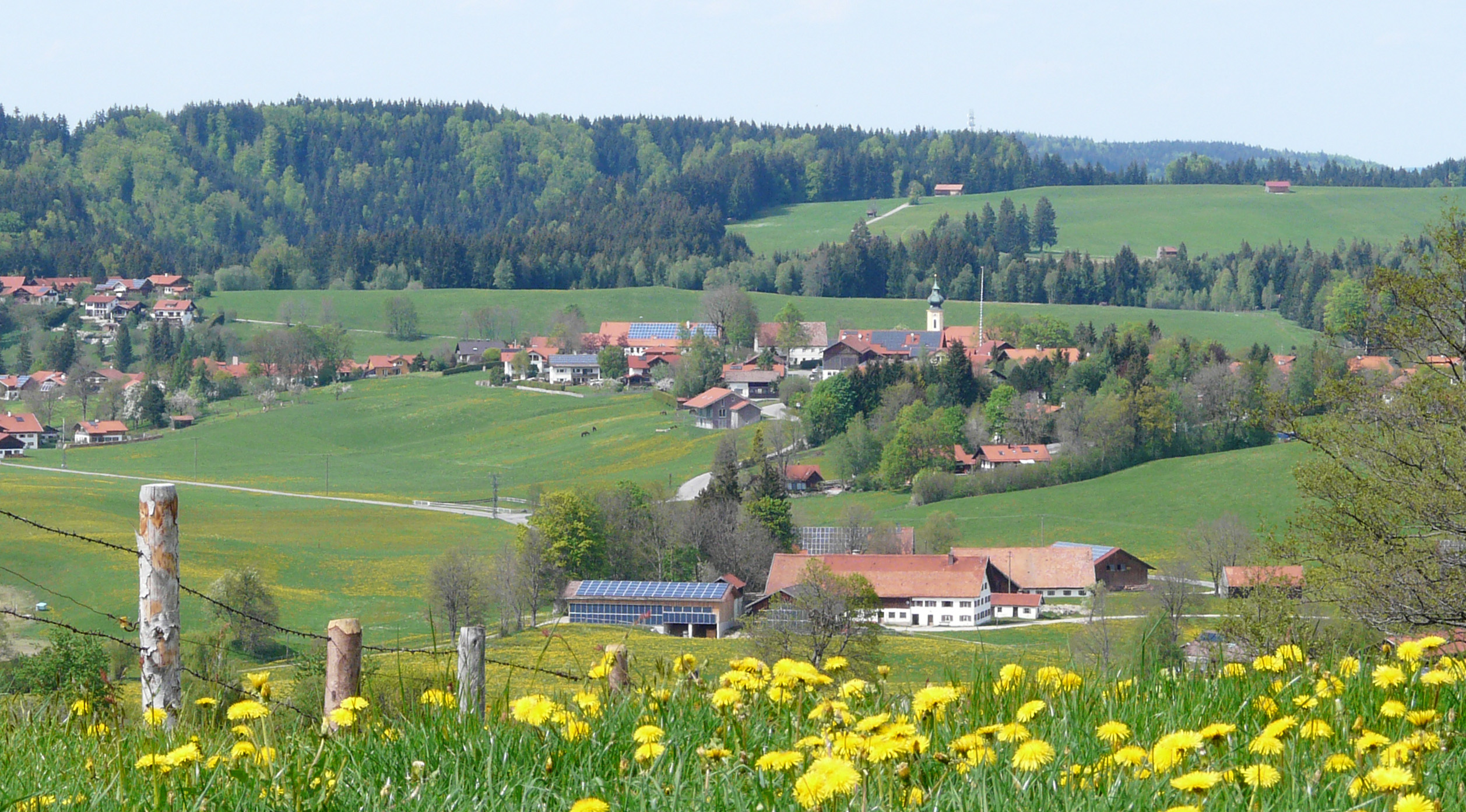
- Wildsteig seen from the south

- Coat of arms

- Location of Wildsteig within Weilheim-Schongau district
- Interactive map of Wildsteig
- Location within Germany Location within Bavaria
- Coordinates: 47°42′N 10°57′E
- Country: Germany
- State: Bavaria
- Admin. region: Oberbayern
- District: Weilheim-Schongau
- Municipal assoc.: Steingaden

Government
  - Mayor (2020–26): Josef Taffertshofer

Area
  - Total: 47.73 km^{2} (18.43 sq mi)
- Elevation: 875 m (2,871 ft)

Population (2025-12-31)
  - Total: 1,362
  - Density: 28.54/km^{2} (73.91/sq mi)
- Time zone: UTC+01:00 (CET)
  - Summer (DST): UTC+02:00 (CEST)
- Postal codes: 82409
- Dialling codes: 08867
- Vehicle registration: WM
- Website: www.wildsteig.de

Wildsteig is a municipality in the Weilheim-Schongau district, in Bavaria, Germany.

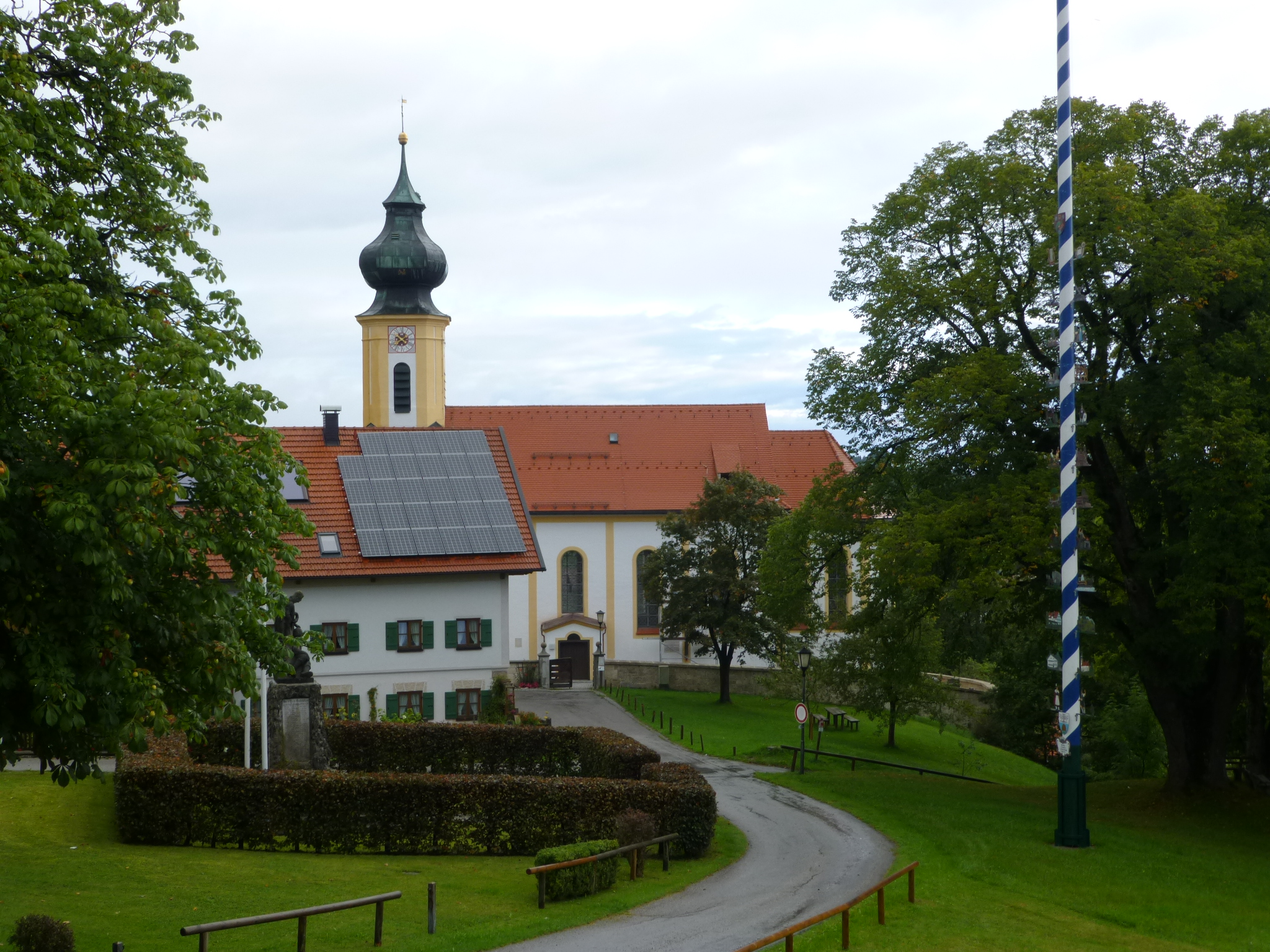
St Jakob church, Maypole, War monument seen from the Kirchbergstrasse
