= Eberfing =

- Municipality
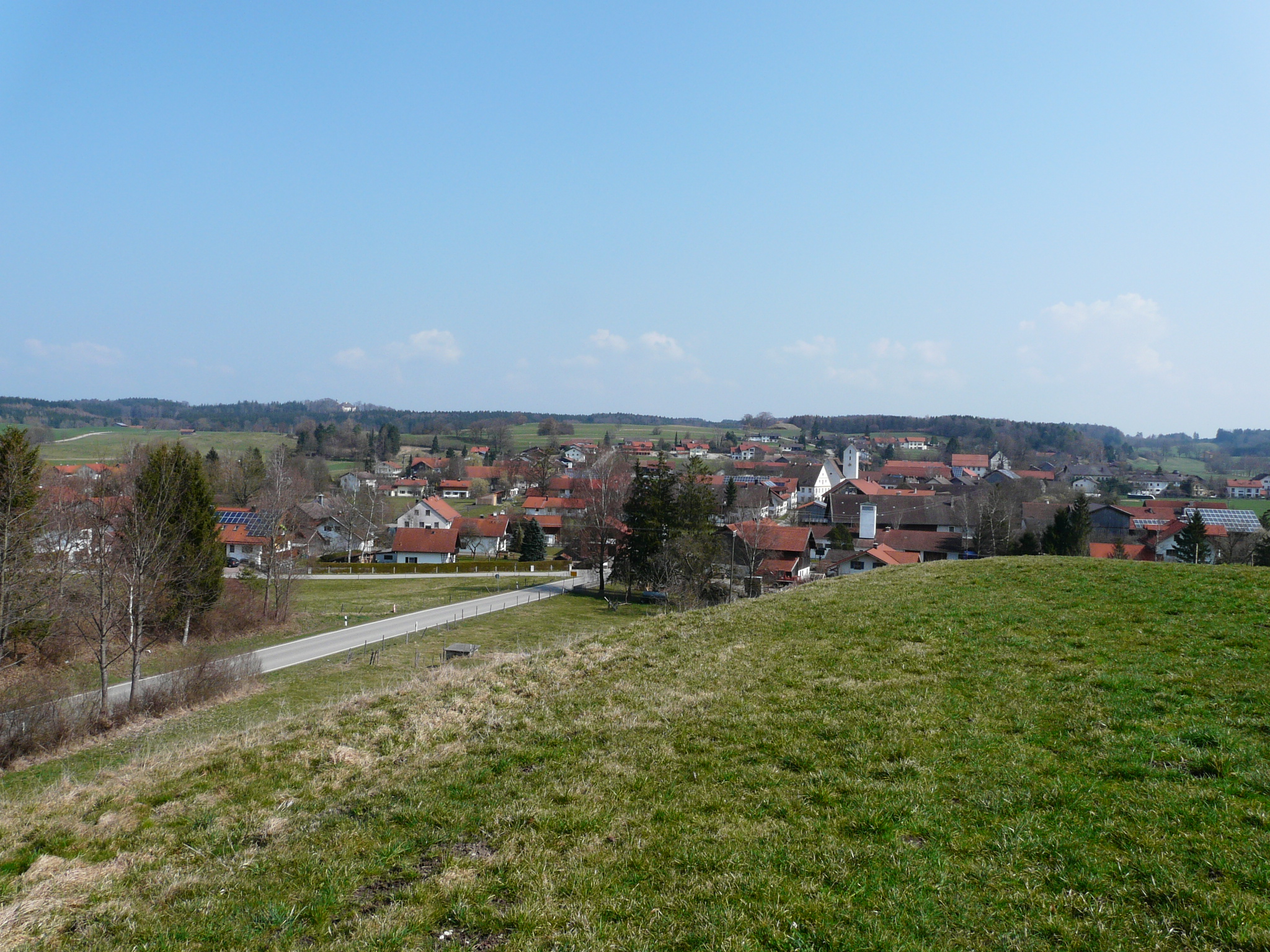
- Eberfing seen from the west

- Coat of arms

- Location of Eberfing within Weilheim-Schongau district
- Interactive map of Eberfing
- Location within Germany Location within Bavaria
- Coordinates: 47°48′N 11°12′E
- Country: Germany
- State: Bavaria
- Admin. region: Oberbayern
- District: Weilheim-Schongau
- Municipal assoc.: Huglfing

Government
  - Mayor (2020–26): Georg Leis jun. (CSU)

Area
  - Total: 25.93 km^{2} (10.01 sq mi)
- Elevation: 610 m (2,000 ft)

Population (2025-12-31)
  - Total: 1,522
  - Density: 58.70/km^{2} (152.0/sq mi)
- Time zone: UTC+01:00 (CET)
  - Summer (DST): UTC+02:00 (CEST)
- Postal codes: 82390
- Dialling codes: 08802
- Vehicle registration: WM
- Website: www.eberfing.de

Eberfing (German pronunciation: [ˈeːbɐfɪŋ]) is a municipality in the Weilheim-Schongau district, in Bavaria, Germany.
