= Prem, Bavaria =

Prem
- Municipality
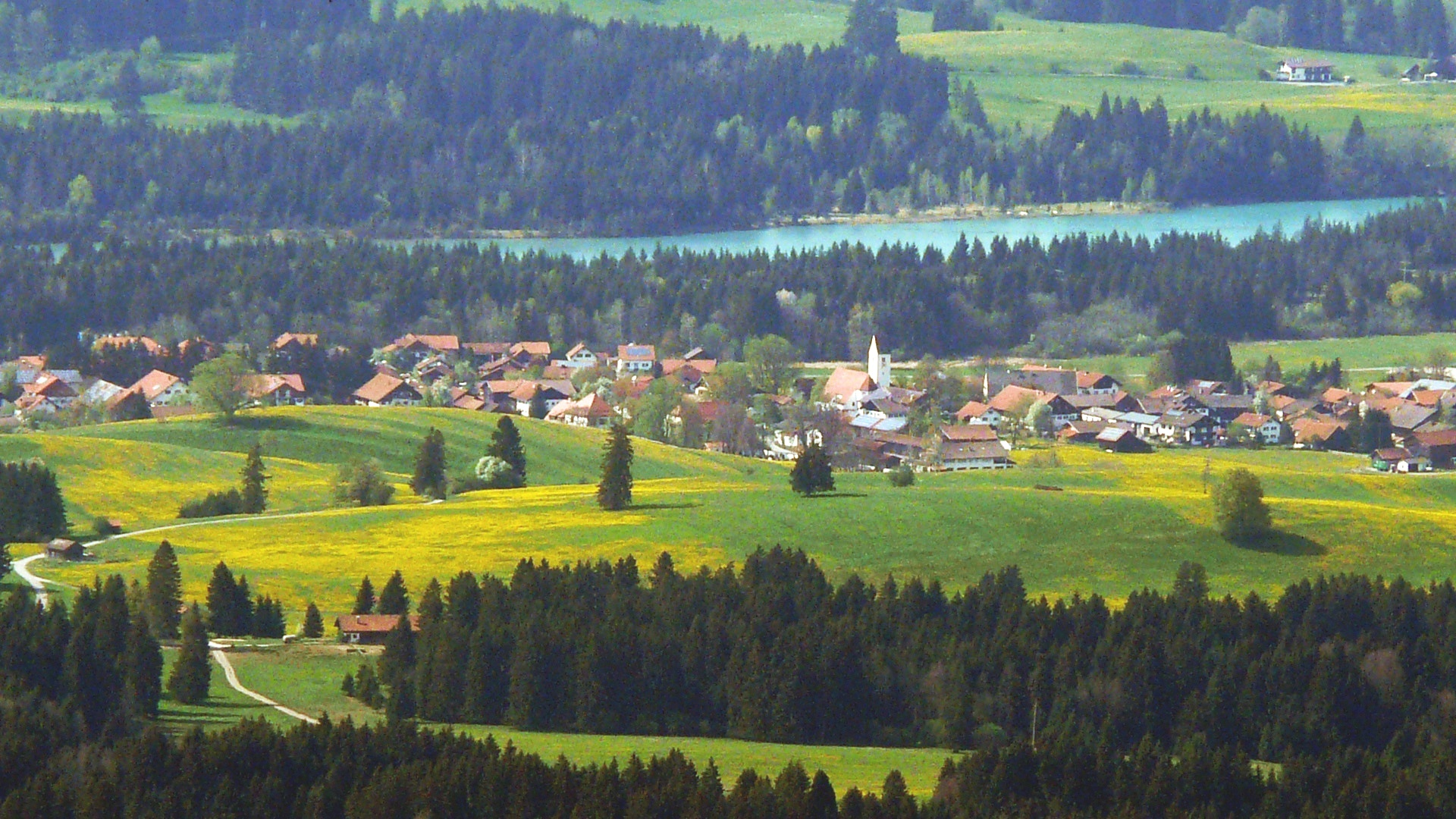
- Prem

- Coat of arms

- Location of Prem within Weilheim-Schongau district
- Interactive map of Prem
- Location within Germany Location within Bavaria
- Coordinates: 47°41′N 10°48′E
- Country: Germany
- State: Bavaria
- Admin. region: Oberbayern
- District: Weilheim-Schongau
- Municipal assoc.: Steingaden

Government
  - Mayor (2020–26): Andreas Echtler (CSU)

Area
  - Total: 15.91 km^{2} (6.14 sq mi)
- Elevation: 733–859 m (2,405–2,818 ft)

Population (2025-12-31)
  - Total: 946
  - Density: 59.5/km^{2} (154/sq mi)
- Time zone: UTC+01:00 (CET)
  - Summer (DST): UTC+02:00 (CEST)
- Postal codes: 86984
- Dialling codes: 08862
- Vehicle registration: WM
- Website: www.prem-am-lech.de

Prem is a municipality in the Weilheim-Schongau district, in Bavaria, Germany.

== Demographics ==
Population development:

- 1871: 380 inhabitants
- 1925: 536 inhabitants
- 1950: 810 inhabitants
- 1970: 766 inhabitants
- 2011: 858 inhabitants
- 2022: 953 inhabitants
