= Rottenbuch =

- Municipality
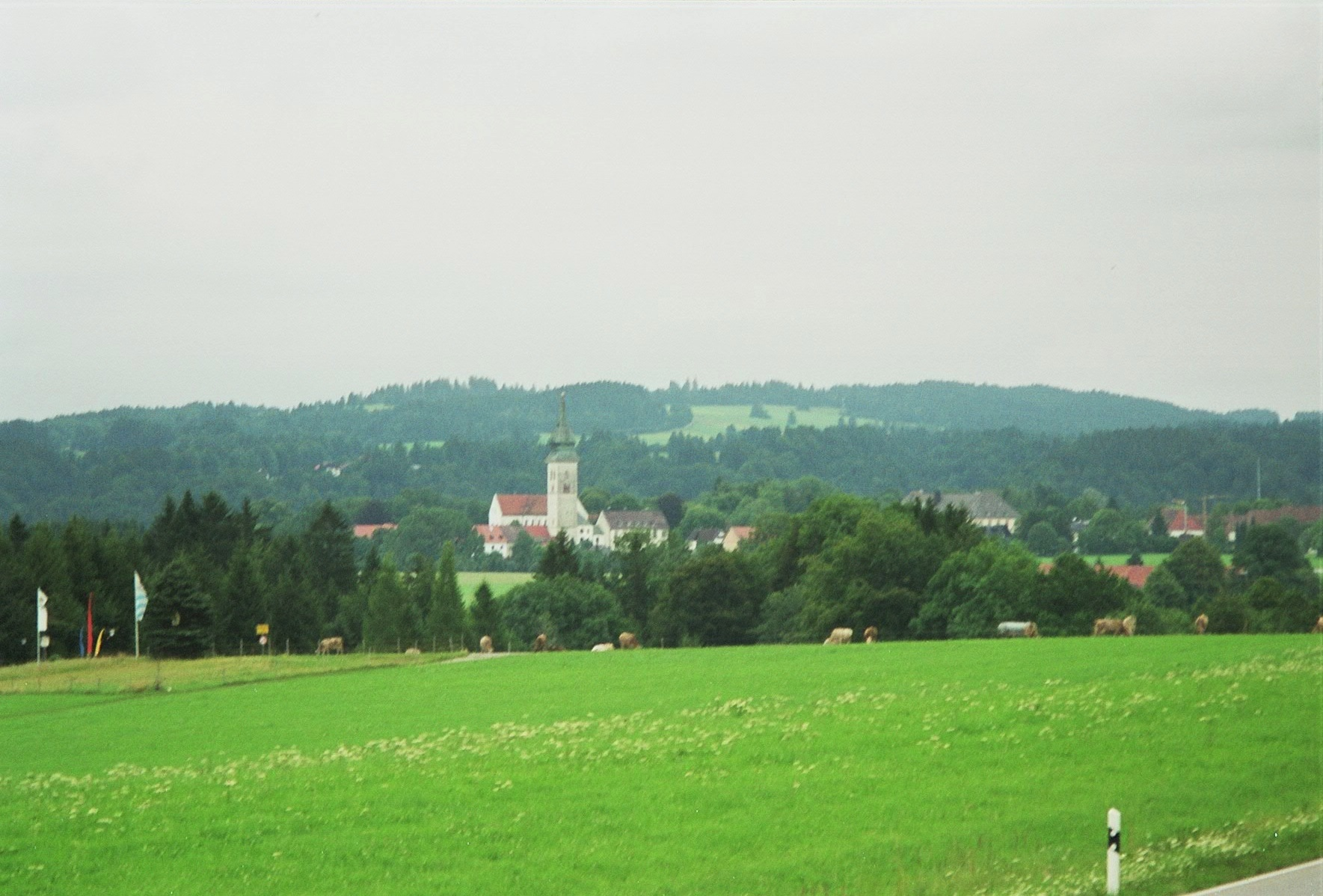
- Rottenbuch seen from the west

- Coat of arms

- Location of Rottenbuch within Weilheim-Schongau district
- Interactive map of Rottenbuch
- Location within Germany Location within Bavaria
- Coordinates: 47°44′05″N 10°58′00″E
- Country: Germany
- State: Bavaria
- Admin. region: Upper Bavaria
- District: Weilheim-Schongau
- Municipal assoc.: Rottenbuch

Government
  - Mayor (2020–26): Markus Bader

Area
  - Total: 31.48 km^{2} (12.15 sq mi)
- Elevation: 763 m (2,503 ft)

Population (2025-12-31)
  - Total: 1,847
  - Density: 58.67/km^{2} (152.0/sq mi)
- Time zone: UTC+01:00 (CET)
  - Summer (DST): UTC+02:00 (CEST)
- Postal codes: 82401
- Dialling codes: 08867
- Vehicle registration: WM
- Website: www.rottenbuch.de

Rottenbuch (German pronunciation: [ˈʁɔtn̩buːx]) is a municipality in the Weilheim-Schongau district, in Bavaria, Germany. It is the site of Rottenbuch Abbey church. Its name stems from a beech tree clearing; it is common in Germany to find place names based on tree clearings. The first historical mention appears in 1073 when Welf I gifts the by then already built Augustinian monastery large lands on both sides of the Ammer river. Supposedly, since around 950, some "Einsiedler" (hermits/ascetics) were already living in Rottenbuch together and following a monastic way of life.

The Romanesque style Rottenbuch Abbey church was constructed between 1085 and 1125. The free-standing tower accompanied by a "crossing transept" is something unusual for a Bavarian church. It was one of the centres of papal loyalty during the Investiture Controversy. Emperor Luois the Bavarian in the 14 century was patron of the abbey, and this as well as its being on the pilgrimage route to Italy, made Rottenbuch become the most influential house of Canons Regular (community of priests) in Germany.

The medieval interior of the church was redecorated in the 18th century to the very ornate High Baroque style by the painter Matthäus Günther and stuccoist Josef Schmuzer.

In 1803, under the Reichsdeputationshauptschluss 1803 (which "secularized nearly 70 ecclesiastical states and abolished 45 imperial cities"), the monastic buildings were pulled down and the noteworthy contents of the library were sent to a paper mill. What was the abbey church became a parish church, which is what remains to the present day.

The village was part of the electorate of Bavaria and formed a closed "Hofmark" (a type of partnership) together with Böbing, Wildsteig, and Schönberg. Through the Reichsdeputationshauptschluss 1803, this Hofmark arrangement was repealed, and the Rottenbuch monastery was dissolved. Nearly all men of the choir had to abandon their posts, and possibly also Rottenbuch entirely.

Out of the remains of the Hofmark Rottenbuch formed, through the passing of administrative reforms in the Kingdom of Bavaria with an edict of 1818, the political municipalities of Rottenbuch, Böbing, Wildsteig, and Schönberg. All of these are under the district court of Schöngau.
