= Eyach (Ammer) =

River of Bavaria, Germany

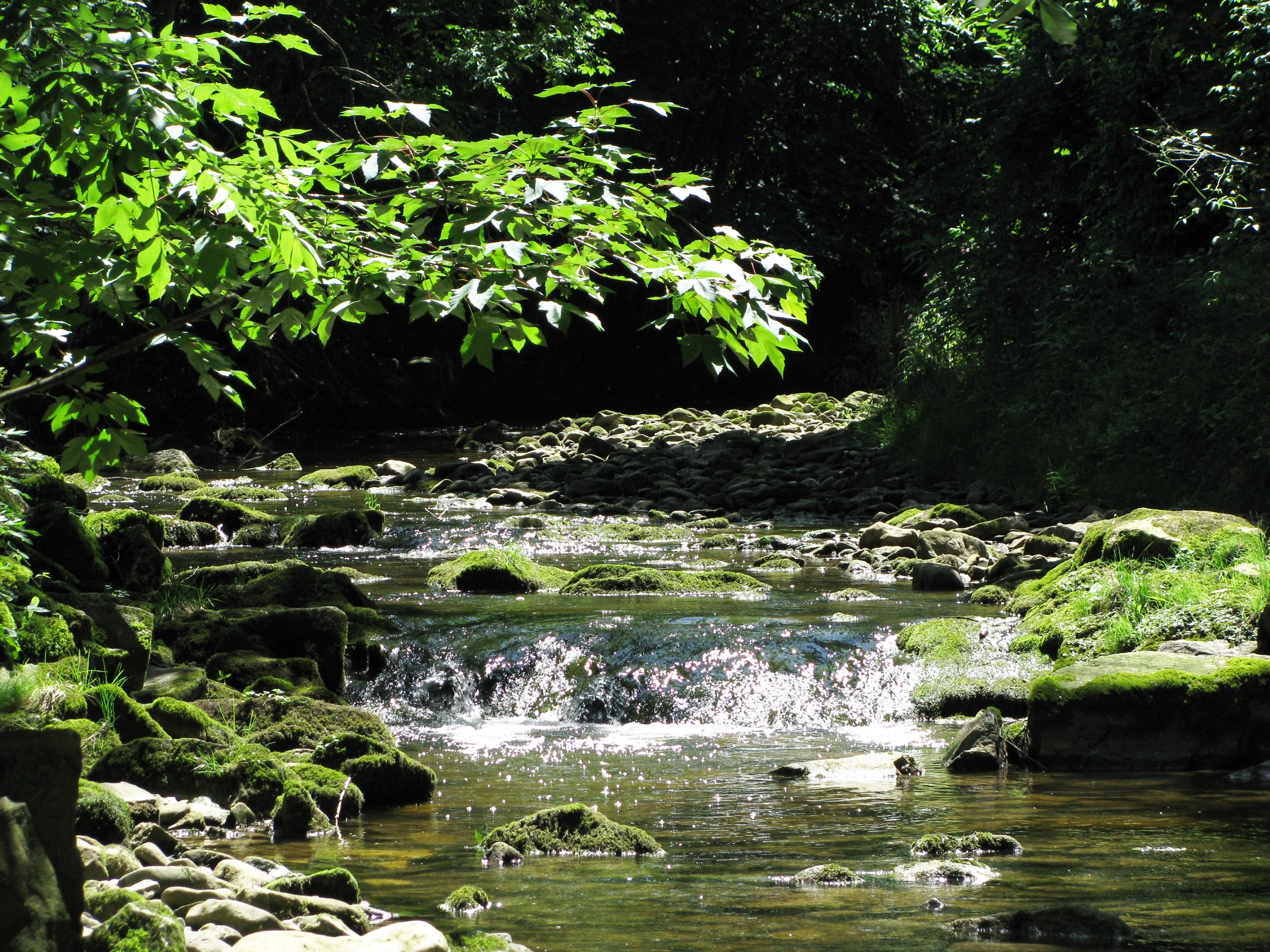
- The Eyach at the village Eyach, a part of Oberhausen

Location
- Country: Germany
- State: Bavaria

Physical characteristics
- Mouth
  - location: Ammer
  - coordinates: 47.7838°N 11.1076°E
- Length: 18.7 km (11.6 mi)

Basin features
- Progression: Amper→ Isar→ Danube→ Black Sea

Eyach is a river of Bavaria, Germany. It is a right tributary of the Ammer east of Peißenberg.

== See also ==
- List of rivers of Bavaria
