= Huglfing station =

Railway station in Bavaria

Huglfing
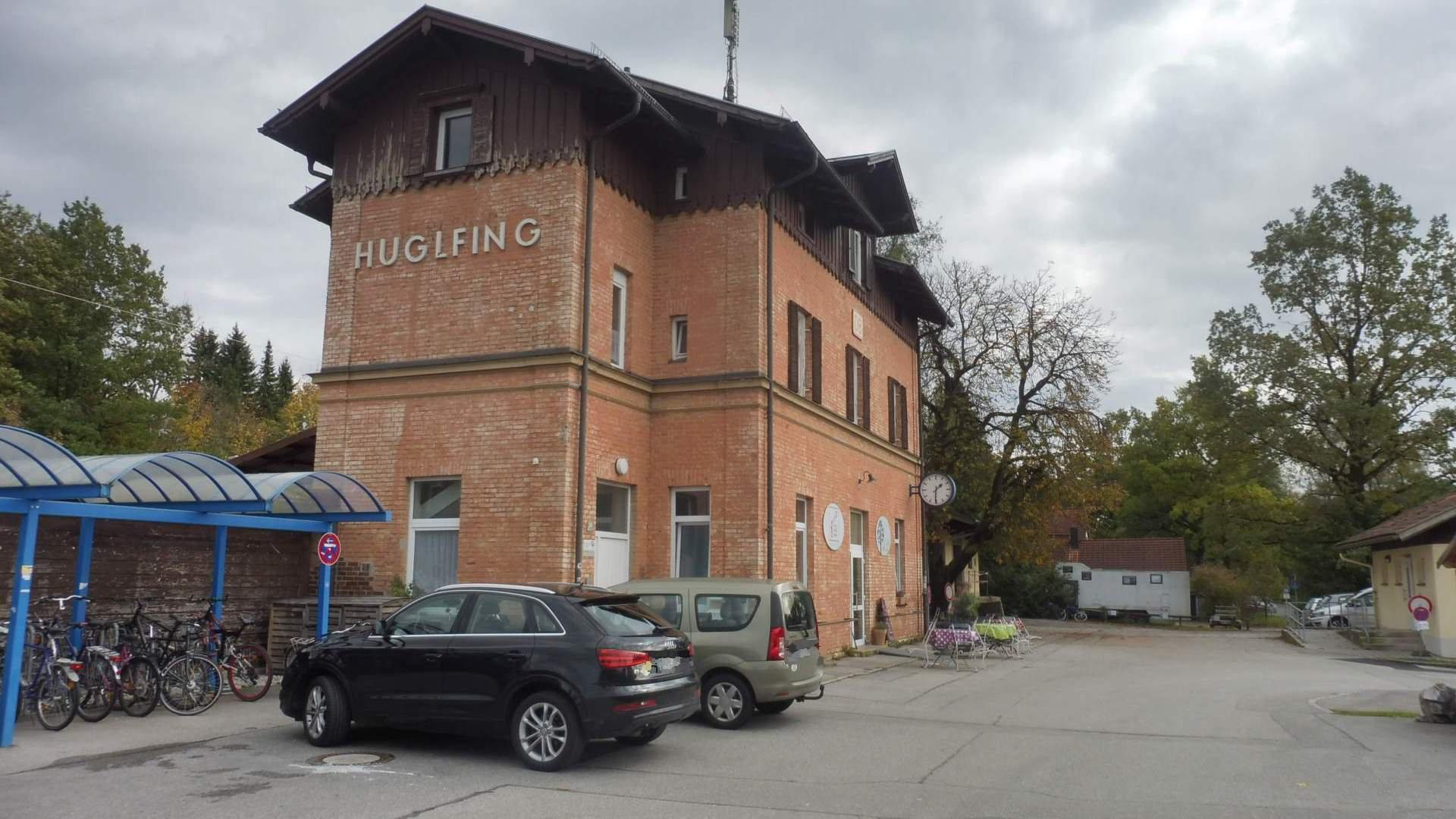
- The station building in 2011

General information
- Location: Huglfing, Bavaria; Germany
- Coordinates: 47°46′36″N 11°08′25″E
- Owner: DB Netz
- Operator: DB Station&Service
- Lines: Munich–Garmisch-Partenkirchen line (KBS 960)
- Distance: 62.0 km (38.5 mi) from München Hauptbahnhof
- Platforms: 2 side platforms
- Tracks: 2
- Train operators: DB Regio Bayern
- Connections: Regionalverkehr Oberbayern buses

Other information
- Station code: 2941
- DS100 code: MHUG
- IBNR: 8003024
- Category: 6

Services
Preceding station	DB Regio Bayern	Following station
Uffing am Staffelsee towards Innsbruck Hbf	RB 6	Weilheim (Oberbay) towards München Hbf
Uffing am Staffelsee towards Pfronten-Steinach	RB 60	Weilheim (Oberbay) towards München Hbf
Location

Huglfing station (German: Bahnhof Huglfing) is a railway station in the municipality of Huglfing, in Bavaria, Germany. It is located on the Munich–Garmisch-Partenkirchen railway of Deutsche Bahn.

== Services ==
As of the December 2021 timetable change, the following services stop at Huglfing:

- RB: hourly service between München Hauptbahnhof and Garmisch-Partenkirchen; some trains continue from Garmisch-Partenkirchen to Pfronten-Steinach, Mittenwald, Seefeld in Tirol, or Innsbruck.
