= Ingenried =

- Municipality
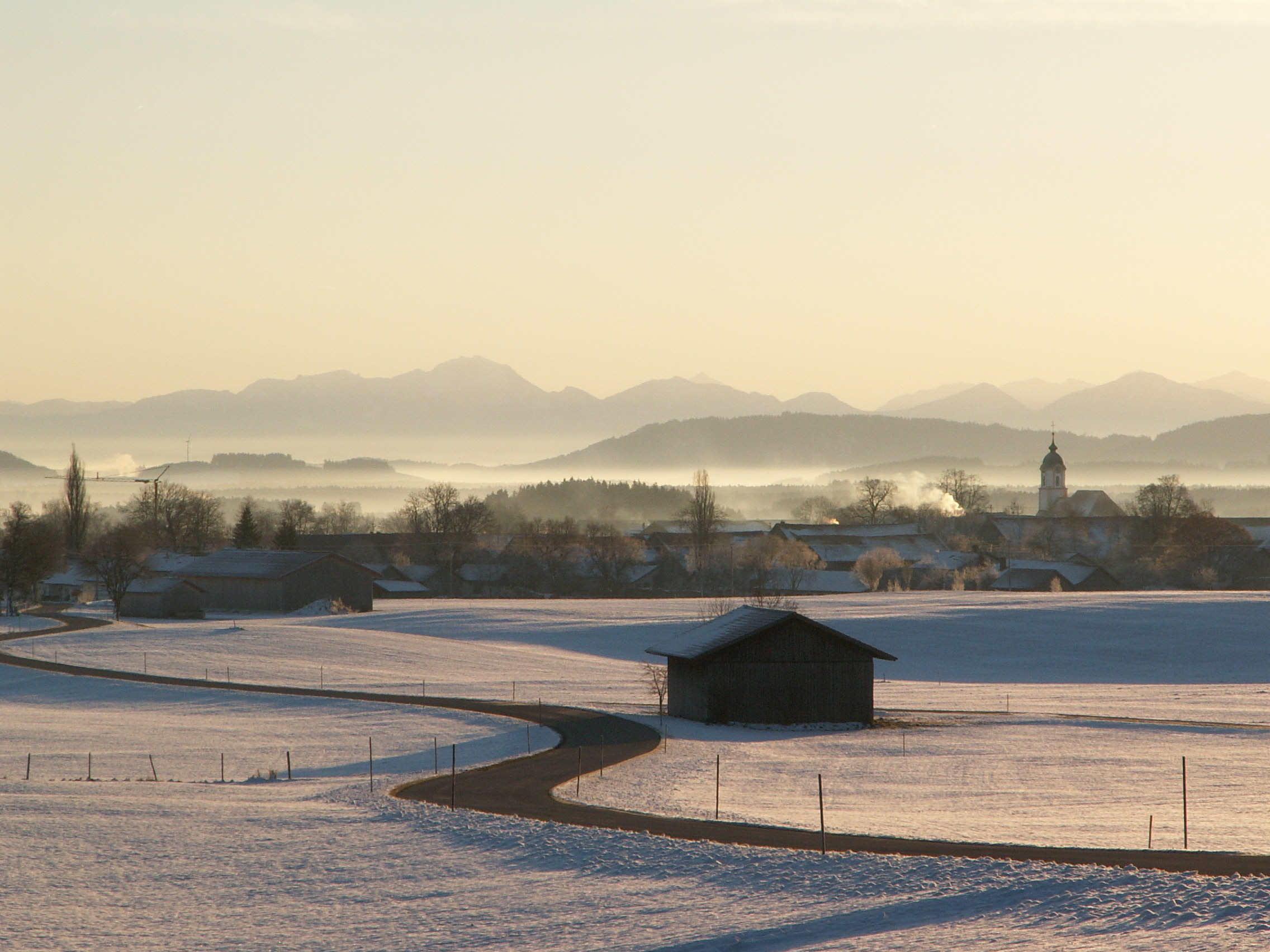
- Ingenried on a winter morning

- Coat of arms

- Location of Ingenried within Weilheim-Schongau district
- Interactive map of Ingenried
- Location within Germany Location within Bavaria
- Coordinates: 47°49′N 10°47′E
- Country: Germany
- State: Bavaria
- Admin. region: Oberbayern
- District: Weilheim-Schongau
- Municipal assoc.: Altenstadt

Government
  - Mayor (2020–26): Georg Saur

Area
  - Total: 17.45 km^{2} (6.74 sq mi)
- Elevation: 664 m (2,178 ft)

Population (2025-12-31)
  - Total: 1,116
  - Density: 63.95/km^{2} (165.6/sq mi)
- Time zone: UTC+01:00 (CET)
  - Summer (DST): UTC+02:00 (CEST)
- Postal codes: 86980
- Dialling codes: 08868
- Vehicle registration: WM
- Website: www.ingenried.de

Ingenried is a municipality in the Weilheim-Schongau district, in Bavaria, Germany.

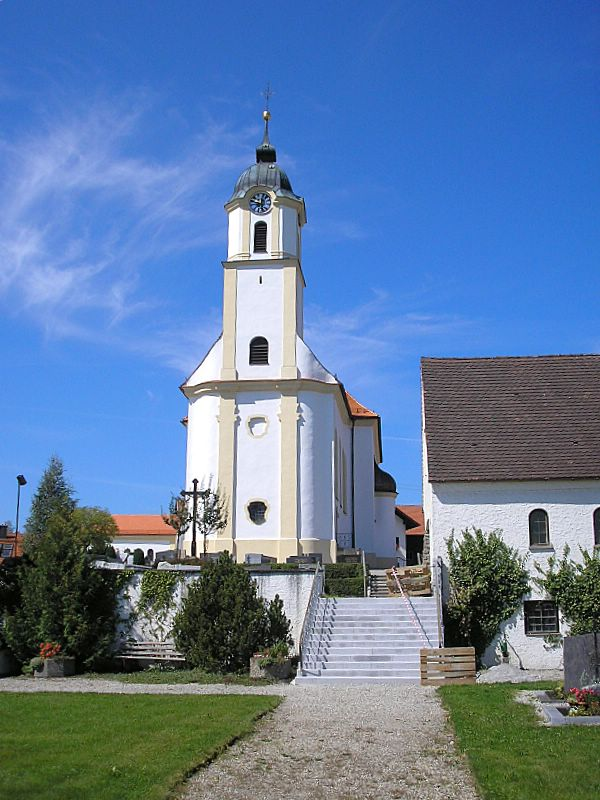
Saint George's church, Ingenried
