= Wielenbach =

- Municipality
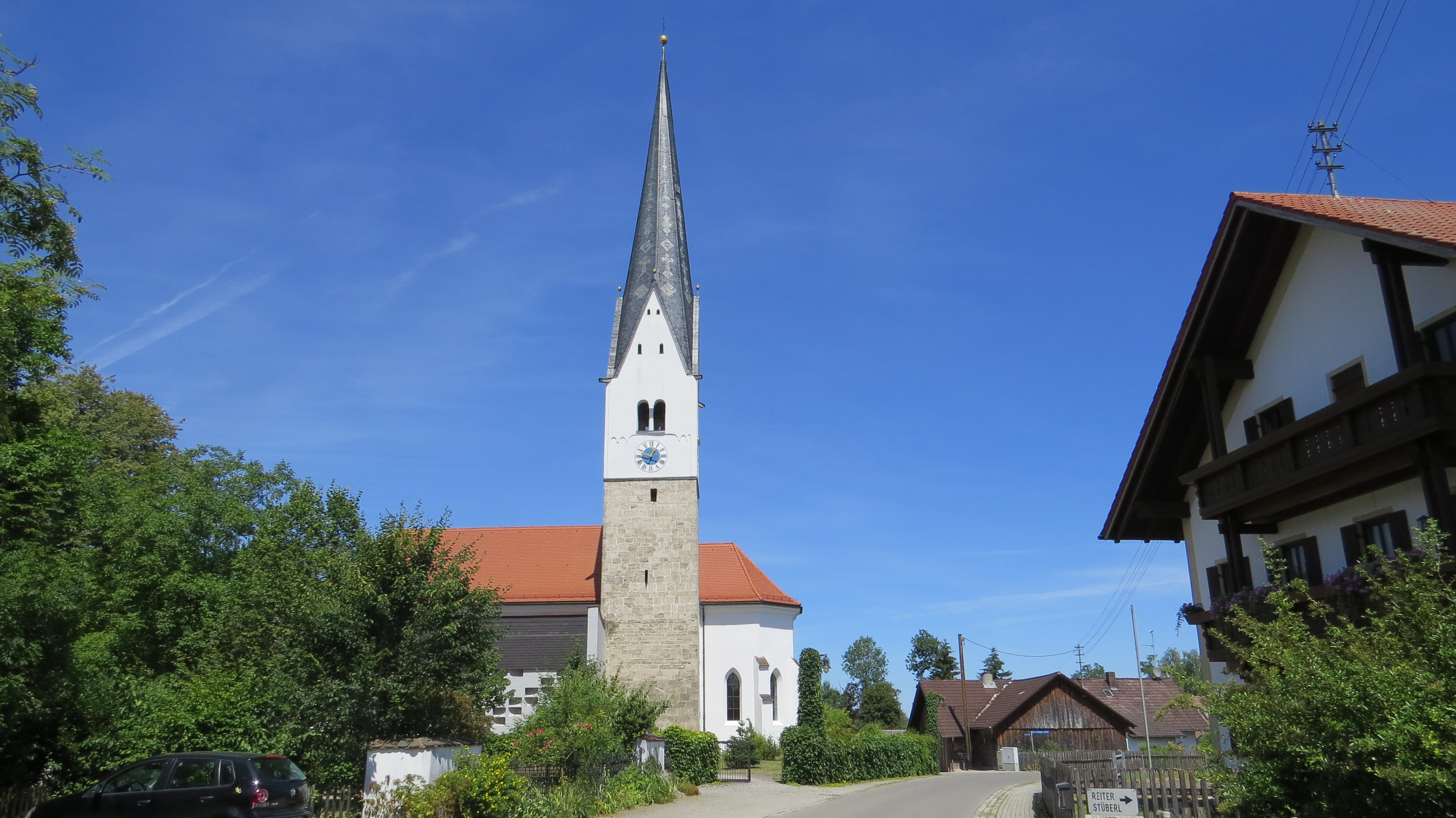
- Parish Church of Saint Peter

- Coat of arms

- Location of Wielenbach within Weilheim-Schongau district
- Interactive map of Wielenbach
- Location within Germany Location within Bavaria
- Coordinates: 47°52′N 11°9′E
- Country: Germany
- State: Bavaria
- Admin. region: Upper Bavaria
- District: Weilheim-Schongau

Government
  - Mayor (2020–26): Harald Mansi

Area
  - Total: 33.02 km^{2} (12.75 sq mi)
- Elevation: 540–650 m (1,770–2,130 ft)

Population (2025-12-31)
  - Total: 3,436
  - Density: 104.1/km^{2} (269.5/sq mi)
- Time zone: UTC+01:00 (CET)
  - Summer (DST): UTC+02:00 (CEST)
- Postal codes: 82407
- Dialling codes: 0881
- Vehicle registration: WM
- Website: www.wielenbach.de

Wielenbach (German pronunciation: [ˈviːlənbax]) is a municipality in the Weilheim-Schongau district, in Bavaria, Germany.
