= Huglfing =

- Municipality
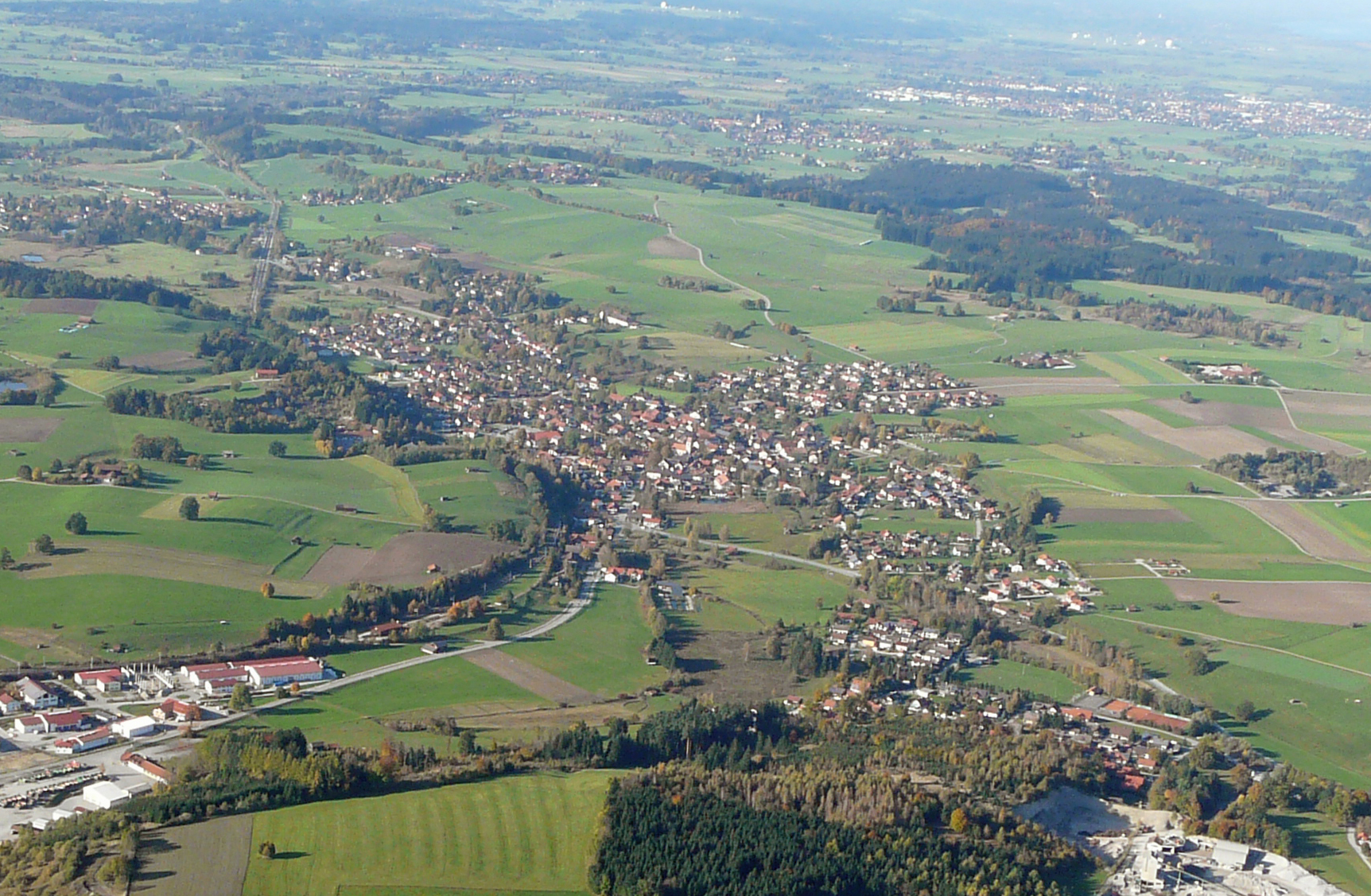
- Huglfing from the south

- Coat of arms

- Location of Huglfing within Weilheim-Schongau district
- Interactive map of Huglfing
- Location within Germany Location within Bavaria
- Coordinates: 47°46′N 11°10′E
- Country: Germany
- State: Bavaria
- Admin. region: Upper Bavaria
- District: Weilheim-Schongau
- Municipal assoc.: Huglfing

Government
  - Mayor (2020–26): Markus Huber

Area
  - Total: 24.36 km^{2} (9.41 sq mi)
- Elevation: 606 m (1,988 ft)

Population (2025-12-31)
  - Total: 2,869
  - Density: 117.8/km^{2} (305.0/sq mi)
- Time zone: UTC+01:00 (CET)
  - Summer (DST): UTC+02:00 (CEST)
- Postal codes: 82386
- Dialling codes: 08802
- Vehicle registration: WM
- Website: www.huglfing.de

Huglfing is a municipality in the Weilheim-Schongau district, in Bavaria, Germany.

== Transport ==
The district has a railway station, Huglfing, on the Munich–Garmisch-Partenkirchen railway.
