= Rottenbuch (Verwaltungsgemeinschaft) =

- Verwaltungsgemeinschaft
- Location of Rottenbuch within Weilheim-Schongau district
- Interactive map of Rottenbuch
- Location within Germany Location within Bavaria
- Coordinates: 47°44′N 10°58′E
- Country: Germany
- State: Bavaria
- Admin. region: Upper Bavaria
- District: Weilheim-Schongau
- Seat: Rottenbuch
- Subdivisions: 2 municipalities

Area
  - Total: 71.79 km^{2} (27.72 sq mi)

Population (2025-12-31)
  - Total: 3,758
  - Density: 52.35/km^{2} (135.6/sq mi)
- Time zone: UTC+01:00 (CET)
  - Summer (DST): UTC+02:00 (CEST)
- Website: rottenbuch-boebing.de

Rottenbuch is a Verwaltungsgemeinschaft (municipal association) in the district Weilheim-Schongau in Bavaria, Germany. Its seat is in Rottenbuch.

It consists of the following municipalities:

1. Böbing
2. Rottenbuch
