= Böbing =

- Municipality
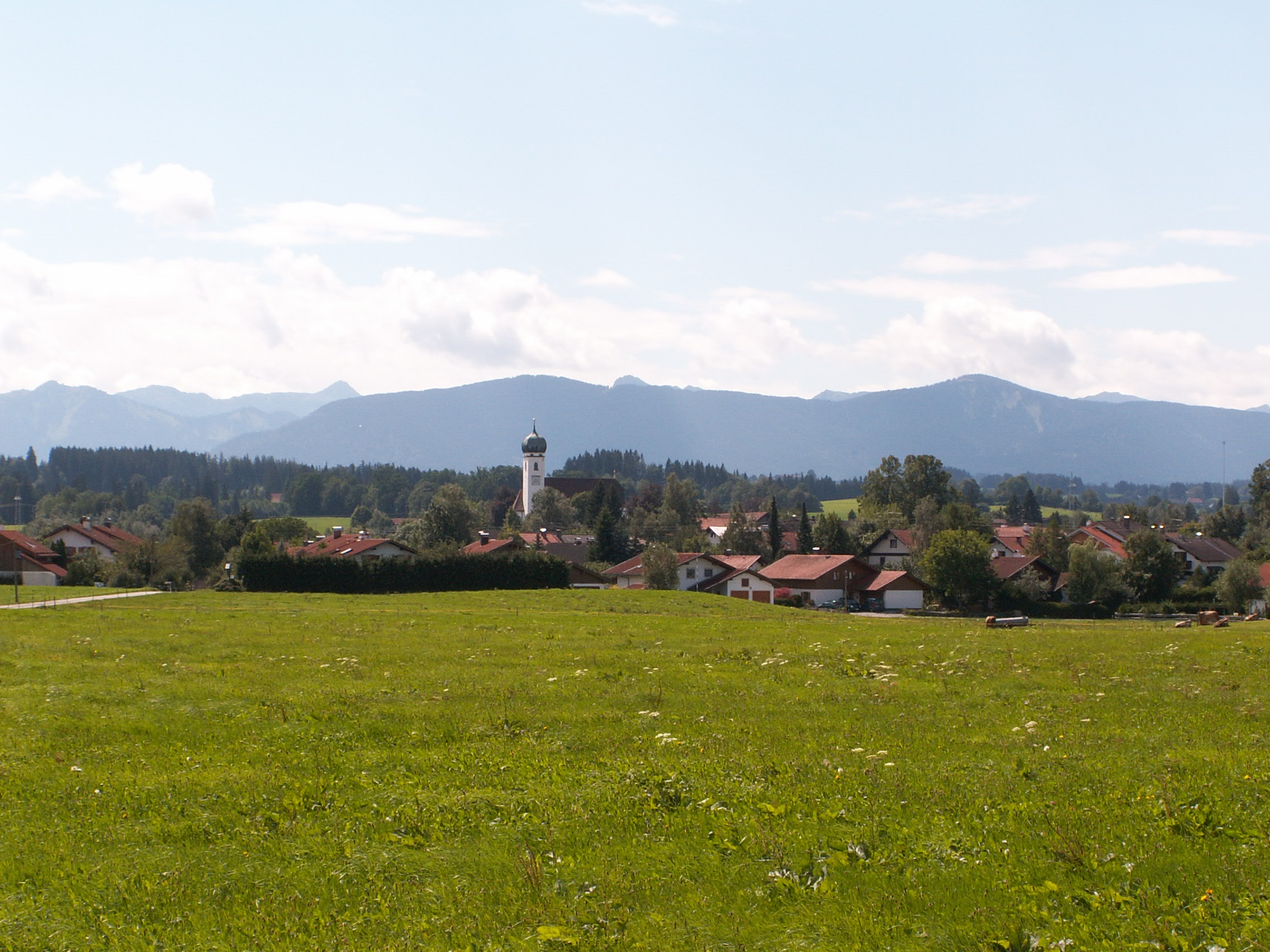
- Böbing seen from the north

- Coat of arms

- Location of Böbing within Weilheim-Schongau district
- Interactive map of Böbing
- Location within Germany Location within Bavaria
- Coordinates: 47°45′N 10°59′E
- Country: Germany
- State: Bavaria
- Admin. region: Oberbayern
- District: Weilheim-Schongau
- Municipal assoc.: Rottenbuch

Government
  - Mayor (2020–26): Peter Erhard (CSU)

Area
  - Total: 40.31 km^{2} (15.56 sq mi)
- Elevation: 610–936 m (2,001–3,071 ft)

Population (2025-12-31)
  - Total: 1,911
  - Density: 47.41/km^{2} (122.8/sq mi)
- Time zone: UTC+01:00 (CET)
  - Summer (DST): UTC+02:00 (CEST)
- Postal codes: 82389
- Dialling codes: 08867
- Vehicle registration: WM
- Website: www.boebing.de

Böbing (German pronunciation: [ˈbøːbɪŋ]) is a municipality in the Weilheim-Schongau district, in Bavaria, Germany.
