= Schwabbruck =

- Municipality
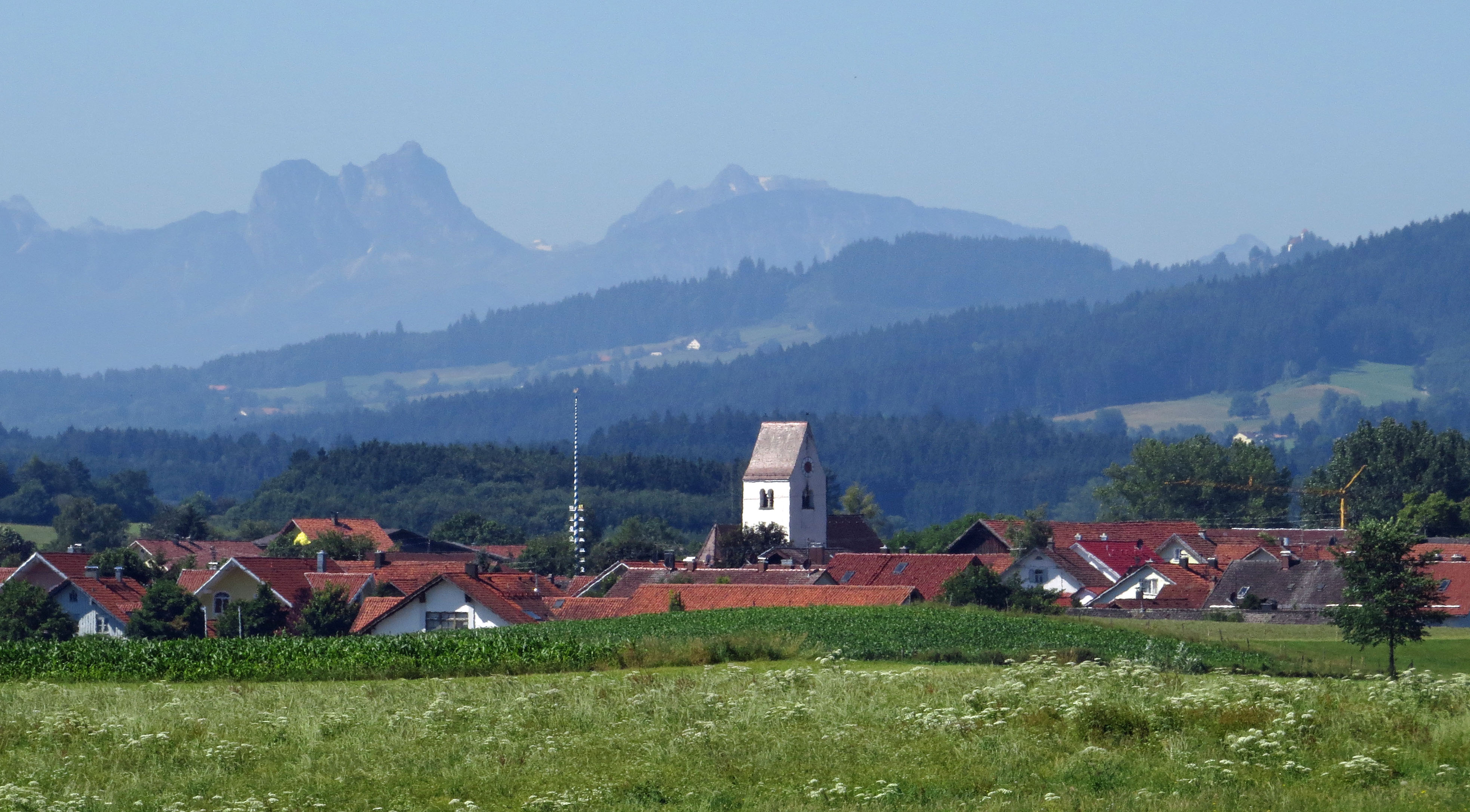
- Schwabbruck seen from the northeast

- Coat of arms

- Location of Schwabbruck within Weilheim-Schongau district
- Interactive map of Schwabbruck
- Location within Germany Location within Bavaria
- Coordinates: 47°49′34″N 10°50′10″E
- Country: Germany
- State: Bavaria
- Admin. region: Oberbayern
- District: Weilheim-Schongau
- Municipal assoc.: Altenstadt

Government
  - Mayor (2020–26): Norbert Essich

Area
  - Total: 7.34 km^{2} (2.83 sq mi)
- Elevation: 733 m (2,405 ft)

Population (2025-12-31)
  - Total: 1,012
  - Density: 138/km^{2} (357/sq mi)
- Time zone: UTC+01:00 (CET)
  - Summer (DST): UTC+02:00 (CEST)
- Postal codes: 86986
- Dialling codes: 08868
- Vehicle registration: WM
- Website: www.schwabbruck.de

Schwabbruck is a municipality in the Weilheim-Schongau district, in Bavaria, Germany.
