= Knockaloe Internment Camp =

British internment camp on the Isle of Man during World War 1

Coordinates: 54.20535°N 4.70456°W

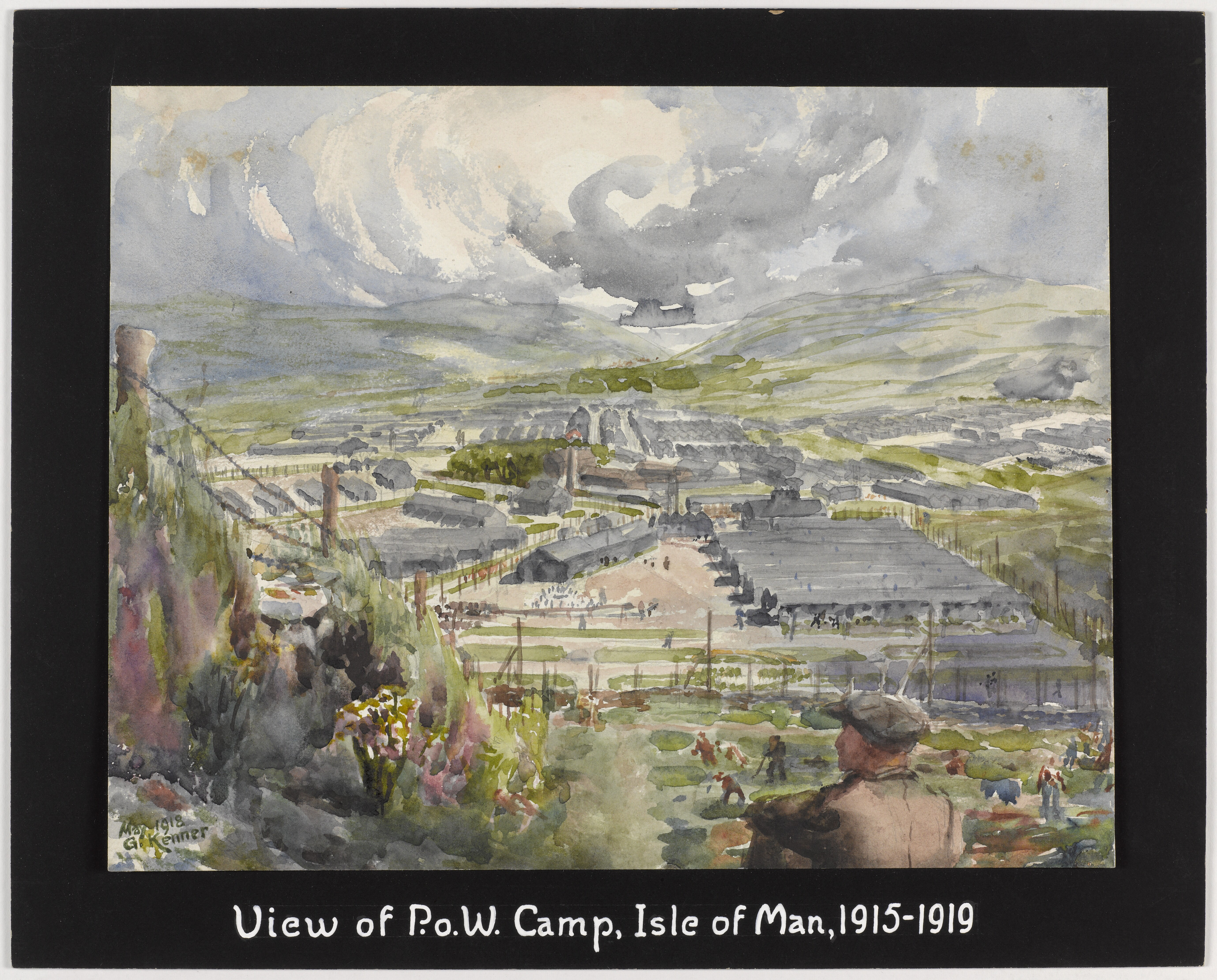
Knockaloe Internment Camp.Painting by George Kenner.

Knockaloe Internment Camp was a WWI internment camp on the Isle of Man, at Knockaloe Farm in the parish of Patrick, near Peel, which housed 23,000 prisoners-of-war and 3,000 guards between 1914 and 1919. It was served by the Knockaloe railway station and branch line.

Knockaloe Farm in Patrick, Isle of Man had been used for military training, and in November 1914 was opened as a purpose-built internment camp.

== Notable people ==
- George Kenner
- Joseph Pilates
- John Quayle-Dickson, sub-commandant
