= Rottenbuch Abbey =

Convent in Rottenbuch, Germany

Coordinates: 47°44′09″N 10°57′58″E

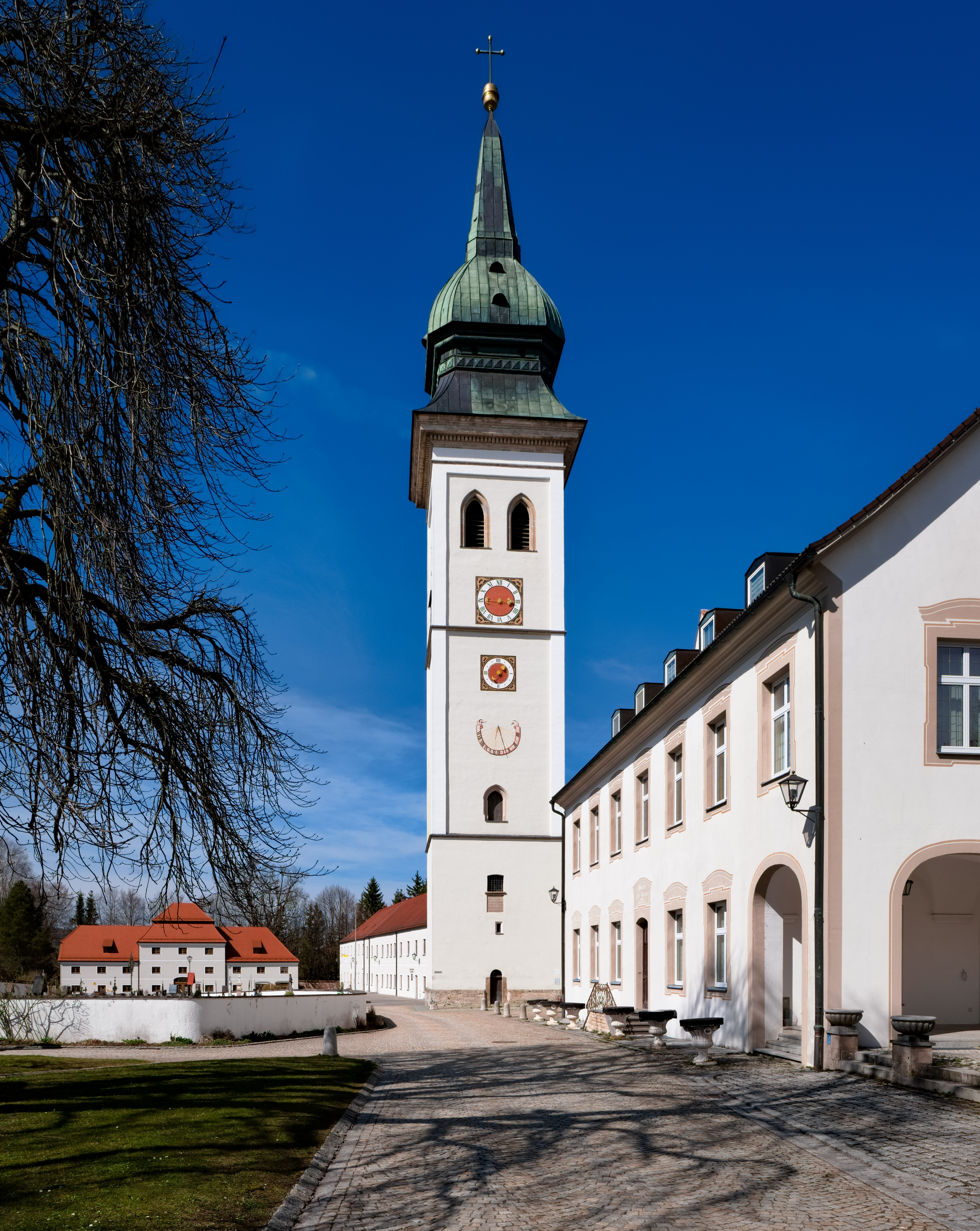
Rottenbuch - The tower of the Abbey church (Abetikirche/Klosterkirche)

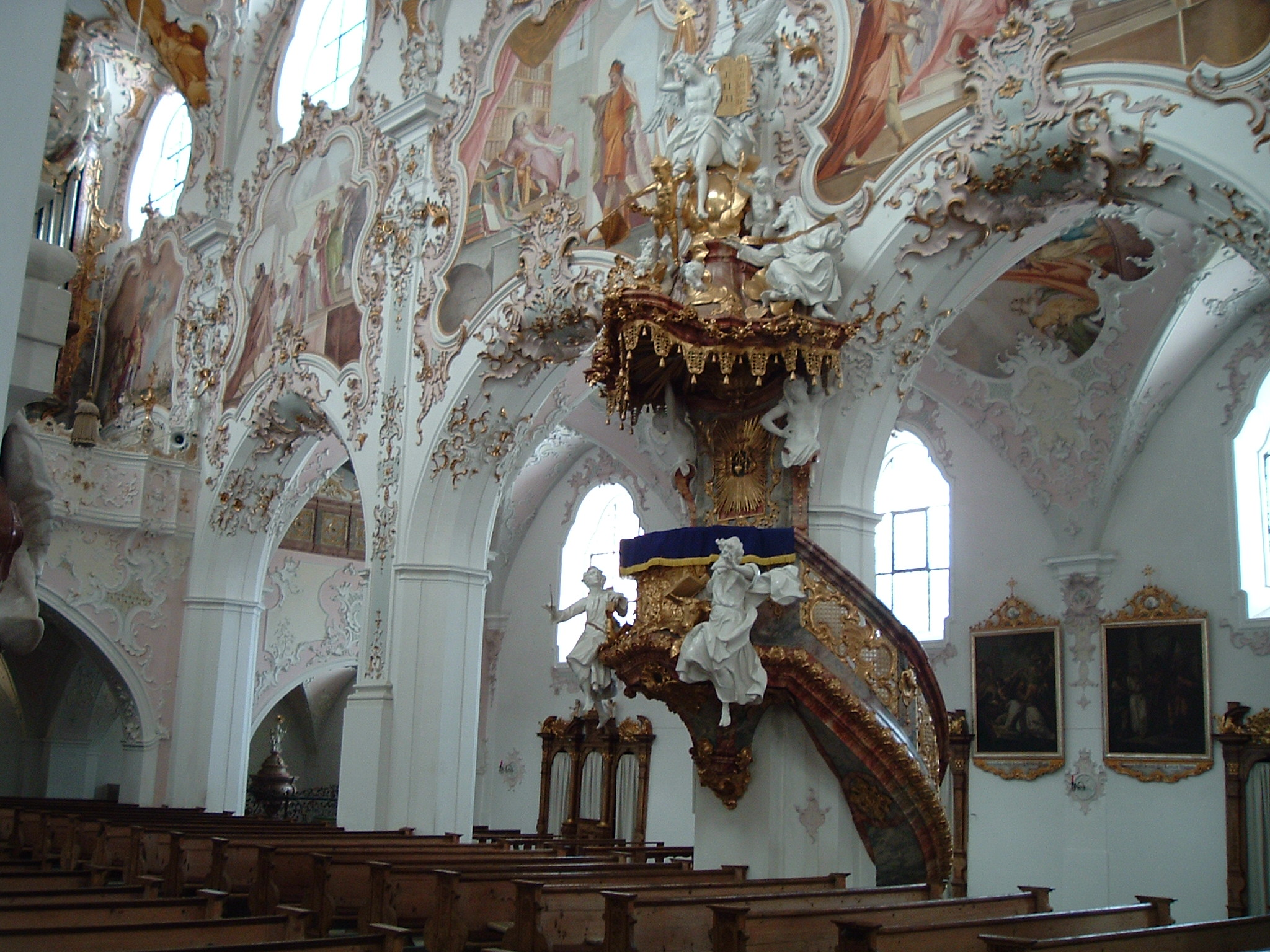
Interior wall of the church (note the pointed arches covered with rococo stucco to hide the point)

Rottenbuch Abbey (German: Kloster Rottenbuch) in Rottenbuch was founded as an Augustinian monastery in 1073 on land granted by Duke Welf I of Bavaria and his wife Judith of Flanders. The Abbey church was constructed between 1085 and 1125 in the Romanesque style. The design of a crossing transept and free-standing tower is unusual for a Bavarian church. Rottenbuch was a center of papal loyalty during the Investiture Controversy. Under the patronage of Emperor Louis the Bavarian in the 14th century, together with its location on the pilgrimage route to Italy, Rottenbuch became the most influential house of Canons Regular in Germany.

In the 18th century the medieval interior of the church was redecorated in the ornate High Baroque style by painter Matthäus Günther and stuccoist Josef Schmuzer. With the secularization of the Bavarian monasteries under Montgelas in 1803 the monastic buildings were pulled down and the noteworthy library sent to a paper mill; the Abbey church became a parish church, which it remains to this day.
