= Oberhausen, Weilheim-Schongau =

Oberhausen
- Municipality
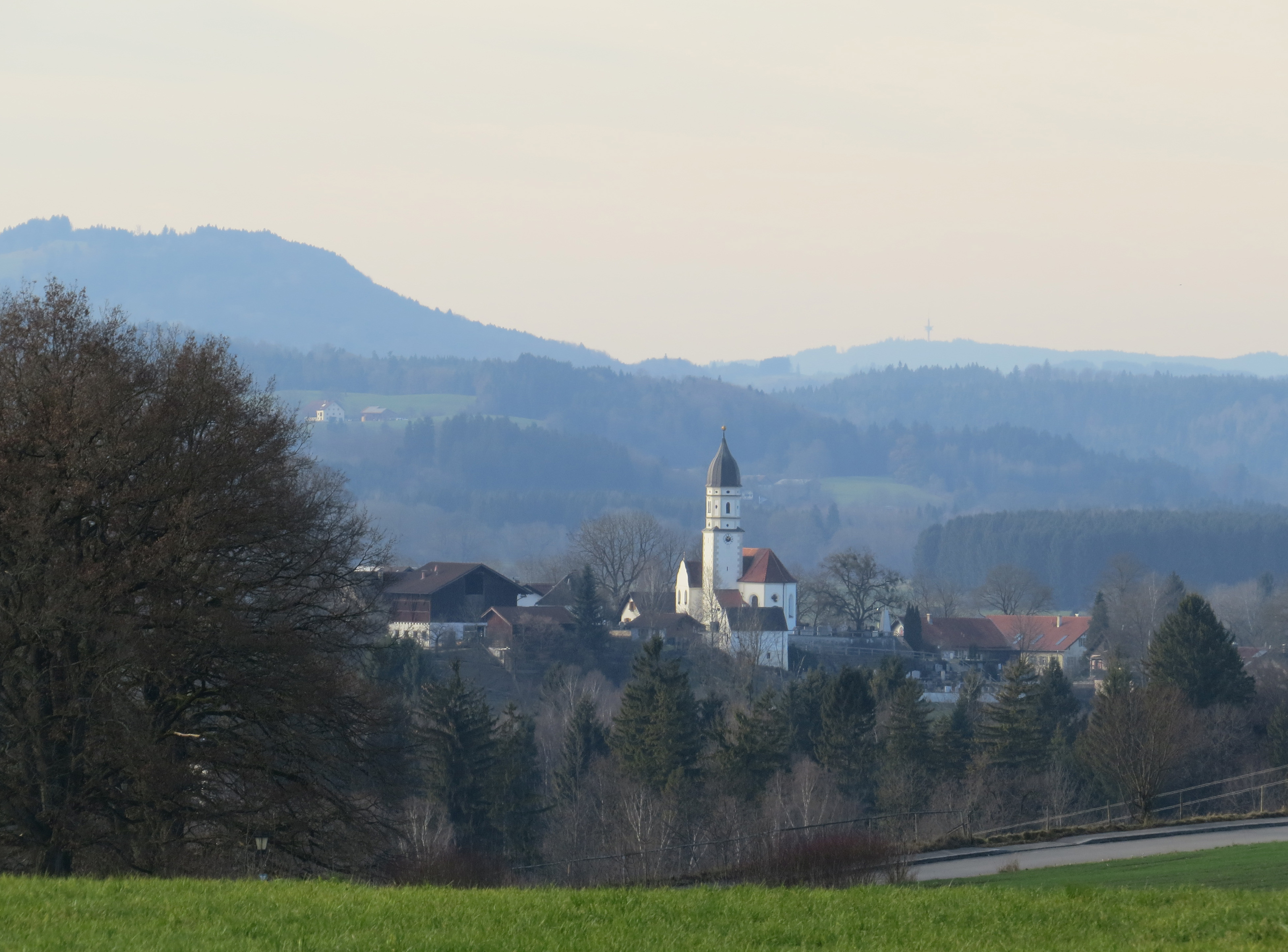
- Oberhausen seen from the northeast

- Coat of arms

- Location of Oberhausen within Weilheim-Schongau district
- Interactive map of Oberhausen
- Location within Germany Location within Bavaria
- Coordinates: 47°47′N 11°8′E
- Country: Germany
- State: Bavaria
- Admin. region: Oberbayern
- District: Weilheim-Schongau
- Municipal assoc.: Huglfing

Government
  - Mayor (2022–28): Rudolf Sonnleitner

Area
  - Total: 14.91 km^{2} (5.76 sq mi)
- Elevation: 590–663 m (1,936–2,175 ft)

Population (2025-12-31)
  - Total: 2,139
  - Density: 143.5/km^{2} (371.6/sq mi)
- Time zone: UTC+01:00 (CET)
  - Summer (DST): UTC+02:00 (CEST)
- Postal codes: 82386
- Dialling codes: 08802
- Vehicle registration: WM
- Website: www.oberhausen-obb.de

Oberhausen (German pronunciation: [ˈoːbɐhaʊzn̩]) is a municipality in the Weilheim-Schongau district, in Bavaria, Germany.
