= Hohenfurch =

- Municipality
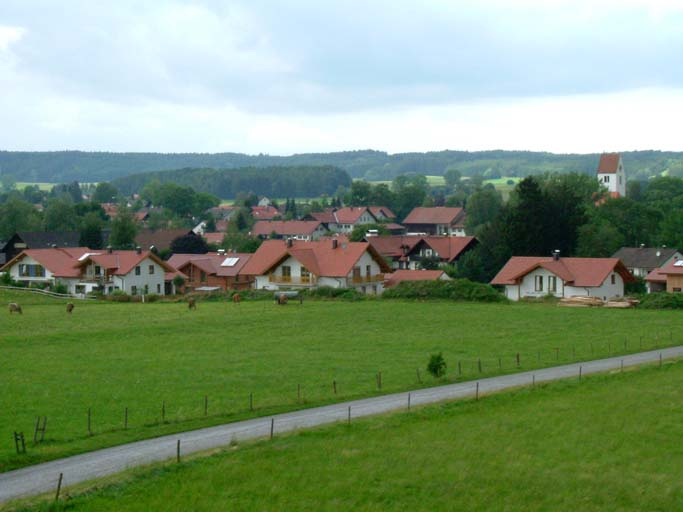
- Hohenfurch

- Coat of arms

- Location of Hohenfurch within Weilheim-Schongau district
- Interactive map of Hohenfurch
- Location within Germany Location within Bavaria
- Coordinates: 47°51′N 10°54′E
- Country: Germany
- State: Bavaria
- Admin. region: Oberbayern
- District: Weilheim-Schongau
- Municipal assoc.: Altenstadt

Government
  - Mayor (2020–26): Guntram Vogelsgesang (CSU)

Area
  - Total: 12.41 km^{2} (4.79 sq mi)
- Elevation: 699 m (2,293 ft)

Population (2025-12-31)
  - Total: 1,733
  - Density: 139.6/km^{2} (361.7/sq mi)
- Time zone: UTC+01:00 (CET)
  - Summer (DST): UTC+02:00 (CEST)
- Postal codes: 86978
- Dialling codes: 08861
- Vehicle registration: WM
- Website: www.hohenfurch.de

Hohenfurch is a municipality in the Weilheim-Schongau district, in Bavaria, Germany.
