= Weilheim-Schongau =

Coordinates: 47°50′N 11°00′E

- District
- Flag Coat of arms
- Country: Germany
- State: Bavaria
- Adm. region: Upper Bavaria
- Capital: Weilheim

Government
  - District admin.: Andrea Jochner-Weiß (CSU)

Area
  - Total: 966.22 km^{2} (373.06 sq mi)

Population (31 December 2025)
  - Total: 139,241
  - Density: 144.11/km^{2} (373.24/sq mi)
- Time zone: UTC+01:00 (CET)
  - Summer (DST): UTC+02:00 (CEST)
- Vehicle registration: WM, SOG
- Website: http://www.weilheim-schongau.de

Weilheim-Schongau is a Landkreis (district) in the south of Bavaria, Germany. Neighboring districts are (from the north clockwise) Landsberg, Starnberg, Bad Tölz-Wolfratshausen, Garmisch-Partenkirchen and Ostallgäu.

== Geography ==
The district is located in the northern foothills of the Alps. The main rivers of the district are the Lech and the Ammer. The Ammersee and the Starnberger See lakes are at the northern boundary of the district.

== History ==
The district was formed in 1972 by merging the former districts Weilheim and Schongau, and one municipality from the former district Marktoberdorf.

== Coat of arms ==
The coat of arms combines the symbols of the two precursor districts. The lion in top as the symbol of the Hohenstaufen dynasty was taken from the coat of arms of the district Weilheim. The crosier and the mining tools in the bottom are derived from the coat of arms of the district Schongau, symbolizing both the important monasteries as well as the coal mining in the district.

== Towns and municipalities ==
Clickable map of towns and municipalities in the district

Towns
1. Penzberg
2. Schongau
3. Weilheim i.OB

Markt

1. Peißenberg
2. Peiting
Municipalities
1. Bernried
2. Hohenpeißenberg
3. Pähl
4. Polling
5. Raisting
6. Wessobrunn
7. Wielenbach

Verwaltungsgemeinschaften
1. Altenstadt; 1. Altenstadt^{1}; 2. Hohenfurch; 3. Ingenried; 4. Schwabbruck; 5. Schwabsoien	2. Bernbeuren; 1. Bernbeuren^{1}; 2. Burggen; 3. Habach; 1. Antdorf; 2. Habach^{1}; 3. Obersöchering; 4. Sindelsdorf	4. Huglfing; 1. Eberfing; 2. Eglfing; 3. Huglfing^{1}; 4. Oberhausen; 5. Rottenbuch; 1. Böbing; 2. Rottenbuch^{1}	6. Seeshaupt; 1. Iffeldorf; 2. Seeshaupt^{1}; 7. Steingaden; 1. Prem; 2. Steingaden^{1}; 3. Wildsteig
^{1}seat of the Verwaltungsgemeinschaft
