= Schwabsoien =

- Municipality
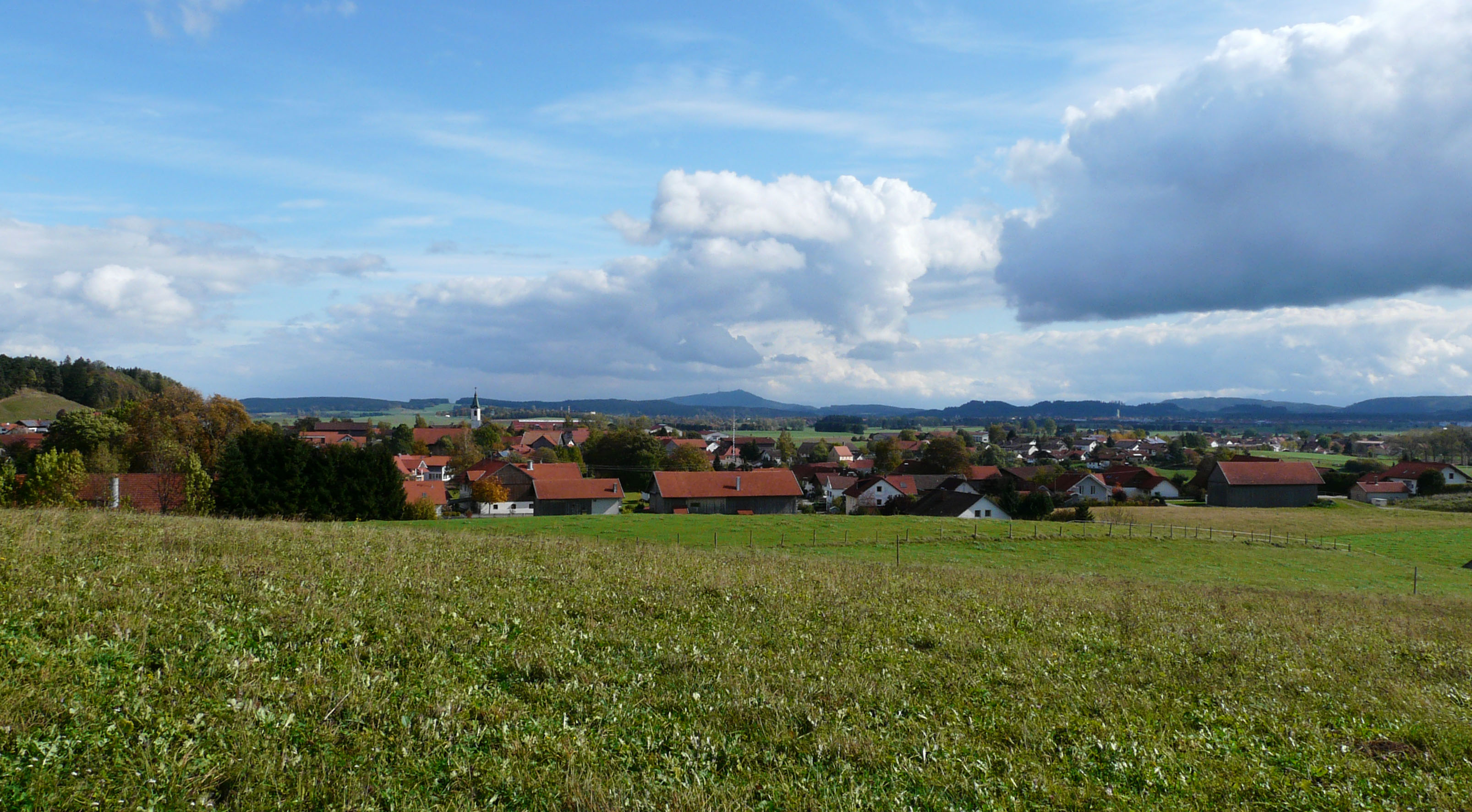
- Schwabsoien seen from the west

- Coat of arms

- Location of Schwabsoien within Weilheim-Schongau district
- Interactive map of Schwabsoien
- Location within Germany Location within Bavaria
- Coordinates: 47°50′N 10°50′E
- Country: Germany
- State: Bavaria
- Admin. region: Oberbayern
- District: Weilheim-Schongau
- Municipal assoc.: Altenstadt

Government
  - Mayor (2020–26): Manfred Schmid

Area
  - Total: 17.02 km^{2} (6.57 sq mi)
- Elevation: 746 m (2,448 ft)

Population (2025-12-31)
  - Total: 1,433
  - Density: 84.20/km^{2} (218.1/sq mi)
- Time zone: UTC+01:00 (CET)
  - Summer (DST): UTC+02:00 (CEST)
- Postal codes: 86987
- Dialling codes: 08868
- Vehicle registration: WM
- Website: www.schwabsoien.de

Schwabsoien is a municipality in the Weilheim-Schongau district, in Bavaria, Germany.
