= Bundesstraße 17 =

Federal highway in Germany

B 17
- Bundesstraße 17

Route information
- Length: 110 km (68 mi)

Major junctions
- North end: Gersthofen
- South end: Füssen

Location
- Country: Germany
- States: Bavaria

Highway system
- Roads in Germany; Autobahns; List; Federal; List; State; E-roads

The Bundesstraße 17 (abbr. B17) is a German federal highway, running some 110 kilometres from Gersthofen to the Austrian border near Füssen, along the Lech river. From north to south; it passes through cities such as Augsburg, Landsberg am Lech, Schongau, Peiting, Steingaden and Schwangau.

It corresponds to a long portion of the Romantic Road and overlaps the ancient Roman road Via Claudia Augusta.

== Exit list ==
The entire route is located in Bavaria.

State	District	Location	km	mi	Exit	Name	Destinations	Notes
Bavaria	Augsburg (district)	Gersthofen				Kreuz Augsburg-West	A 8 – München, Ingolstadt ( B 300), Augsburg-Ost, Augsburg Airport A 8 – Stuttgart B 2 – Nuremberg, Donauwörth, Gersthofen-Mitte	Northern terminus of highway
Bavaria	Augsburg (district)	Gersthofen				Gersthofen-Süd	Gersthofen-Süd, Augsburg-Oberhausen, Stadtbach	Southbound exit and northbound entrance only
Bavaria	Augsburg	Augsburg				Stuttgarter Straße	Augsburg-Oberhausen, Gersthofen-Südwest, GVZ, Postzentren, Ikea	
Bavaria	Augsburg	Augsburg				Holzweg	Augsburg-Bärenkeller, Oberhausen-Süd, Josefinum	
Bavaria	Augsburg	Augsburg				Kobelweg	Neusäß, Augsburg-Kriegshaber, Uniklinik	
Bavaria	Augsburg	Augsburg				Tunnelstraße	southbound entrance and exit only	private street
Bavaria	Augsburg	Augsburg				Bürgermeister-Ackermann-Straße	B 300 – Memmingen Augsburg-Zentrum, Kriegshaber-Süd, -Pfersee-Nord,	Northern endpoint of concurrency with B 300
Bavaria	Augsburg (district)	Stadtbergen				Pfersee	Augsburg-Pfersee, Stadtbergen, Leitershofen	Leitershofen signed northbound only
Bavaria	Augsburg	Augsburg				Leitershofener Straße	Leitershofen, Augsburg-Pfersee-Süd, Sheridanpark	Sheridanpark signed northbound only
Bavaria	Augsburg	Augsburg				Gabelsbergerstraße	Göggingen, Kurhaus, Hessing Kliniken	
Bavaria	Augsburg	Augsburg				Eichleitnerstraße	Göggingen-Ost, Alte Universität, Zollamt, TÜV, Kongress am Park	
Bavaria	Augsburg	Augsburg				Messe	B 300 – Friedberg Augsburg-Messe, Universität, Zoo, Botanischer Garten, Augsburg-Zentrum	Southern endpoint of concurrency with B 300 Augsburg-Zentrum signed northbound only incomplete Cloverleaf interchange, no westbound connection from highway
Bavaria	Augsburg	Augsburg				Augsburg-Göggingen	Augsburg-Göggingen, Arena	Southbound exit only
Bavaria	Augsburg	Augsburg				Augsburg Haunstetten-Nord	Augsburg Haunstetten-Nord, Augsburg-Haunstetten business park, Innovationspark, Arena	Arena signed northbound only
Bavaria	Augsburg	Augsburg				Augsburg-Inningen	Augsburg-Inningen, Haunstetten-Süd, Klinikum-Süd	
Bavaria	Augsburg (district)	Königsbrunn				Königsbrunn-Nord	Königsbrunn-Nord	Trumpet interchange
Bavaria	Augsburg (district)	Königsbrunn				Königsbrunn-Süd	Königsbrunn-Süd, Bobingen, Mering	
Bavaria	Augsburg (district)	Kleinaitingen				Oberottmarshausen	Oberottmarshausen, Lechfeld-Nord, Ulrichkaserne	
Bavaria	Augsburg (district)	Graben, Bavaria				Kleinaitingen	Kleinaitingen, Graben, Schwabmünchen-Nord, Logistikzentren, Lechfeldkaserne	Graben, Lechfeldkaserne signed southbound only
Bavaria	Augsburg (district)	Untermeitingen				Lagerlechfeld	Lagerlechfeld, Untermeitingen, Schwabmünchen-Süd, Lechfeld business park, Lechfeldkaserne, Graben	Untermeitingen signed southbound only, Graben signed northbound only
Bavaria	Augsburg (district)	Klosterlechfeld				Klosterlechfeld	Klosterlechfeld, Obermeitingen, Geltendorf (Munich S-Bahn), Klosterlechfeld business park, Untermeitingen	Obermeitingen signed southbound only, Untermeitingen signed northbound only
Bavaria	Landsberg (district)	Obermeitingen			Parking area	Lechfeld	Parking area Lechfeld	northbound only
Bavaria	Landsberg (district)	Hurlach				Hurlach	Hurlach, Kaufering, Obermeitingen	Obermeitingen signed northbound only
Bavaria	Landsberg (district)	Hurlach			Parking area	Hurlach	Parking area Hurlach	Southbound only
Bavaria	Landsberg (district)	Igling				Igling	Igling, Kaufering-Süd	
Bavaria	Landsberg (district)	Landsberg am Lech				Landsberg am Lech West	A 96 – Lindau A 96 – München Landsberg, Frauenwald business park, Lechwiesen business park	Largest roundabout in Germany Southern endpoint of 4-lane limited-access highway
Bavaria	Landsberg (district)	Landsberg am Lech				Landsberg-Süd	Landsberg-Süd, Altstadt	Altstadt signed northbound only
Bavaria	Landsberg (district)	Landsberg am Lech				Isotex-Straße	Isotex-Straße	Northbound entrance only
Bavaria	Landsberg (district)	Landsberg am Lech					Erpfting, Friedheim, Fa. Bachl, Fa. 3C-Carbon	At-grade junction
Bavaria	Landsberg (district)	Unterdießen				Waal	Waal, Unterdießen, Dornstetten	
Bavaria	Landsberg (district)	Fuchstal					Fuchstal-Seestall, KZ-Gedenkstätte	At grade junction
Bavaria	Landsberg (district)	Fuchstal					Kaufbeuren, Fuchstal-Asch	At grade junction
Bavaria	Landsberg (district)	Fuchstal				Fuchstal-Leeder	Fuchstal-Leeder, Mundraching, Lechmühlen, Ammersee, Vilgertshofen	
Bavaria	Landsberg (district)	Denklingen					Schwabsoien, Denklingen	At grade junction
Bavaria	Landsberg (district)	Denklingen				Reichling	Reichling, Epfach, Denklingen	Reichling signed southbound only
Bavaria	Landsberg (district)	Denklingen				Reichling	Epfach, Neuhof, Reichling	Reichling signed northbound only
Bavaria	Landsberg (district)	Kinsau					Dießen, Kinsau	At grade junction
Bavaria	Weilheim-Schongau	Hohenfurch					Hohenfurch-Nord business park	At grade junction
Bavaria	Weilheim-Schongau	Hohenfurch					Schwabniederhofen	At grade junction
Bavaria	Weilheim-Schongau	Hohenfurch					Hohenfurch-Tal business park	Southbound exit and entrance only
Bavaria	Weilheim-Schongau	Hohenfurch			Parking area		Parking area	Southbound only
Bavaria	Weilheim-Schongau	Schongau				Schongau-Nord	Schongau-Nord, Hohenfurch business park	At grade junction
Bavaria	Weilheim-Schongau	Schongau				Schongau-Mitte	Schongau-Mitte, Altenstadt, Franz-Josef-Strauss-Kaserne, Romanische Basilika	
Bavaria	Weilheim-Schongau	Schongau				Schongau-West	B 472 – Kempten, Kaufbeuren, Marktoberdorf, Schongau-West, Historische Altstadt	Northern terminus of B 472 concurrency
Bavaria	Weilheim-Schongau	Schongau			Parking area	Lechbrücke	Parking area Lechbrücke	
Bavaria	Weilheim-Schongau	Peiting				Peiting-West	B 472 / B 23 – Bad Tölz, Weilheim, Garmisch-Partenkirchen, Peiting-Süd	Southern terminus of B 472 concurrency Southern endpoint of limited access road, southern junctions are at grade
Bavaria	Weilheim-Schongau	Steingaden			Parking area		Parking area	
Bavaria	Weilheim-Schongau	Steingaden					Butzau, Deutenried, Riesen, Hirschau	
Bavaria	Weilheim-Schongau	Steingaden				St 2058	Rottenbuch, Rudersau	Connection to B 23
Bavaria	Weilheim-Schongau	Steingaden				Ammergauer Straße	B 23 – Garmisch-Partenkirchen, Wildsteig	
Bavaria	Weilheim-Schongau	Steingaden				Lechbrucker Straße	Lechbruck, Urspring, Prem, Gründl	
Bavaria	Weilheim-Schongau	Steingaden			Parking area		Parking area	
Bavaria	Weilheim-Schongau	Steingaden					Prem, Sauwald	
Bavaria	Ostallgäu	Halblech				Königsstraße	Unterreithen	
Bavaria	Ostallgäu	Halblech				Ried	Ried	
Bavaria	Ostallgäu	Halblech				Lechbrucker Straße	Lechbruck, Prem	
Bavaria	Ostallgäu	Halblech				Schmiedstraße	Roßhaupten, Berghof	
Bavaria	Ostallgäu	Halblech			Parking area			
Bavaria	Ostallgäu	Schwangau				Schloßstraße	Hohenschwangau, Königsschlösser	
Bavaria	Ostallgäu	Schwangau				St 2008	Hohenschwangau, Königsschlösser	No southbound turn
Bavaria	Ostallgäu	Schwangau				Füssener Straße / Lechbrücke	B 16 – Austria ( A 7), Kaufbeuren, Kempten, Füssen, Marktoberdorf	Austria signed southbound only, Marktoberdorf signed northbound only
Bavaria	Ostallgäu	Füssen				Border Germany-Austria	L 396 – Reutte/Tirol, Austria	Southern terminus of highway
Bavaria	1.000 mi = 1.609 km; 1.000 km = 0.621 mi: Concurrency terminus; Incomplete access; Proposed; Route transition							
