= Bundesautobahn 91 =

Federal motorway in Germany

A 91
- Bundesautobahn 91
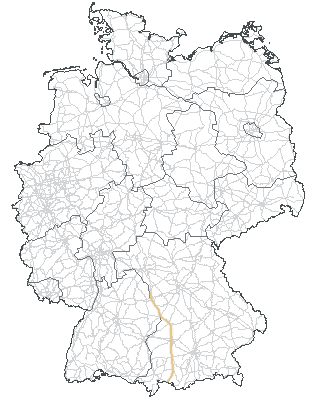
- Planned route of the A 91

Major junctions
- A 7

Location
- Country: Germany
- States: Baden-Württemberg, Bavaria

Highway system
- Roads in Germany; Autobahns; List; Federal; List; State; E-roads

Bundesautobahn 91 (translates from German as Federal Motorway 91, short form Autobahn 91, abbreviated as BAB 91 or A 91) was a planned autobahn in Germany, supposed to connect Feuchtwangen with Füssen. Parts of the planned construction have been carried out as Bundesstraße 2 and Bundesstraße 17, however further building activities were postponed.

== Exit list ==
Legend:

- I/C - Interchange, I/S - Intersection, RSA - Rest and service area, OBR - Overhead bridge restaurant, R/R - Restaurant and rest plaza, L/B - Layby, V/P - Vista point, TN - tunnel, T/P - Toll plaza, BR - Bridge
- C - Cloverleaf, S - Stack, T-A - Trumpet-A, T-B - Trumpet-B, DT - Directional-T/Y, SDT - Semi-Directional-T/Y, P-Y - Partial-Y, D - Diamond, P-C - Partial cloverleaf, D-D - Diverging diamond, D-R - Direct ramp

Location	km	mi	Exit	Name	Destinations	Notes
N/A				Feuchtwangen	A 7	Planned 3-way interchange
N/A				Schopfloch		Planned
N/A				Dinkelsbühl		Planned
N/A				Fremdingen		Planned
N/A				Oettingen		Planned
N/A				Harburg		Planned
N/A				Donauwörth	A 77	Planned 3-way interchange
N/A			built as B 2			
N/A				Donauwörth-Stadtmitte / Nord	B 25	
N/A				Donauwörth-Parkstadt		Southbound
N/A			Talbrücke Broderle			
N/A			Donauwörth parking area			
N/A				Donauwörth-Parkstadt		Northbound
N/A			Hangbrücke Schellenberg (Length: 280 m)			
N/A			Donaubrücke (Length: m)			
N/A				Donauwörth-Süd		
N/A				Asbach-Bäumenheim-Nord	B 16	
N/A				Asbach-Bäumenheim-Süd		
N/A				Mertingen		
N/A				Nordendorf		
N/A				Westendorf		
N/A				Meitingen-Nord		
N/A				Meitingen-West		
N/A				Biberbach		
N/A				Langweid-Nord		
N/A				Langweid-Süd		
N/A			Grünbrücke Tunnel (Length: 60 m)			
N/A				Stettenhofen		
N/A				Gersthofen-Bergstraße		
N/A				Gersthofen-Nord		
N/A				Gersthofen-Mitte		
N/A			72	Augsburg-West	A 8	
N/A				Augsburg-Oberhausen		Southbound
N/A			Built as B 17			
N/A				Augsburg-Oberhausen / Gersthofen-Süd		
N/A			Bärenkellertunnel Tunnel (60 m)			
N/A				A.-Bärenkeller		
N/A				A.-Kriegshaber		
N/A			Tunnel (90 m)			
N/A				A.-Zentrum	B 300	
N/A			Tunnel (210 m)			
N/A			Bismarcktunneltunnel Tunnel (265 m)			
N/A				Stadtbergen / Leitershofen		
N/A				A.-Pfersee		
N/A			Wertachbrücke (100 m)			
N/A			Singoldbrücke (50 m)			
N/A				A.-Göggingen		
N/A				A.-Eichleitnerstraße		
N/A				A.-Messezentrum		
N/A				A.-Haunstetten		
N/A				A.-Inningen		
N/A				Königsbrunn-Nord		
N/A				Königsbrunn-Süd / Bobingen		
N/A				Oberottmarshausen		
N/A			Lagerlechfeld Filling station (southbound)			
N/A			Lagerlechfeld Filling station (northbound)			
N/A				Kleinaitingen		
N/A				Lagerlechfeld		
N/A				Klosterlechfeld		
N/A				Obermeitingen		Planned in 2009
N/A				Hurlach		Planned in 2009
N/A				Igling		Planned in 2009
N/A				Landsberg am Lech-Ost		Under construction, 2009
N/A				Landsberg am Lech-Süd		
N/A			Built as B 17			
N/A				Unterdießen		Planned
N/A				Hohenwart		Planned
N/A				Denkling		Planned
N/A				Hohenfucrch		Planned
N/A			Built as B 17			
N/A				Schongau-Mitte		
N/A				Schongau-Süd	B 472	
N/A			parking area			
N/A			Lechbrücke (566 m)			
N/A			Built as B 17			
N/A				Peiting		Planned
N/A				Steingaden		Planned
N/A				Jagdberg		Planned
N/A				Lechbrücke		Planned
N/A				Lechbruck		Planned
N/A				Rosshaupten		Planned
N/A				Rosshaupten	A 7	Planned 3-way interchange
1.000 mi = 1.609 km; 1.000 km = 0.621 mi: Concurrency terminus; Proposed; Unopened
