= Innenstadt =

Innenstadt (German: inner city) may refer to:

- Innenstadt (Braunschweig), a district of Braunschweig, Germany
- Innenstadt, Cologne, a district of Cologne, Germany
- Innenstadt (Frankfurt am Main), a district of Frankfurt am Main, Germany
- Augsburg-Innenstadt, a district of Augsburg, Germany
- Innenstadt (Linz), a district of Linz, Austria
- Innere Stadt, a district of Vienna, Austria

== See also ==
- Inner city (disambiguation)
