= 2+1 road =

Design of road

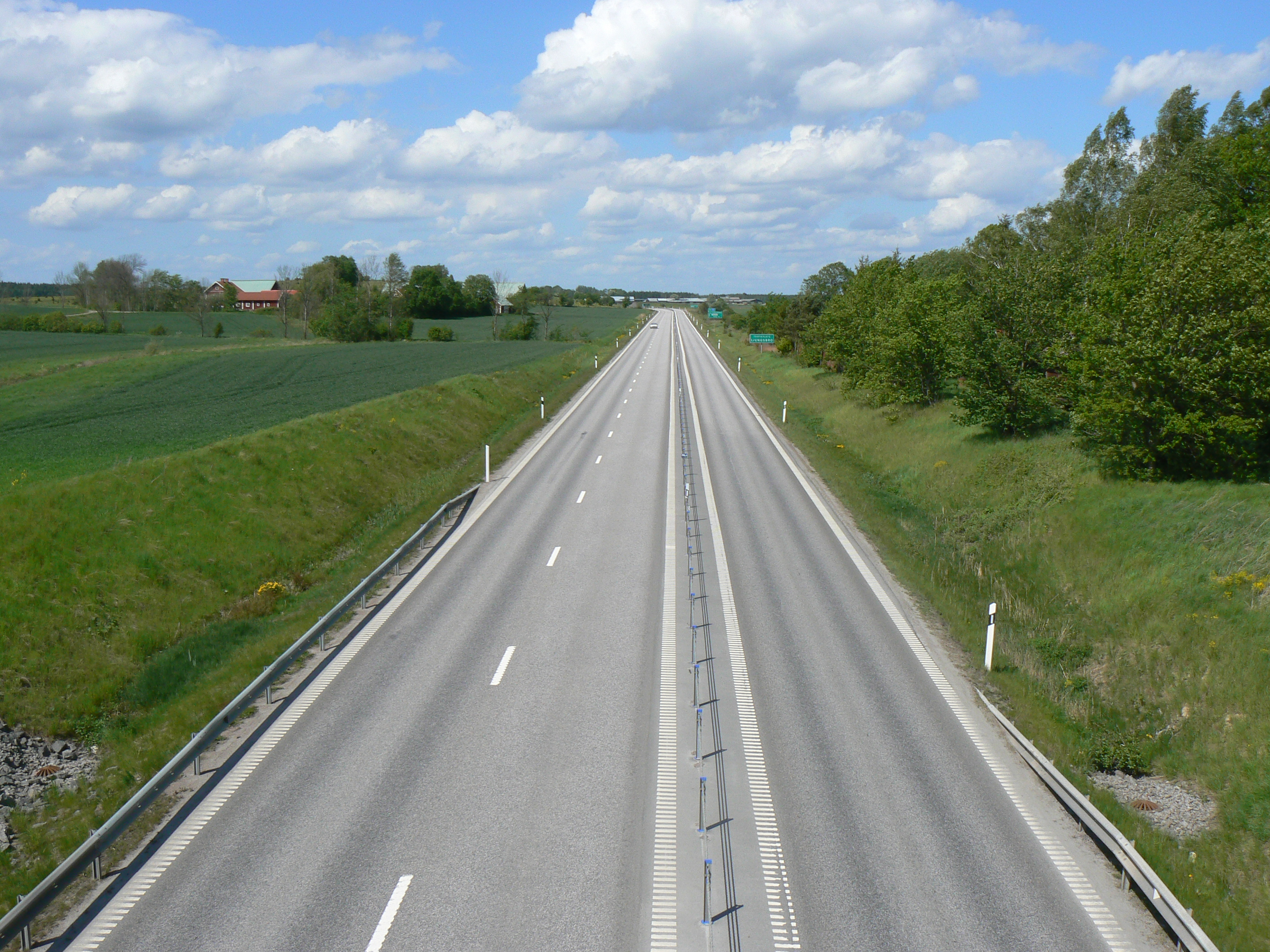
2+1 road with cable barrier on Road 34 near Linköping, Sweden. Classified as motortrafikled (expressway).

Scheme of a 2+1 road

Driving on a Swedish 2+1 road as it narrows from two lanes to one

2+1 road is a specific category of three-lane road, consisting of two lanes in one direction and one lane in the other, alternating every few kilometres, and usually separated with a steel cable barrier. The second lane allows faster-moving traffic to overtake slower vehicles at regular intervals. Traditional roads of at least 10 metres (33 ft) width can be converted to 2+1 roads and reach near-motorway safety levels at a much lower cost than an actual conversion to motorway or dual carriageway.

Sometimes, during freeway reconstruction, a barrier transfer machine will be used on one half of the freeway while the other is being reconstructed.

== By country ==
=== Canada ===
In 2023 the province of Ontario announced an assessment and design contract was awarded to convert Highway 11 north of North Bay to a 2+1 design; once the design has been finalized there will be a tender to build it. Quebec’s Autoroute 50 mostly follows a 2+1 design.

=== Estonia ===
The construction of 2+1 roads in Estonia first started in autumn 2016, when a contract for a reconstruction of a 9 kilometre section of the national road 4 between Ääsmäe and Kohatu into a 2+1 road was signed. The road is being reconstructed as a 15-metre-wide (49 ft) 2+1 road, equipped with barriers along the entire length.

Also there are several sections of the national road 2 between Põltsamaa and Tartu planned for a conversion into 2+1 road. The first of them (Annikvere-Neanurme) was opened in November 2017. The speed limits are 100 km/h (60 mph) during summer and 90 km/h (55 mph) during winter.

=== Finland ===
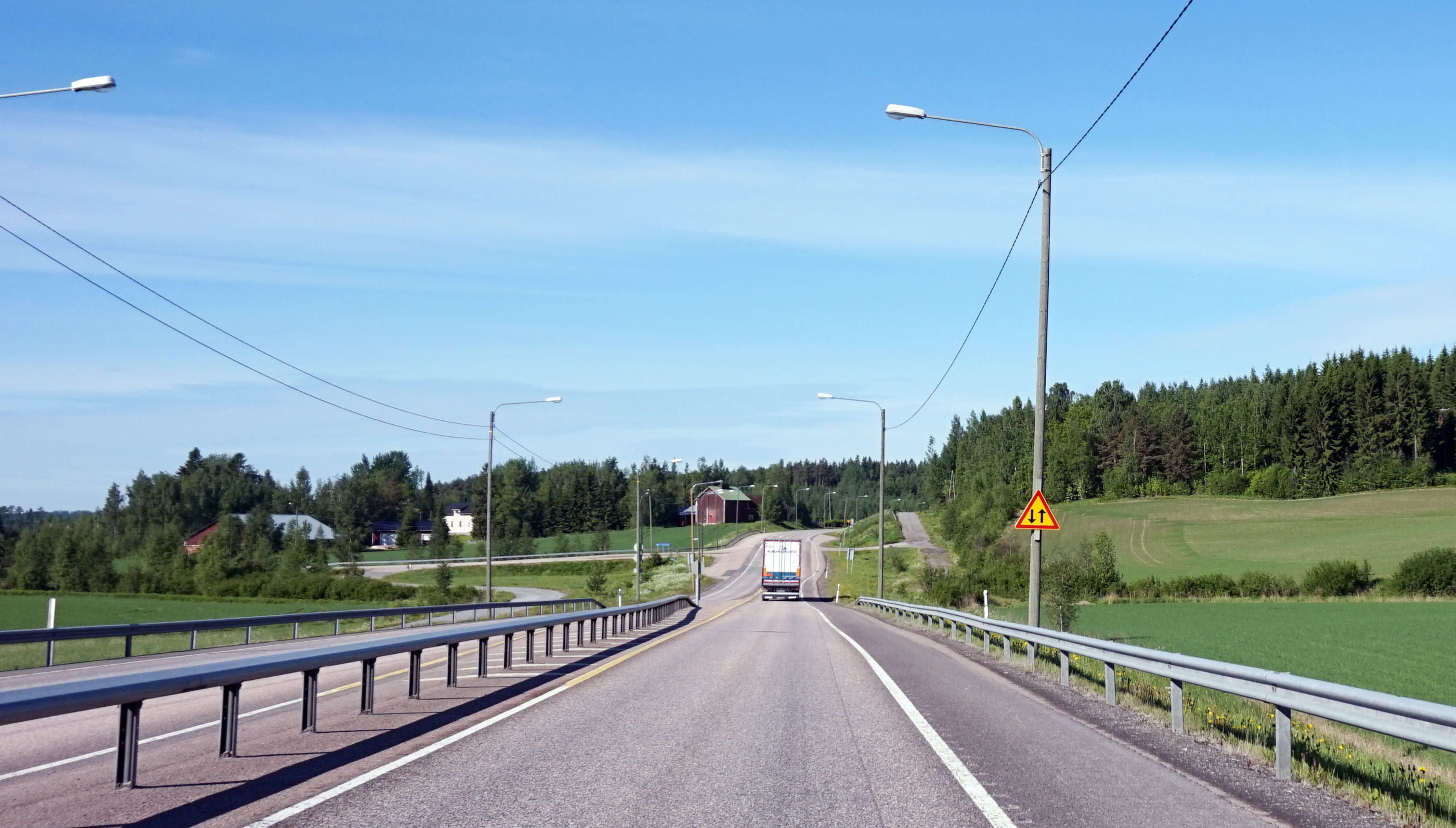
2+1 section of the Finnish national road 9 in Orivesi, Pirkanmaa, Finland

The first 2+1 road in Finland was opened in 1991 on Finnish national road 4 between Järvenpää and Mäntsälä, which later was upgraded to a motorway. Since then, numerous 2+1 roads have been built as part of the national road network. They resemble motorways in that they are typically, although not always, limited-access roads and have no at-grade interchanges. In the mid-1990s, 2+1 roads with traffic separators were introduced; these are effective in preventing head-on collisions and improving the safety of motorways. In 2006, there were 440 km of 2+1 roads, e.g., along road 3 and road 4. However, they weren't that much of a panacea: interchanges made the roads much more expensive than planned and confusing to drivers. Thus, new construction halted and only 2+2 roads with traffic separators were built. These are, however, more expensive and require more widening of the road.

=== Germany ===
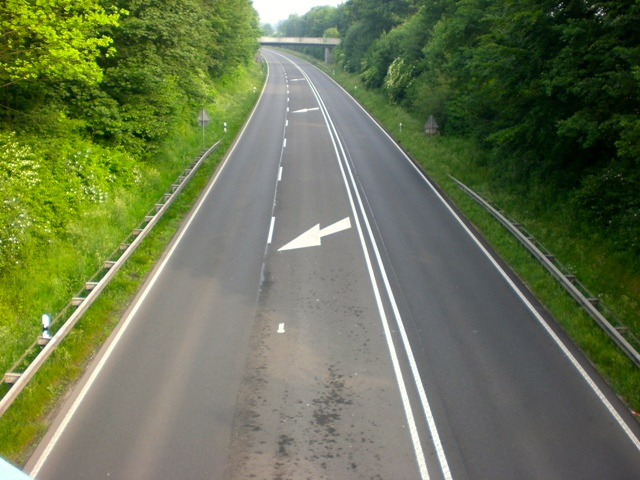
2+1 section of B54 near Steinfurt

The "2+1 system" refers to expressways with three lanes on a single carriageway where bypassing on the lane of the opposite direction is prohibited so that speed restriction is not required to increase safety. These expressways are grade-separated with a design speed of 100 to 120 km/h (60 to 75 mph) and the side of two lanes (allowing to bypass lower speed vehicles) alternates about every 1.5 to 2 kilometres. In hilly parts, the uphill direction is usually the one with two lanes to allow overtaking of heavy, slow vehicles. In many cases, there is no median barrier or it consists of concrete blocks – additional safety measures are mostly needed near the end of the two lane section where some motorists tend to pull in very late so that a longer no-traffic section needs to be inserted on the middle lane.

After some good experiences with test roads the system has been used often in places where the amount of traffic does not justify construction of a dual carriageway expressway but remote rural areas should be connected to major towns with a high speed road. Existing examples are B 1, B 4 near Uelzen, B 16, B 20, B 31n near Stockach (120 km/h (75 mph)), B 33, B 54, B 56n, B 67 between Bocholt-West and Borken, B 72, B 210, B 300, B 473 between Bocholt and Hamminkeln, B 482 and parts of the A 98.

=== Israel ===
In Israel, route 437 is a 2+1 from Hizme Junction to Adam Junction. The road descends before ascending, and whichever direction is uphill is the one with two lanes.

=== Ireland ===
In the Republic of Ireland, a 2+1 road was tried on a short section of the N20 near Mallow, County Cork and the N2 near Castleblayney, County Monaghan. Following the pilot, the National Roads Authority announced in July 2007 that 2+1 roads were unsuitable and that new lower capacity trunk routes would instead be built as 2+2 roads (officially known as "Type 2 Dual Carriageways") – at grade dual-carriageways with a narrow median and no hard shoulder.

=== Lithuania ===
The first rural 2+1 road section finished in Lithuania was a short 1.5 km road section of A11 between Šiauliai and the junction with the A18 road (Šiauliai Bypass). It was opened in late 2017.

All 1+1 sections of Via Baltica north of Kaunas up to the Latvian border are planned to be converted to 2+1 by 2035. The first section, the A17 road or Panevėžys Bypass was constructed in 2019. Work took place in stages. The first 10 km section between junctions with the A8 and the A9 was finished in summer 2018. The remaining section up to the A10 road was completed in 2019.

All planned 2+1 sections will be equipped with barriers.

=== New Zealand ===
In New Zealand, there are few 2+1 roads, although regular isolated 'passing lanes' exist frequently throughout the country, mainly in heavily trafficked areas and on hills. A trial of a 2+1 road with a wire-rope median barrier was undertaken on SH1 between Longswamp and Rangiriri south of Auckland, and there are plans to introduce more 2+1 roads. NZ research also investigated the design and operational effects of 2+1 roads to establish the most appropriate configurations for the country.

=== Portugal ===
In Portugal, there are plenty of 2+1 roads. Almost every national road in the country has a 2+1 profile, but most are located in the north because of the hills (for example, in Beira Baixa, or Viseu). One example of this is the N2 road, which goes from Faro (Algarve) to Chaves. This type of road is not frequently used on parts of roads that have a village near, except in the Lisbon District, where most of them have that profile. In Portugal, there are four major types of roads: a national road (N) which sometimes contains the 2+1 profile; a complementary route (IC), which always contains the 2+1 profile, except inside villages; a principal route (IP) which either contains the 2+1 profile (with the IC profile) or the 2+2 profile (with the A profile); and a highway (A) which has its own profiles, like 2+2, 3+3 or 4+4.

=== Romania ===
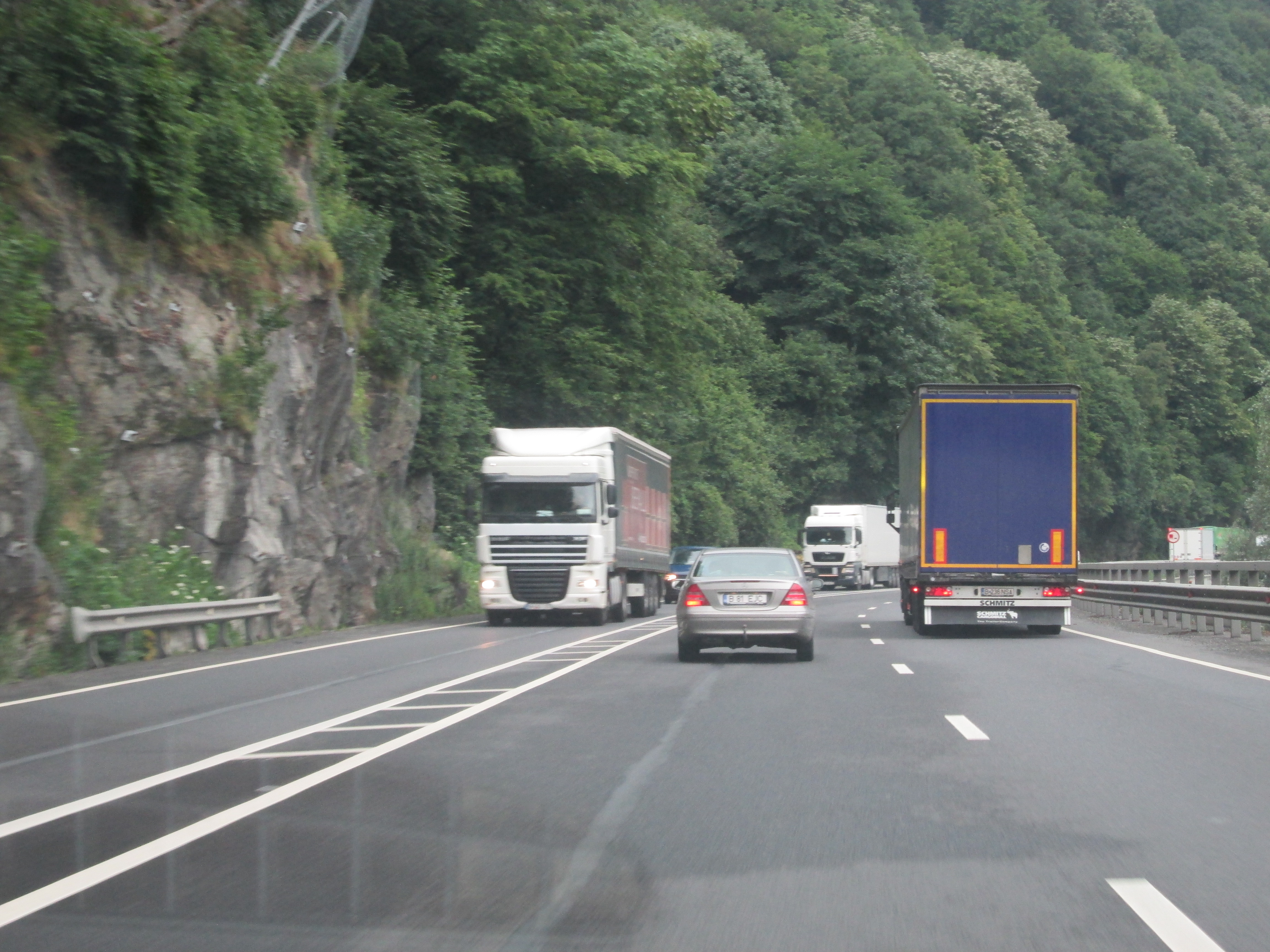
The first 2+1 road section in Romania on the DN7. Note the lack of separating barriers.

The 2+1 road format in Romania often refers to sections, usually on steep inclines, where there is another lane, designed to be used by slow vehicles to avoid congestion when going uphill.

The first 2+1 "alternative" road opened between Lazaret and Turnul Spart in 2018 on the Olt Valley section of the DN7. This section lacks cable barriers, but provisions have been made to install one, if needed. The next 2+1 road section to open will be between Sinești and Movilița on the DN2. The DN2 is currently configured as a 13 m wide road with emergency lanes, in the same style as 13 m wide roads in Sweden, however, drivers improperly use the emergency lanes, leading to the current high number of crashes.

Once the roadworks will be completed, the 2+1 road is supposed to reduce the number of crashes, but it will lack the essential cable barrier. This is because the only cable barrier installed in Romania, at Afumați on the same DN2 was damaged because the lanes were too close to it and a truck hit it, but instead, the Romanian Roads Administration (CNADNR) blamed the "unsafety" of the barrier.

=== Russia ===
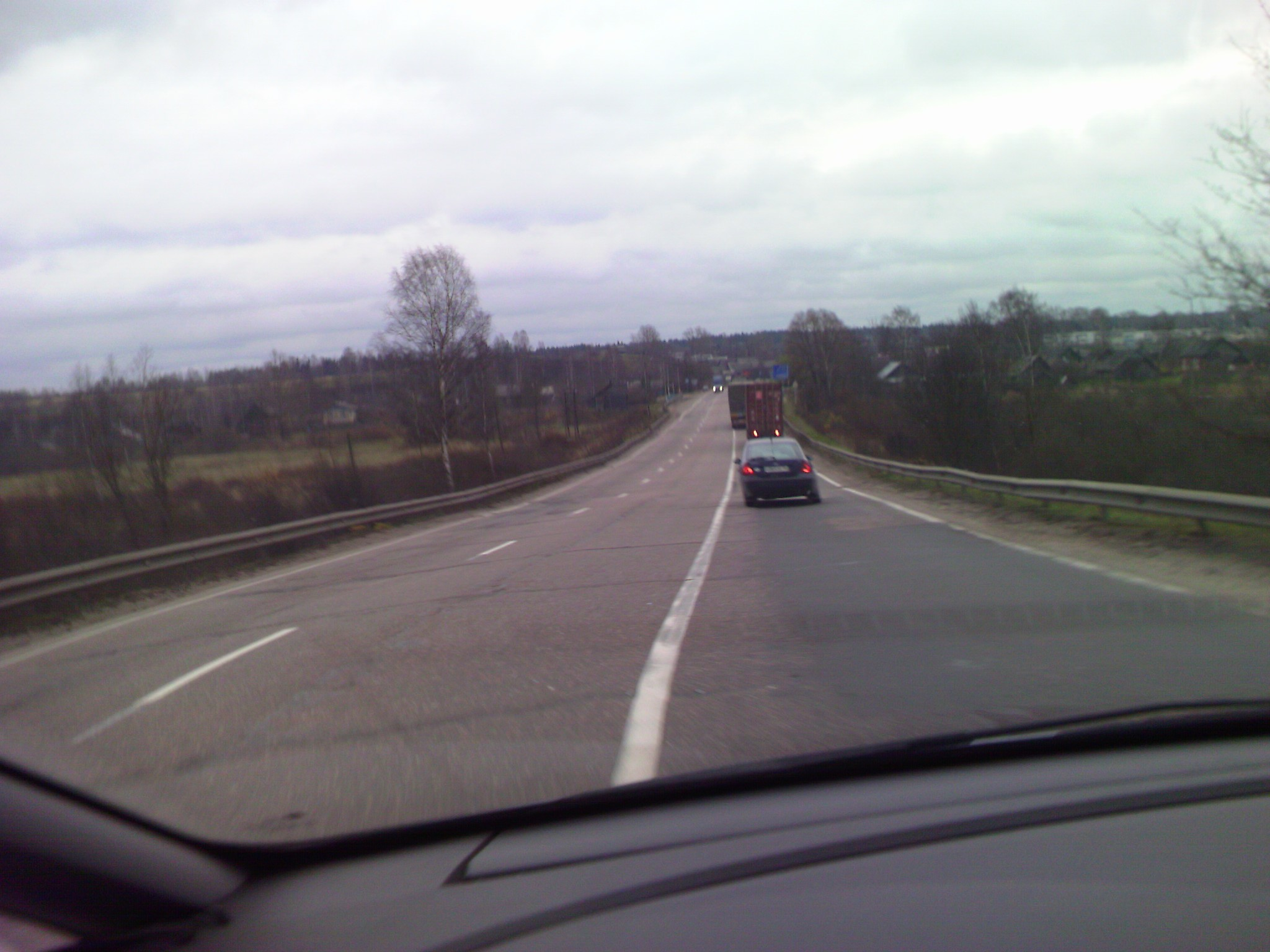
M10 road in Kresttsy. Due to the bad condition of road surface, a huge number of fatalities still happen.

Some federal roads use the 2+1 design. The length of overtaking sections is 400 to 3,000 metres. Unlike in Western Europe, the majority of Russian 2+1 roads are not equipped with barriers and have a mediocre quality of the road surface. The most well-known example of a 2+1 is the M-10 road section between Tver and Novgorod Oblast. Other than that, the 2+1 roads are particularly popular in Krasnodar Krai and Sakhalin Oblast.

=== Sweden ===
In Sweden, many 13-metre-wide (43 ft) roads have been built, especially in the period 1955–1980. These have two 3.5-metre-wide (11 ft) lanes, and two 3-metre-wide (9.8 ft) shoulders, in the beginning planned as emergency strip, due to the relative unreliability of cars of that period.

Around 1990, the idea emerged to build fences in the middle of them and to have 2+1 lanes. This was thought to be a cheap way of increasing traffic safety since these roads had a bad safety record of many head-on collisions at high speeds. Some people were, for example, overtaking against meeting traffic assuming meeting cars would go to the side. The roads are a little narrow for 3 lanes, but trials were carried out on a few roads. It turned out that not only did safety improve, but it was also easier to overtake than before as the 2-lane sections provide safe overtaking opportunities. After the year 2000, more than 1,000 km (620 mi) of roads in Sweden have been converted from wide ordinary roads into 2+1-road, all with barriers.

Until around 2005, the roads had the original 90 km/h (56 mph) speed limit in use on most highways. As a result of this, many people drove at 90 km/h at one-lane parts but 110 km/h (68 mph) at 2-lane parts, this being the speed limit on motorways. The speed limit has now been changed to 100 km/h (62 mph) with a notably smoother traffic flow. There is a problem that some people want to overtake as many slow cars as possible in the two-lane sections, sometimes with small margins at the end of the section.

=== United Kingdom ===
In the UK, 2+1 roads are known as 'Wide single 2+1 roads'. According to the Design Manual for Roads and Bridges, they should only be used on rural all-purpose single carriageways. The overtaking lane sections can be between 800 metres and 1500 metres. This is because this length allows for cars to overtake, but does not cause frustration for drivers on single-lane sections. It is recommended to use hatching with double solid lines to separate traffic flows to stop single-lane traffic from using the oncoming overtaking lane. 2+1 roads can also be used for climbing lanes, to allow slower vehicles to be overtaken by other vehicles when travelling uphill on a single carriageway. They should be used where the road is longer than 500 metres at a gradient of 2%.

=== United States ===
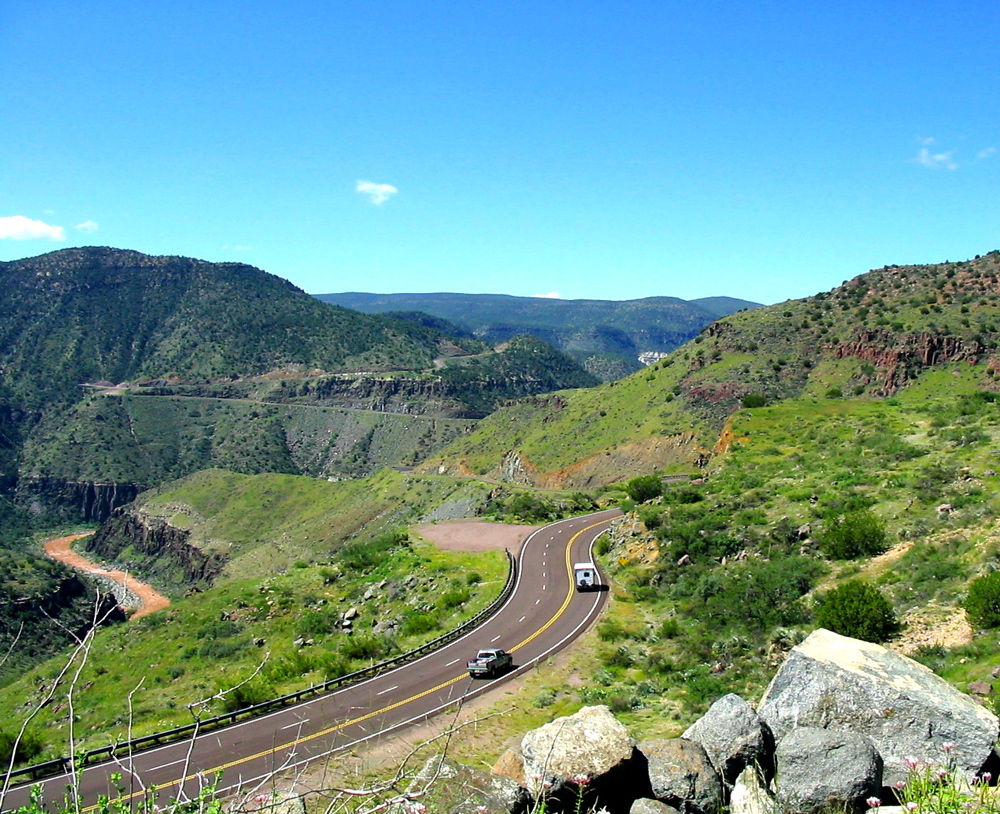
Arizona State Route 77

The United States has 2+1 roads in states such as California, New Hampshire, Arkansas, and Missouri. The most prominent example is Interstate 93 in Franconia Notch State Park (before dropping down to a single lane in each direction, plus a steel divider). The mode is not unknown in the United States off Interstate roads, including for example California State Route 1 between Malibu and Oxnard, Arizona State Route 77 north of Oracle, U.S. Route 412 between Salem and Mountain Home, and the section of Missouri Route 5 between the towns of Lebanon and Camdenton. In the United States, this term is not used, and roads that would be in a configuration that could be described as 2+1 usually have an extra added climbing lane on steep grades for trucks and slow vehicles to climb or are dropping or expanding to two or four lanes respectively.

These roads also exist in Texas, called "Super 2", as that term has more than one definition.

In the 1950s, New York state built many highways that were three lanes wide, with traffic moving in either direction permitted to use the center lane for passing. After less than ten years of a frighteningly high head-on collision rate, all were re-striped into either two wide lanes, or a one-direction passing lane, or alternating between the two systems.

=== Elsewhere ===
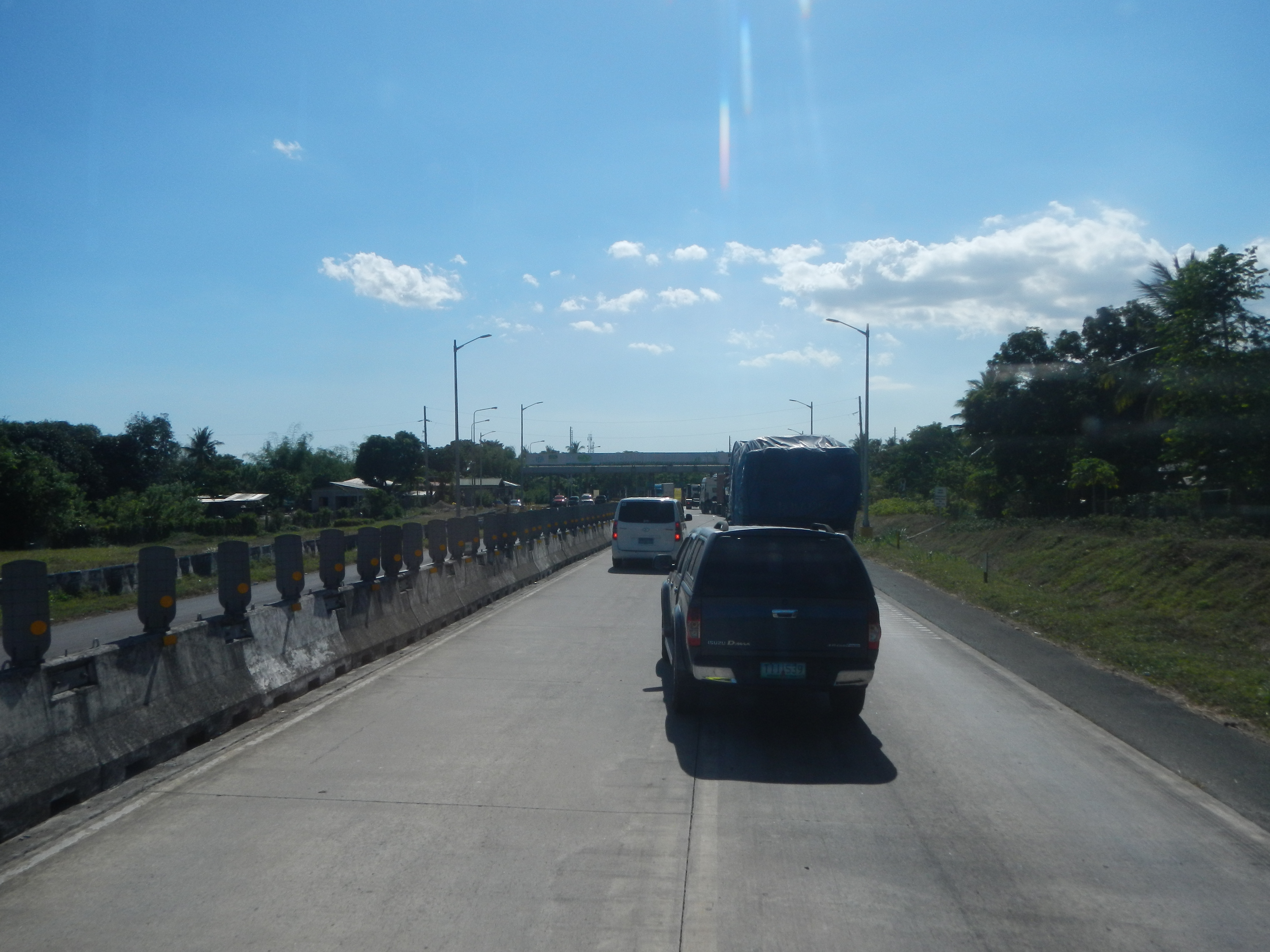
STAR Tollway in Batangas City, Philippines

Divided 2+1 roads are rare outside of Europe and the United States, though they are seen in a few places, such as Australia and the Canadian provinces of Ontario and Quebec. In Japan, a 2+1 road was implemented in the northern island of Hokkaido.

== See also ==
- Reversible lane
- Road diet
- Two-lane expressway
- Super 2
- 2-1 road
- Dual carriageway
