= Two-lane expressway =

Expressway or freeway with only one lane in each direction

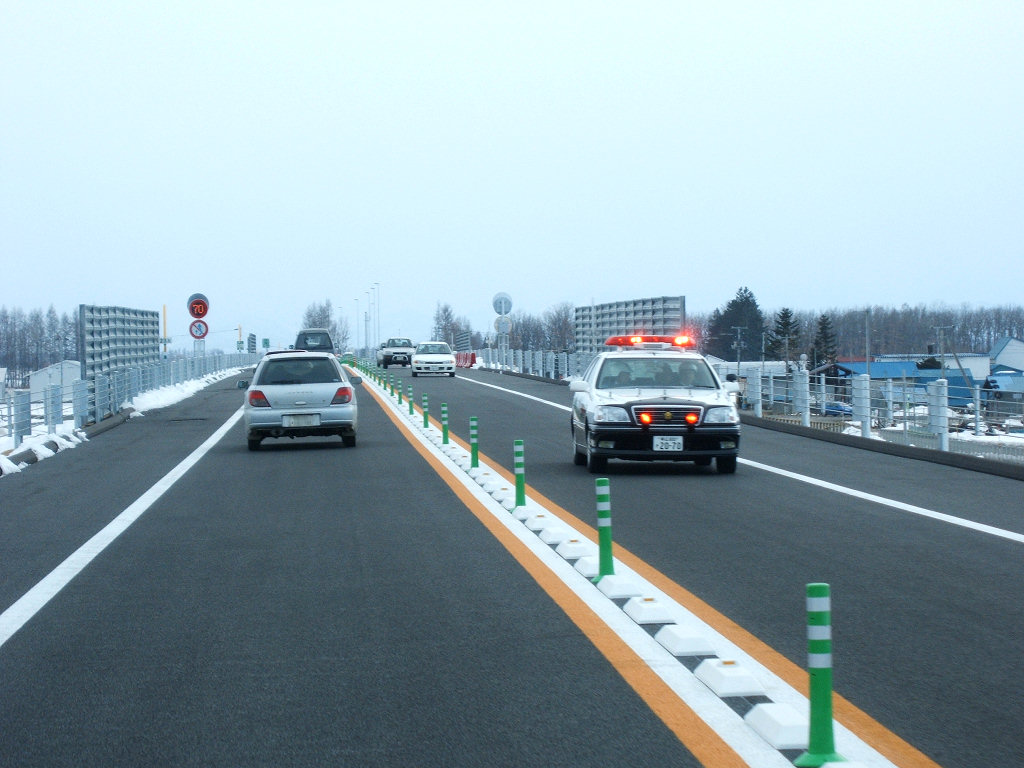
Two-lane expressway in Obihiro, Hokkaido, Japan

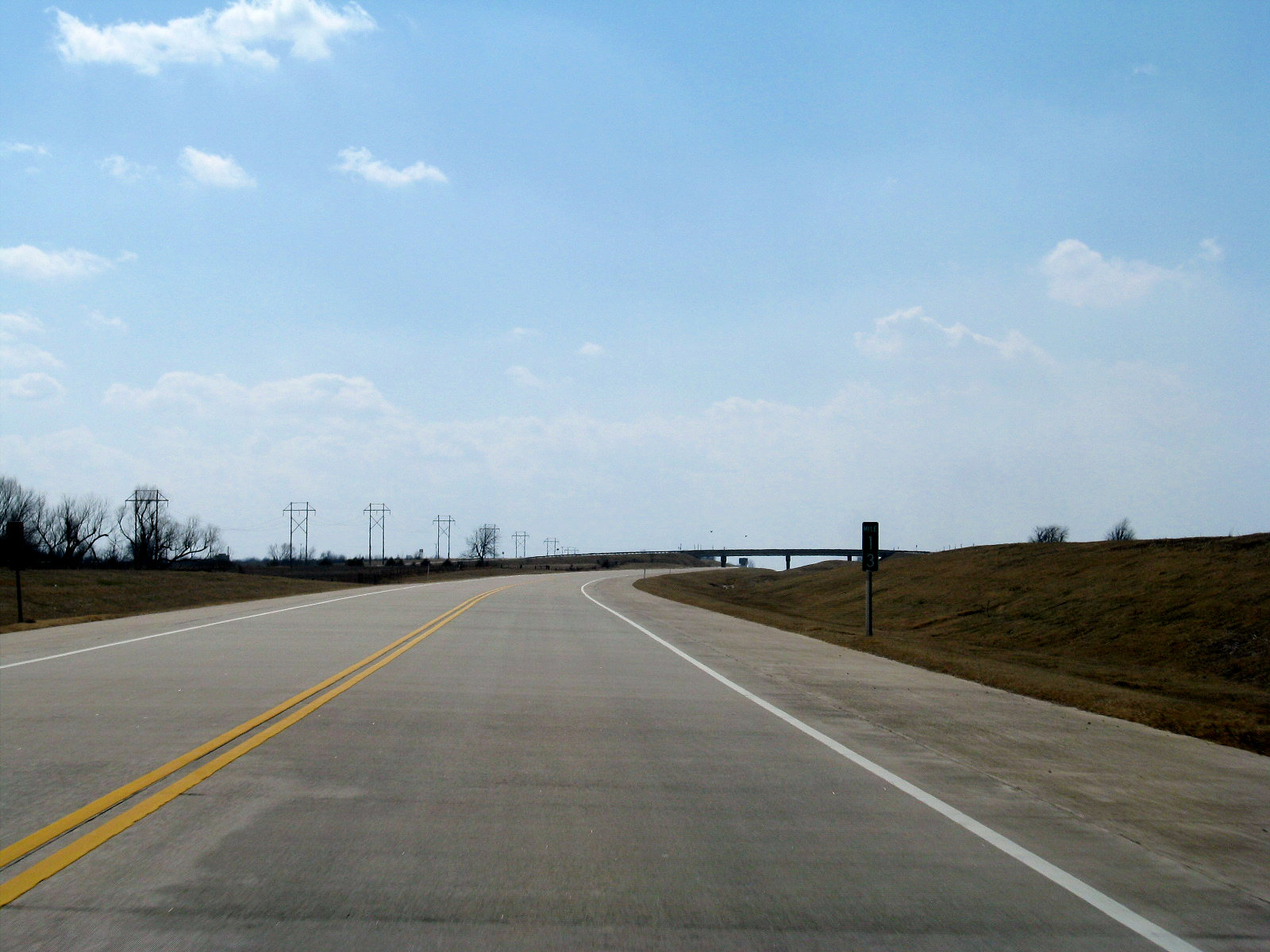
The Chickasaw Turnpike near Roff, Oklahoma, showing grade-separated overpass.

A two-lane expressway or two-lane freeway is an expressway or freeway with only one lane in each direction, and usually no median barrier. It may be built that way because of constraints, or may be intended for expansion once traffic volumes rise. The term super two is often used by roadgeeks for this type of road, but traffic engineers use that term for a high-quality surface road. Most of these roads are not tolled.

A somewhat related concept is a "four-lane undivided freeway". This is much rarer; a current example is U.S. Route 101 in California through Humboldt Redwoods State Park.

In Europe, the concept of express road encompasses roads which are classified between a motorway and an ordinary road. It does not necessarily have two lanes. This concept is recognized both by European Union law and under the UNECE treaty. This type of road is not very standardized, and its geometry may vary from country to country or within a same country. These roads are usually, but not always, limited-access roads. Some European Union regulation considers the high-quality roads to be roads "which play an important role in long-distance freight and passenger traffic, integrate the main urban and economic centres, interconnect with other transport modes and link mountainous, remote, landlocked and peripheral NUTS 2 regions to central regions of the Union". According to this same regulation "High-quality roads shall be specially designed and built for motor traffic, and shall be either motorways, express roads or conventional strategic roads." Eurostat and the United Nations Economic and Social Commission for Western Asia define an express road as a limited-access road that has signs reserving the roadway for specific categories of motor vehicles and that prohibits stopping and parking.

== Justification ==
Two-lane freeways are usually built as a temporary solution due to lack of funds, as an environmental compromise or as a way to overcome problems constrained from highway reconstruction when there are four lanes or more. If the road is widened, the existing road is typically allocated to traffic going in one direction, and the lanes for the other direction are built as a whole new roadbed adjacent to the existing one. When upgraded in this manner, the road becomes a typical freeway. Many two-lane freeways are built so that when the road is upgraded to a proper divided freeway, the existing overpasses and ramps do not need reconstruction.

== Super 2 ==
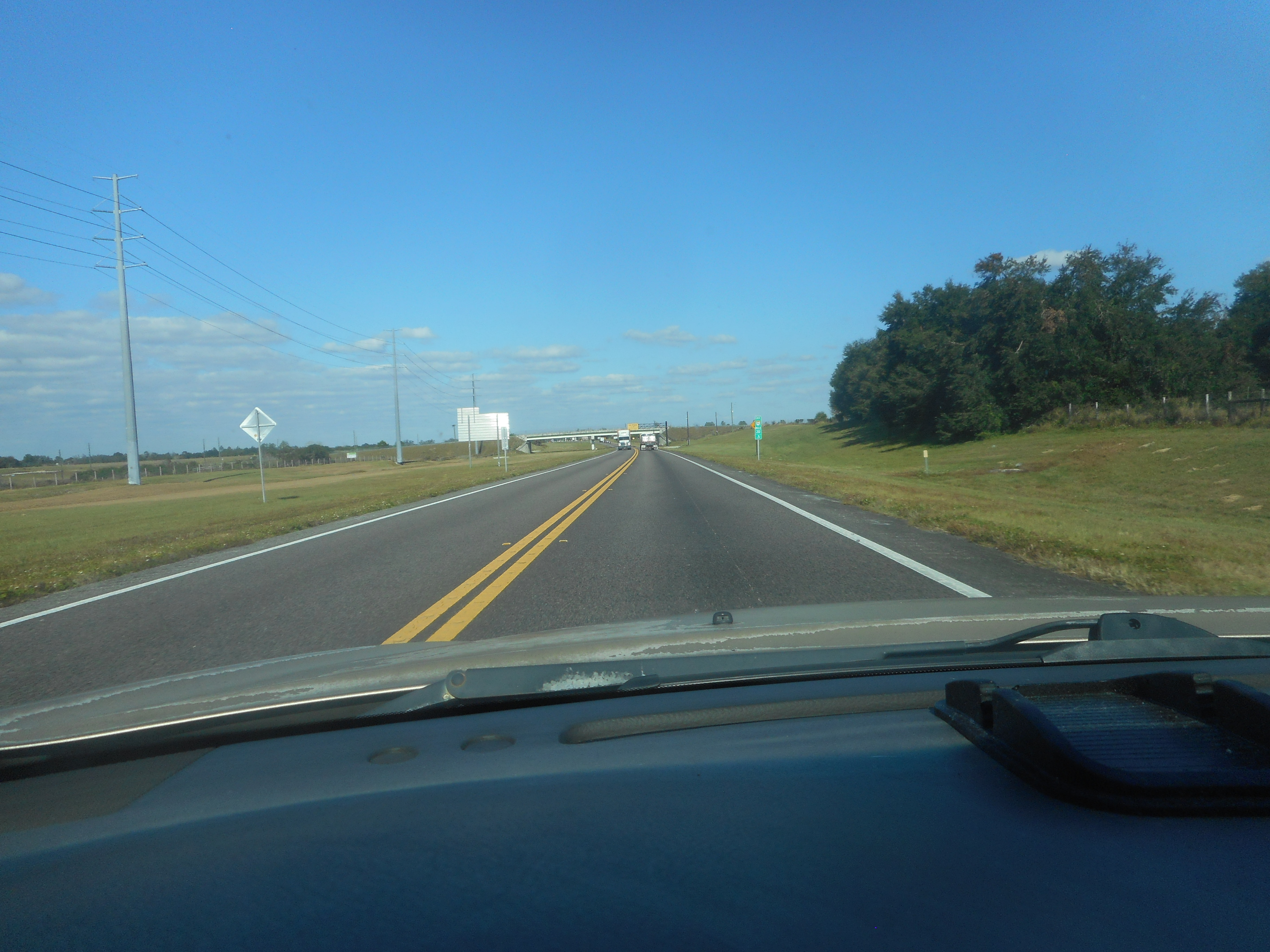
Part of the Polk Parkway in Florida is a Super 2

A super-2 expressway is a high-speed surface road with at-grade intersections, depending on the common usage of the term expressway in the area. By this definition, Super-2s can be considered the first stage of a project that is expected to become a full freeway, with the transportation authority owning the land necessary for the future adjacent carriageway. At-grade intersections exist but there is sufficient land to replace them with interchanges. In some US states, a super-2 expressway is simply referred to as a super-2, regardless of whether it is fully controlled-access or not. Highway 410 in Ontario was originally a super-2 before being upgraded to a full freeway. Similarly, most of Highway 102 in Nova Scotia was a super-2 for three decades before being upgraded. Many super-2 expressways are simply just short transitional segments between surface street and four-lane divided freeways.

=== Ireland ===
In the Republic of Ireland, the term wide two-lane is used by the National Roads Authority. In policy documents, the designation WS2 is used, which is also used in the UK for a wide single carriageway. Most wide two-lane roads are wide enough that a vehicle may overtake another without crossing the center line if the vehicle in front pulls into the hard shoulder (the carriageway including hard shoulders is 15–17 meters wide). Many future Irish road schemes will use 2+1 roads or 2+2 roads, as opposed to wide two-lane, which may better suit lower capacities than does 2+1.

=== Texas ===
In Texas, a two-lane highway that has an alternating passing lane is called a Super 2, but it is actually a 2+1 road. Chisholm Trail Parkway is a Super 2 located south of Fort Worth in the southern segment of the route, though there are future plans to extend the lanes to 2 lanes on each side.

=== Ontario ===
The Southwest Bypass of Sudbury, in the Province of Ontario is currently at Super 2 standards. There is one interchange and four at-grade, unsignalized intersections along an 11.3 km stretch of 2-lane highway; between being divided at interchanges on either end. While plans have existed since the 1967 "Planning Study for the Sudbury Southwest By-Pass", there is presently no funding in place to twin the bypass to a 4-lane expressway, nor a full freeway.

=== Nova Scotia ===
In the Province of Nova Scotia the parts of Highway 101, Highway 103, and Highway 104 that are not already four-lane, controlled access, highways employ a Super 2 configuration. As funding becomes available, the Super 2 portions of the highways are being twinned.

=== Quebec ===
In the Province of Quebec, part of Autoroute 50, between Buckingham and Lachute is built as a Super 2. As funding becomes available, the Super 2 portions of the highways are being twinned. In addition, Autoroute 55 south of Bécancour employs a Super 2 format.

== See also ==
- 2+1 road
