= Halblech (river) =

River in Germany

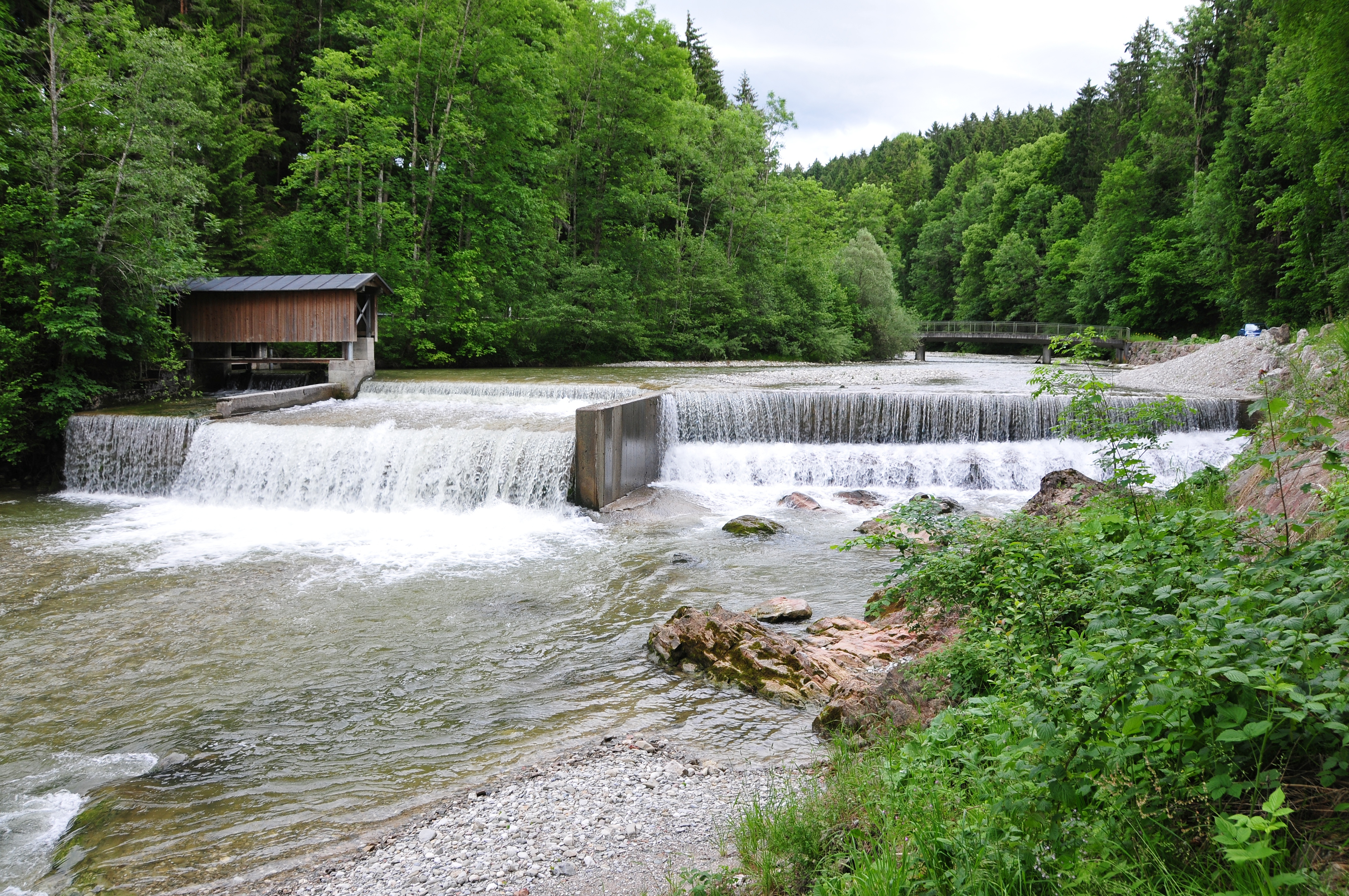
- Halblech, between Lechbruck and Halblech

Location
- Country: Germany
- State: Bavaria

Physical characteristics
- Mouth
  - location: Lech
  - coordinates: 47.6577°N 10.7830°E
- Length: 14.8 km (9.2 mi)

Basin features
- Progression: Lech→ Danube→ Black Sea

Halblech is a river of Bavaria, Germany. It flows into the Lech near Prem.

== See also ==
- List of rivers of Bavaria
