= B300 =

B300 may refer to:

- B-300, a reusable man-portable anti-tank weapon system developed by Israeli Military Industries in the late 1970s
- B300 model, original designation of the 350i Beechcraft Super King Air marketed as King Air 350
- Bundesstraße 300, a federal highway in Germany
- Midland Highway (Victoria), a highway in Victoria, Australia, that bears the designation B300 for part of its route
- Temple of Mut at Jebel Barkal in Sudan, also named temple B300
