= Augsburg-Hochzoll =

Coordinates: 48°21′10″N 10°56′50″E

Hochzoll (German: [hoːxˈtsɔl]) is one of the seventeen highest level civic divisions, or Planungsräume (planning district), of the city of Augsburg, Bavaria, Germany. It is located in the east of the city, and is bordered on its west by the Lech river, whose waters also feed the artificial Kuhsee (Cow lake) to the south of Hochzoll. To the east, Hochzoll shares its city border with a district of the town of Friedberg (Friedberg West). As of 31 December 2022 the population of Hochzoll was 20,872.

== History ==
The history of Hochzoll began with a bridging over the Lech river in 980. As the Lech is the historical border between Oberbayern (Upper Bavaria) and Schwaben (Swabia), and as the construction of bridges was very expensive at the time, a bridge toll was raised (HochZoll – High Tariff). Since the town charter for the Friedberg municipality in 1264, the Lech has also served as the border between Augsburg and Friedberg. Today's Hochzoll district then belonged to Friedberg and was referred to as Friedberger Au.

=== Timeline ===
The history of the district has always been strongly shaped by the construction of bridges.

- 1639 the Lech bridge goes up in flames as a result of war and can only be rebuilt through subsidies from the realm of the city of Augsburg.
- 1646 during the siege of Augsburg by French and Swedish armies, the bridge again goes up in flames.
- 1796 the destroyed bridge, by order of the French general Moreau, is rebuilt by carpenters from Augsburg.
- 1797 French troops burn the bridge down again, but in the two subsequent years reconstruction of the bridge takes place successfully.
- 1800 Bavarian military heavily damages the bridge – but with subsequent immediate repair – complete renewal of the bridge is accomplished a few years later. From 1803 onwards the Auen is increasingly settled east of the Lech.
- 1818 the scattered settlements comprise 24 estates. Hochzoll, Kolonie, Kolonie an der Lechbrücke and Einöden now comprehensively form the 172 inhabitant parish community of Friedbergerau.
- 1839/1840 building of a wooden course bridge as a part of the building of the railway line Augsburg – Munich.
- 1840 at the estate "Stierhof" the first Hochzoll railway station is built on the newly constructed railway line Augsburg – Munich.
- 1851 a flood destroys the road bridge.
- 1855 the city of Augsburg builds a new heavy timber bridge for road traffic.
- 1862 the wooden railway bridge is replaced by a latticed bridge made of steel.
- 1874 through construction of the Paartalbahn arises the station Hochzoll, the number of inhabitants increase, through immigration of industrial workers, to 350.
- 1877 establishment of a voluntary fire-brigade.
- 1878 the road bridge collapses, as floodwater wash away the columns from under the bridge and deposit them 50 meters up the Lech. An emergency bridge is constructed in its place.
- 1891 a road bridge made of iron replaces the emergency bridge which was established in 1878.
- 1905 the parish of Friedbergerau takes the name Hochzoll.
- 1910 a flood damages large parts of the village. The old weir on the Lech – called Hochablass (high drain) – was destroyed by the flood and reconstructed later.
- 1911 first electrical road lighting.
- 1913 incorporation: Together with Lechhausen the village of Hochzoll, whose population has increased in the meantime to 1708 inhabitants, becomes a district of Augsburg.
- 1915/1916 a new school building "Holzerau" is established.
- 1926 a new steel arch construction replaces the lattice bridge of the railway. This "new" bridge was still in use up to the year 2002.
- 1928 new building of a 120 meters long steel-reinforced concrete bridge, which was renovated in 1990.
- 1929 Hochzoll is attached to the town gas supply network.
- 1934 the Straßenbahn line 6 is built on the Friedberger road, over the Lech bridge, and up to Zugspitz street. (opened on 9 May 1934)
- 1944 several houses fall victim to allied bombs.
- 1945, 28 April, the US army rolls unhindered through Hochzoll towards Friedberg.
- 1946 war refugees find a new homeland in Hochzoll.
- 1954 there are now over 5.000 inhabitants.
- 1957 laying of the foundation stone of the European village.
- 1969 Hochzoll is divided into north and south.
- Starting from 1970 the settlement of Hochzoll begins, with the establishment of housing estates south of Oberländer street, to push against its boundaries.
- 1972 the Eiskanal (a canoe racing channel running parallel to the Lech) is built as part of the 1972 Summer Olympic games held in Munich. As part of the construction measures of the Eiskanal, the Kuhsee is built in the popular local recreation area in the south of Hochzoll. Also in this year the fifth to eighth level auxiliary classes, which were previously provided at the Holbein-Gymnasium (specialising in the natural sciences and languages), were shifted to the now finished Rudolf Diesel Gymnasium. At present over 1.150 pupils visit this Gymnasium (High School).
- 1976 16 September, the Rudolf Diesel Gymnasium at Friedberger street takes up its training enterprise.
- 1990 reconstruction of the road bridge
- 2000–2003 the 1926 built railway bridge, in the course of the four track development of the Augsburg – Munich line, is replaced by two new steel arch bridges.

== Road and rail links ==
The main road through Augsburg Hochzoll is the Bundesstrasse 300, also designated as the Bundesstrasse 2 for the section which goes through Hochzoll. The latter turns to the south in the east of Hochzoll, and forms part of the border between Hochzoll and Friedberg West.

Approximately 200 meters south of the road bridge, a bridge on the Augsburg-Munich railway line also crosses the Lech. East of the railway bridge is the Hochzoll station, at which the Paartalbahn railway line branches off the main route to Ingolstadt. This light-rail route runs roughly parallel to the B 300, while the main route of the Augsburg–Munich line turns south towards Munich.
