= Augsburg-Firnhaberau =

German city district

Coordinates: 48.406°N 10.894°E

Firnhaberau is the 28th Stadtbezirk, or city district, of Augsburg, Bavaria, Germany. It currently makes up the entire 4th Planungsraum, or planning district, of Augsburg. The district has a population of approximately 5,500 and an area of 7.42 km^{2} (2.86 sq mi).

== Location ==
Firnhaberau is the northernmost district of Augsburg, and is bordered on the east by Hammerschmiede, the fifth Planungsraum of Augsburg, in the south by Lechhausen, the 6th Planungsraum, and in the north by the municipal boundary of Augsburg and the Bundesautobahn 8.

== History ==
Firnhaberau is named after wealthy industrialist Friedrich August Firnhaber, who died in 1887. Firnhaber was one of the proprietors of Augburg's largest textile factories, the Augsburger Kammgarn-Spinnerei. The land, considered to be a floodplain, was acquired by the forest administration of Augsburg, which offered the land to Lechhausen, which refused, considering the assessed price to be too high. When Firnhaber's widow died in 1904, the land passed as an endowment to the city of Augsburg, which put it in trust in case of a housing emergency in the future.

Firnhaberau was officially installed as a division of Augsburg on July 15, 1920, at 9:00 AM. The land was not immediately usable, and the work of clearing the land and preparing it for settlement did not begin until January 30, 1921. On February 6 of the same year, a wooden military barracks was constructed in the Hubertusplatz, the main public area of the new division. On March 13, 1921, groundbreaking for the first new residences took place on the Siedlerweg (Settler Way). These residences were completed on May 15, and on July 1, 1921, nearly one year after the incorporation of the district, the first settlers began to occupy Firnhaberau. In 1927 a school was constructed in the Hubertusplatz, which still stands today and contains four grade levels. Between 1928 and 1929, a Catholic church honoring Saint Francis of Assisi was built. In 1934, a portion of eastern Firnhaberau was transferred to Hammerschmiede. The population was 1,900 in 1939, 1,800 in 1946, and 4,345 in 1976.
