= Bundesstraße 300 =

Federal highway in Germany

B 300
- Bundesstraße 300
- B300 in red.

Route information
- Length: 169 km (105 mi)

Major junctions
- North-East end: Buxtehude
- South-West end: Regensburg

Location
- Country: Germany
- States: Bavaria

Highway system
- Roads in Germany; Autobahns; List; Federal; List; State; E-roads

The Bundesstraße 300 or B 300 is one of the German federal highways crossing southern Bavaria from Memmingen in direction to Regensburg via Krumbach (Swabia), Augsburg und Aichach.

In Augsburg the B 300 and the B2 respectively the B17 run short distances on the same roads. In Augsburg, Neusäß, Stadtbergen and near the Bundesautobahn 8 the B 300 has two lanes of traffic in each direction (dual carriageway). In the valley of the river Paar most parts of the road has in all three lanes of traffic (2+1 road).

The part of the B 300 between Dasing and Aichach was part of the planned but not constructed Bundesautobahn 90. It is planned that this section of the B 300 will be constructed like a Bundesautobahn with two lanes of traffic in each direction from the year 2010 on.

== Junction lists ==
Legend:

- I/C - Interchange, I/S - Intersection, RSA - Rest and service area, OBR - Overhead bridge restaurant, R/R - Restaurant and rest plaza, L/B - Layby, V/P - Vista point, TN - tunnel, T/P - Toll plaza, BR - Bridge
- C - Cloverleaf, S - Stack, T-A - Trumpet-A, T-B - Trumpet-B, DT - Directional-T/Y, SDT - Semi-Directional-T/Y, P-Y - Partial-Y, D - Diamond, P-C - Partial cloverleaf, D-D - Diverging diamond, D-R - Direct ramp

	Münchsmünster B 16 B 16a
	Aiglsbach-Moosham
	Geisenfeld-Schafshof/Strassberg
	Geisenfeld-Lindach
	Geisenfeld-Engelbrechtsmünster/Schwillwitzried
	Gaden bei Geisenfeld
	Geisenfeld
	Reichertshofen-Dörfl / Reichertshofen-Hög
(64)	Langenbruck A 9
	Reichertshofen-Langenbruck
	Reichertshofen-Winden am Aign
	Reichertshofen-Gotteshofen B 13
	Freinhausen B 13
	Pörnbach-Oberkreut
RSA	parking area
	Hohenwart-Weichenried
	Englmannszell
	Eulenried / Marxmühle
	Hohenwart-Ost
	Hohenwart-Süd
	Waidhofen-Nord
	Waidhofen
	Waidhofen-Ost
	Schrobenhausen-Mühlried
	Schrobenhausen
	Schrobenhausen-Industriegebiet
	Gachenbach-Peutenhausen
	Gachenbach
RSA	parking area
	Kühbach-Nord
	Kühbach-Süd
	Unterwittelsbach
	Aichach-Untergriesbach
	Aichach-West
	Aichach-Süd
	Obergriesbach / Aichach-Gallenbach
	Ippertshausen
(74)	Dasing A 8
	Dasing-Ost
	Dasing-West
	Dasing-Süd
	Dasing-Oberzell
	Friedberg-Ottoried
	Friedberg
	Augsburg B 2 B 17
	Stadtbergen
	Stadtbergen-Deuringen / Neusäß-Steppach
	Neusäß-Vogelsang B 10
	Diedorf
	Gessertshausen
	Ustersbach
	Dinkelscherben-Ried / D.-Breitenbronn
	Ziemetshausen-Schönbach
	Ziemetshausen
	Thannhausen
	Ursberg
	Krumbach-Edenhausen
	Krumbach B 16
	Ebershausen
	Kettershausen / Kettershausen-Bebenhausen
	Babenhausen
	Winterrieden
	Boos
	Niederrieden
	Heimertingen B 312
	Memmingen
(129)	Memmingen-Süd A 7
