= List of civic divisions of Augsburg =

Map of civic divisions in Augsburg, showing both Planungsräume and Stadtbezirke.

This is a list of civic divisions of Augsburg, Bavaria, Germany. Augsburg is divided into two tiers of such divisions. The highest level division is called a Planungsraum, (Plural: Planungsräume, English: planning district) while the lower tier are called Stadtbezirke (Singular: Stadtbezirk, English: wards). Some Planungsräume contain only one Stadtbezirk, with which such a planning district is coterminous; other districts consist of multiple Stadtbezirke. Currently, Augsburg contains 17 Planungsräume and 42 Stadtbezirke. Population statistics are current as of January 1, 2006.

I Innenstadt	41,505	IX Hochfeld	8,688
1 Lechviertel, östl. Ulrichsviertel	4,115	13 Hochfeld	8,688
2 Innenstadt, St. Ulrich - Dom	2,440	X Antonsviertel	5,916
3 Bahnhofs-, Bismarckviertel	6,127	14 Antonsviertel	5,916
4 Georgs- u. Kreuzviertel	3,597	XI Spickel–Herrenbach	12,786
5 Stadtjägerviertel	3,437	11 Spickel	2,625
7 Bleich und Pfärrle	3,993	30 Wolfram- u. Herrenbachviertel	10,161
8 Jakobervorstadt - Nord	6,866	XII Hochzoll	20,503
9 Jakobervorstadt - Süd	3,464	24 Hochzoll-Nord	9,462
10 Am Schäfflerbach	7,466	31 Hochzoll-Süd	11,041
II Oberhausen	23,913	XIII Haunstetten-Siebenbrunn	26,755
6 Rechts der Wertach	4,048	12 Siebenbrunn	103
19 Links der Wertach-Süd	3,467	33 Haunstetten-Nord	7,025
20 Links der Wertach-Nord	2,939	34 Haunstetten-West	7,652
21 Oberhausen-Süd	6,975	35 Haunstetten-Ost	5,178
22 Oberhausen-Nord	6,484	36 Haunstetten-Süd	6,797
III Bärenkeller	7,452	XIV Göggingen	18,149
23 Bärenkeller	7,452	37 Göggingen-Nordwest	4,707
IV Firnhaberau	5,566	38 Göggingen-Nordost	7,203
28 Firnhaberau	5,566	40 Göggingen-Süd	6,239
V Hammerschmiede	6,632	XV Inningen	4,789
29 Hammerschmiede	6,632	41 Inningen	4,789
VI Lechhausen	33,407	XVI Bergheim	2,692
25 Lechhausen-Süd	7,689	42 Bergheim	2,692
26 Lechhausen-Ost	12,600	XVII Universitätsviertel	11,239
27 Lechhausen-West	13,116	32 Universitätsviertel	11,239
VII Kriegshaber	16,401
18 Kriegshaber	16,401
VIII Pfersee	23,058
15 Rosenau- u. Thelottviertel	3,022
16 Pfersee-Süd	10,873
17 Pfersee-Nord	9,163
