= Augsburg-Inningen =

District in Bavaria, Germany

Coordinates: 48.314°N 10.858°E

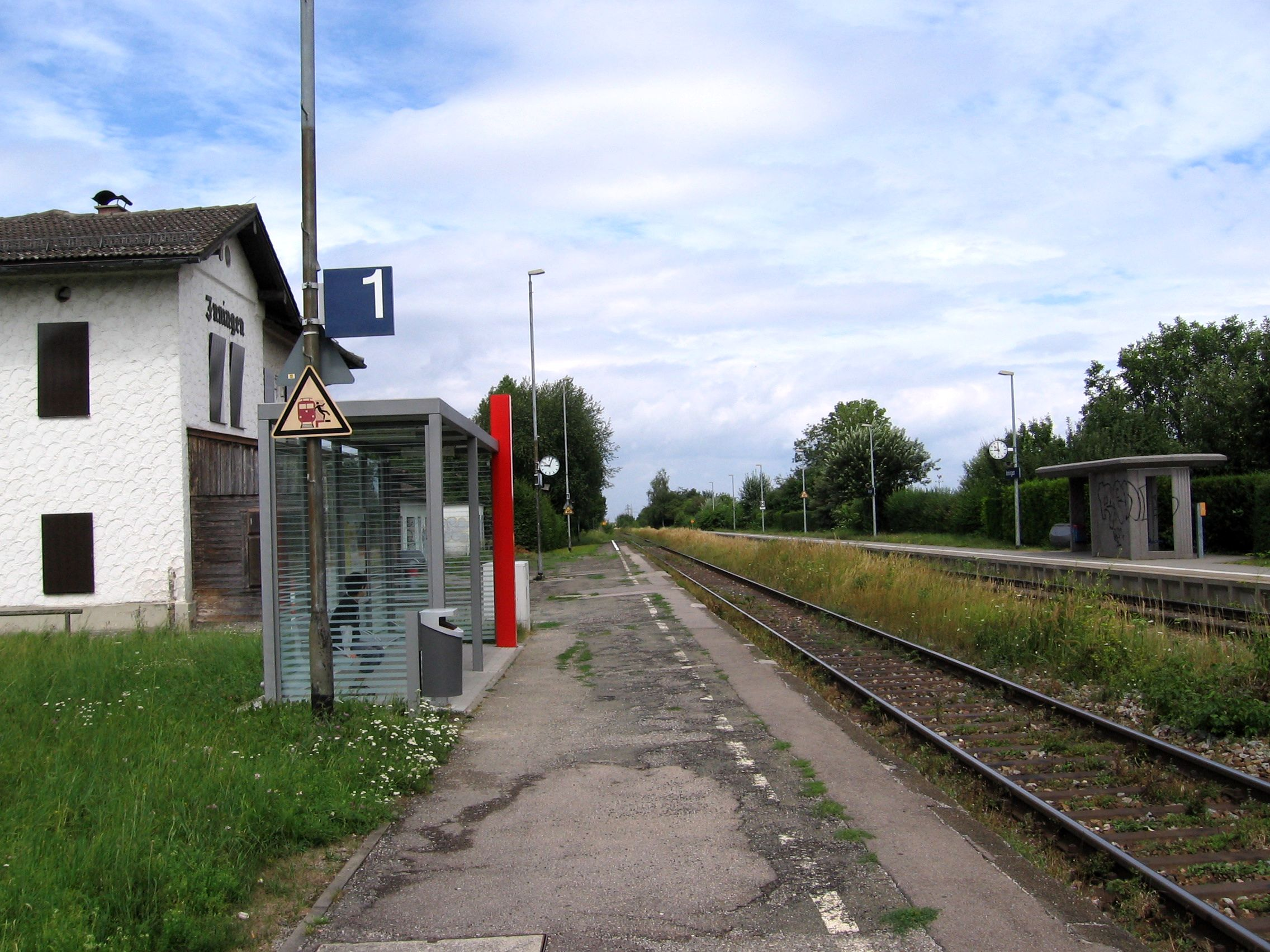
The Augsburg-Inningen train station.

Inningen (German pronunciation: [ˈɪnɪŋən]) is one of the 17 Planungsräume (English: Planning District) of Augsburg, Bavaria, Germany. It consists solely of the 41st Stadtbezirk (English: Ward or City Ward), with which it shares a name and is coterminous. As of January 1, 2006, Inningen was reported to have a population 4,735, and an area of 13.42 km^{2} (5.18 km^{2}). Its population density is 352.8 persons per square kilometer (914 persons/sq mi). It was previously its own municipality before being annexed to Augsburg in 1972.

== History ==
Although supposedly founded by the Allemanni tribes in the year 506, the town was first mentioned in a historical context in 1071. At that time the town had already been settled by local inhabitants and a Roman road. connecting Augsburg with Kempten im Allgäu, ran through the town. The town also has a large millstone also dating from Roman times. The largest landmark in the area, the Church of Saints Peter and Paul was built in 1713. Up until the Second World War, Inningen was a small farming community on the outskirts of Augsburg, although since then it has developed into a more heavily populated residential area of Augsburg. The city lost its status as an independent municipality in 1972. Inningen was, for one day, annexed to Augsburg attached with the neighboring town, Bergheim in order to qualify for a bus depot, and other such amenities, but this was against nearly every local law and was quickly overturned. Inningen and Bergheim are today separate Planungsräume.

== Transportation ==
Inningen has its own train station, which is regularly served by two local train routes, the R7 and the R8. It is served by the regional bus lines numbers 700 and 721, as well as the Augsburg Bus Route 38. It is connected to downtown Augsburg with Augsburg Bus Route 90, which only runs at night. Bundesstraße 17, which is built to Autobahn road standards, is only 2 km (1.2 km) from Inningen, and has one of its exits signed as "Augsburg-Inningen/Augsburg-Haunstetten."
