= Inner city (disambiguation) =

Inner cities are residential areas in the central area of a major city.

Inner City may refer to:

== Places ==
- Inner City (Baku), the ancient historical core of Baku, Azerbaijan
- Inner City (Budapest), the historical old town of Pest, now part of Budapest, Hungary
- Inner City, Johannesburg, South Africa
- Inner City (nomination district), a nominating district in Denmark

== Other uses ==
- Inner City (band), an American electronic group of the 1980s
- Inner City Broadcasting Corporation, an American media company
- Inner City (1995 film), a French film
- Inner City (2011 film), a Canadian animated short film
- Inner City, working title for 2018 film Roman J. Israel, Esq.
- Inner City Press, a non-profit organization based in the South Bronx, New York, founded by Matthew Lee (lawyer)
- Inner City Records, American jazz record label
- Inner City (role-playing game), a 1982 role-playing game
