= Augsburg-Hammerschmiede =

Planning district in Bavaria, Germany

Coordinates: 48.400°N 10.911°E

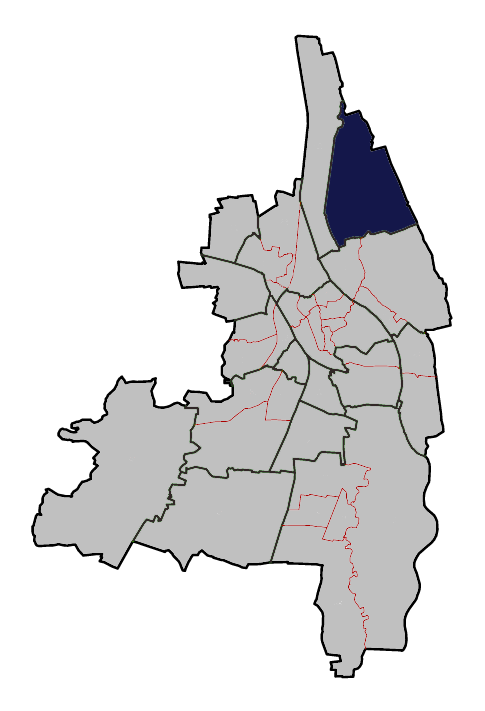

Hammerschmiede (German pronunciation: [ˈhamɐʃmiːdə]) is one of the seventeen (17th) highest-level civic divisions, or planning districts, (German: Planungsräume) of Augsburg, Bavaria, Germany. As of January 1, 2006, it is estimated to have a population of 6,574. It is coterminous with the identically named 29th ward, or Stadtbezirk, and has an area of 9.21 km^{2} (3.56 mi^{2}).

== Location ==
Hammerschmiede is bordered on the west by Firnhaberau, in the south by the wards of Lechhausen East and Lechhausen West, part of the Lechhausen planning district. Hammerschmiede's northern and eastern borders are the city limits of Augsburg.

== History ==
In 1821, in the northeast of what is the present-day neighborhood of Hammerschmiede am Mühlbach, a water-powered forge which produced iron products was constructed, giving the future planning district its name. The German word for "forge" is "Schmiede". This forge no longer exists, although it functioned as a steam forge until 1944. The river upon which the steam forge sat no longer exists; when the riverbed of the River Lech was excavated, the water level of the Mühlbach, where the forge was located, sank dramatically. Today, the only sign that a river even existed in that location are a few small bridges which cross the now dry riverbed.

The planning district was officially formed in 1934, from the eastern part of the Firnhaberau district as well as newly cleared forest lands purchased by the city from beyond its limits. The land was developed, and the district now contains a Grundschule, a primary school and a Teilschule, which together cover the first six years of the German educational system. The district also contains a Waldorf school with an attached kindergarten, as well as two traditional kindergartens. The district also contains several playgrounds as well as a playground specially designed for older children. Varied shopping opportunities exist in the district, including banks and service industries. The 1934-built and 1964 expanded Catholic Christkönig (English: Christ the King) church is located in the district, on the Pappelweg. An evangelical church, Saint Lucas, is located on the border between Hammerschmiede and Firnhaberau.

== Transportation ==
The northern portion of the planning district is traversed by the Bundesautobahn 8, while the southern and eastern portions of the district contain the four spurs of the Bundesstraße 2. North of the Bundesautobahn there is a purposely undeveloped plot of land (German: Naherholungsgebiet) which is accessible by a pedestrian and bicycle only bridge. This area is named Autobahnsee, which translates to "highway lake" or "highway sea."

In terms of public transportation, Hammerschmiede is connected to the city center via Augsburg bus route 23. Travel time to the city center by bus is approximately twenty minutes.
