= Augsburg-Innenstadt =

Coordinates: 48°22′00″N 10°54′00″E

Innenstadt (German pronunciation: [ˈɪnənˌʃtat], lit. 'Inner City') is one of the seventeen highest level civic divisions, or Planungsräume (planning district), of the city of Augsburg, Bavaria, Germany. Located in the centre of the city, it is the most populated planning district, home to 49,222 residents as of December 31, 2022.

== Location ==
Innenstadt is bordered on the west by Pfersee, the north by Oberhausen, to the east by the Lech river (bordering Lechhausen and Hochzoll), and to the south by Spickel–Herrenbach, Hochfeld and Antonsviertel.

== Landmarks ==
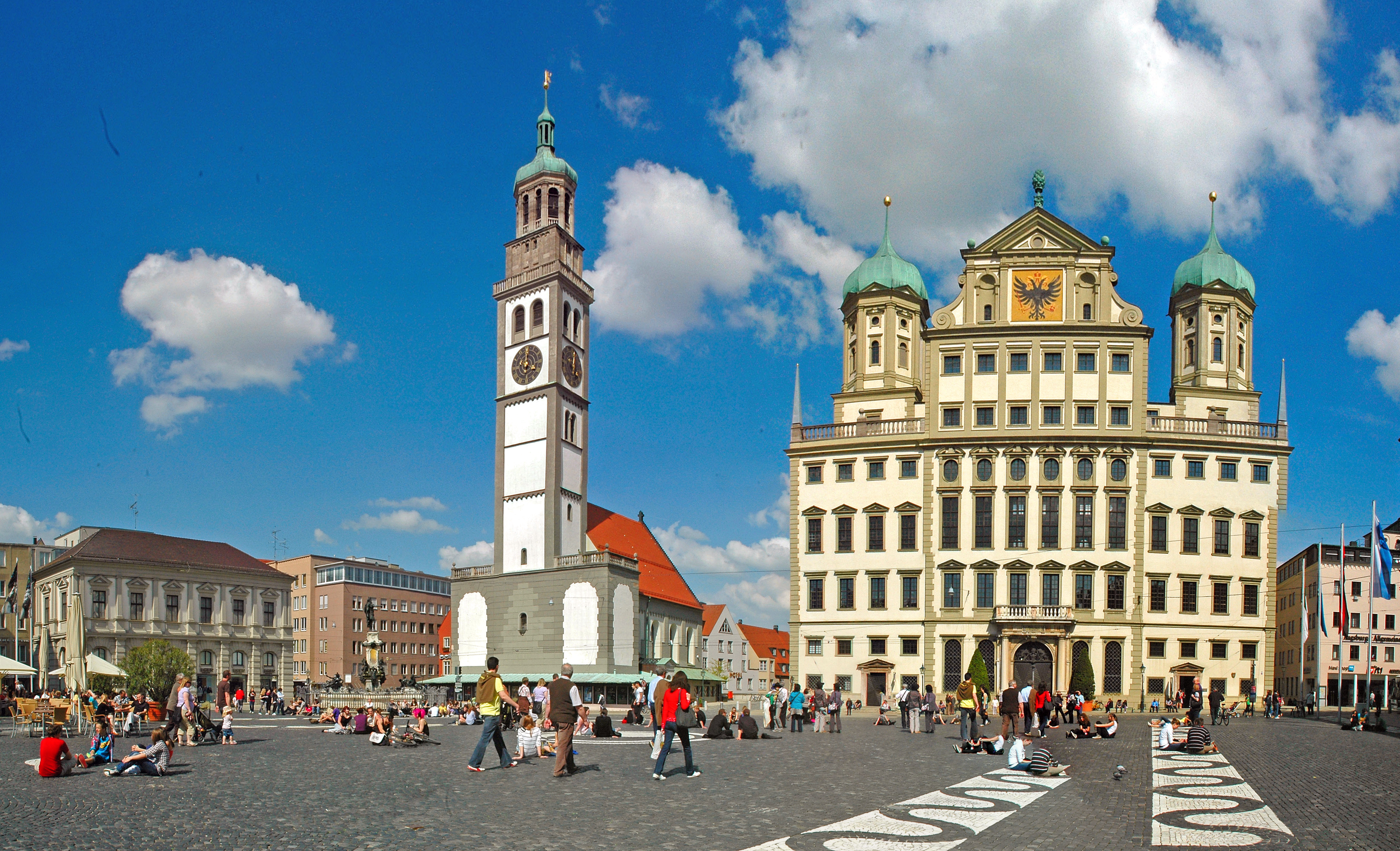
Rathausplatz (Town hall square) with the Rathaus, as it stands by the Perlachturm.

The historic city center of Augsburg, the old town within the city fortifications, is located in Innenstadt. The 17th-century Augsburg Town Hall (German: Augsburger Rathaus) is situated here.
