= 2−1 road =

Road with extra wide shoulders, and a smaller two-way lane in the middle for vehicles

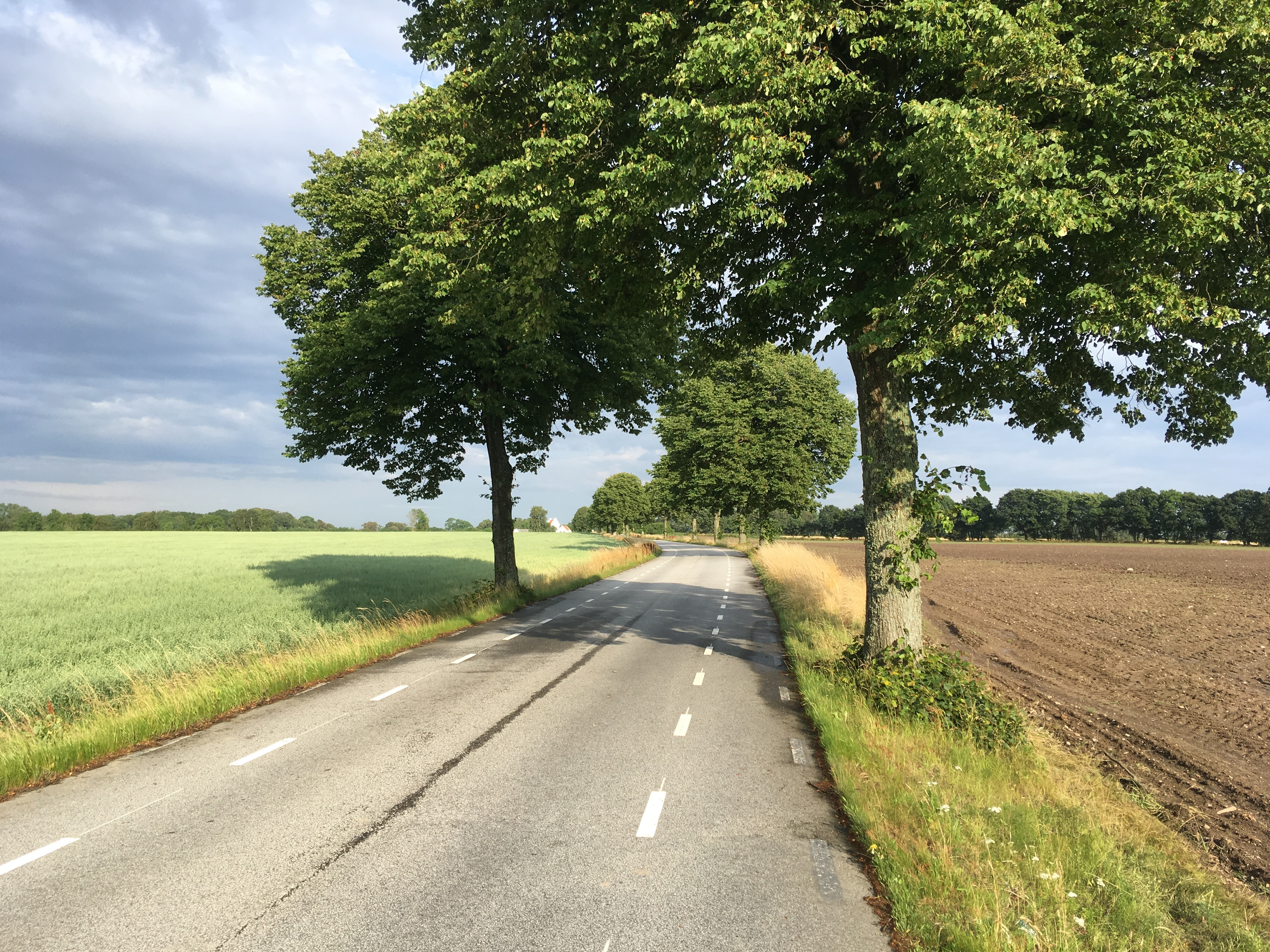
A rural 2-1 road in Allerum, Sweden.

Scheme of a 2-1 road.

A 2−1 road (2-minus-1 road) is a type of road with extra wide shoulders, and a narrower single two-way lane in the middle for motor vehicles. The shoulders are to be used by pedestrians and cyclists, and if necessary by meeting vehicles. The purpose of the road is to give more space to pedestrians and cyclists and thereby avoid constructing new dedicated pedestrian and bicycle paths, especially in areas where new constructions are to be avoided or not possible.

The road-type is popular in Denmark where a third of all municipalities have at least one stretch of this type of road. Together with other traffic calming measures these roads have lowered traffic accidents by about 25%. Sweden started building this type of road in 2006; there it is called "bymiljöväg", or in English "village environment road", as it often goes through and between different dispersed settlements. There the roads have been met by criticism from both residents and the police as they believe it will lead to more accidents. Drivers' behavior has also been criticized.

Switzerland has a similar concept, called Kernfahrbahn in German.

== See also ==
- 2+1 road
- Road diet
- Reversible lane
