= 2+2 road =

Design of road

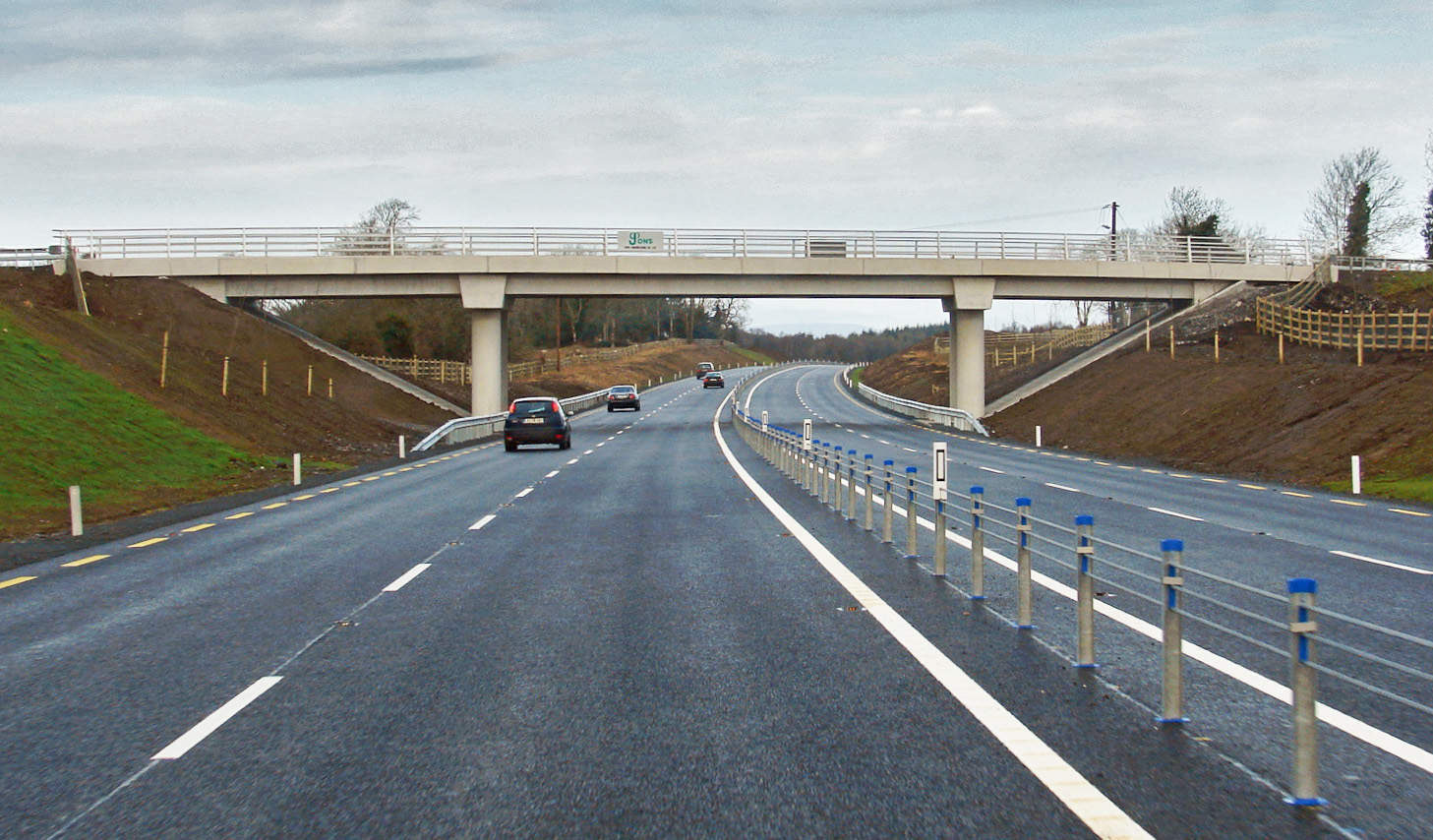
An example of a 2+2 dual-carriageway in Ireland (the N4)

A 2+2 road is a specific type of dual-carriageway that exists primarily in Ireland, Sweden, Estonia and Finland, consisting of two lanes in each direction separated by a steel cable barrier.

These roads do not have hard shoulders and therefore cannot be designated as motorways in the future. However, they may be designated as limited-access roads, as such roads do not require the physical standard of motorways to be designated as expressways. The Irish variant has 3.5-metre-wide (11 ft) lanes where there are a number of Swedish variants some with 3.25-metre-wide (10.7 ft) lanes.

Junctions are generally at-grade roundabouts and minor roads cross under or over the mainline without connecting. They are also known as "type 2 dual-carriageways" by the Irish National Roads Authority. These roads look similar to expressways, except that expressways often have interchanges, large medians or concrete barriers between traffic.

2+2 roads are commonly found in the outskirts of Jamaica.

== History ==
=== First Irish 2+2 ===
In Ireland first purpose-built road of this type opened in December 2007 as a new greenfield section of the N4 national primary route which joins Dublin to Sligo.

== See also ==
- 2+1 road
- Limited-access road
