= Augsburg-Oberhausen =

Coordinates: 48.392°N 10.878°E

Oberhausen (German pronunciation: [ˈoːbɐhaʊzn̩]; Swabian: Oberhause) is one of the seventeen Planungsräume (English: Planning district, singular Planungsraum) of the city of Augsburg, Bavaria, Germany. Located in the northern portion of the city, it is home to 29,044 residents as of December 31, 2022, making it one of the larger planning districts in terms of population. Contained within Oberhausen are five Stadtbezirke (English: ward, singular Stadtbezirk.) The second largest river in Augsburg, the Wertach, flows through Oberhausen.

== Location ==
Oberhausen is bordered on the east by the Lech, the largest river in Augsburg. Oberhausen is bordered on the west by the Bärenkeller and Kriegshaber Planning districts. The district's northern border is the municipal limit of Augsburg, and the southern border is with the Innenstadt planning district, and the two are separated by a railway line.

== Characterization ==
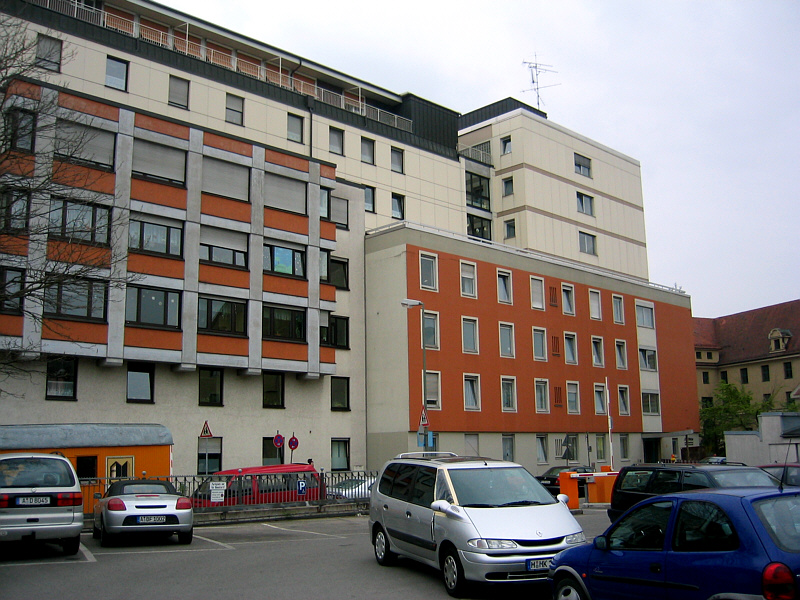
The Josefinum children's hospital in 2003.

Oberhausen is a multicultural district which has the highest proportion of residents of foreign origin in Augsburg. Due to the high number of immigrant and foreign residents and their families, Oberhausen has a very low median age compared to other sections of Augsburg. In the southern portion of Oberhausen along the right bank of the Wertach River is a large Assyrian community, whereas the largest concentration of Turkish residents is found along the river's left bank. The northern portion of Oberhausen is the location of Augsburg's Russian community. Oberhausen has combined these foreign influences and retains an air of a smaller city. Other portions of Oberhausen are characterized by a stark difference between types of development even over very small distances. However, the Josefinum, built in 1902, is one of Germany's largest children's hospitals.

Due to its multicultural nature, Oberhausen is home to many cultural associations, such as the German-Thai peoples' society, the Chinese-German association, and others. As is normal with such areas of cities, Oberhausen is home to its own sport clubs, however, many of these clubs are ethnically themed.

== Transportation ==
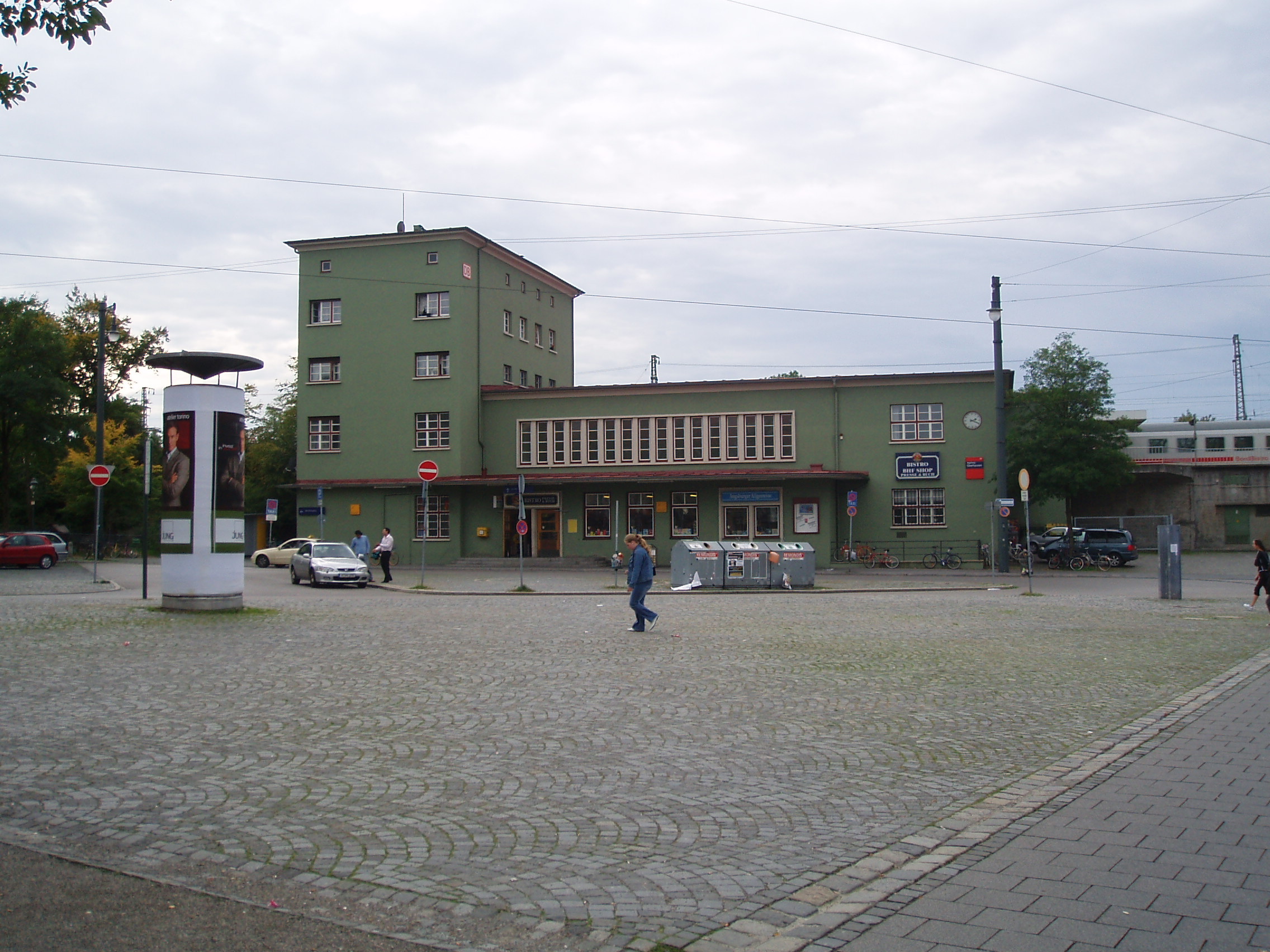
The Oberhausen train station.

Donauwörther Street is Oberhausen's main north-south oriented street, whereas Ulmer Street is the main east-west route. Oberhausen has its own train station, and most trains which approach Augsburg from the north or west will stop in Oberhausen. Oberhausen is connected to the downtown area with two tram lines, the numbers 2 and 4.
