= Halblech =

- Municipality
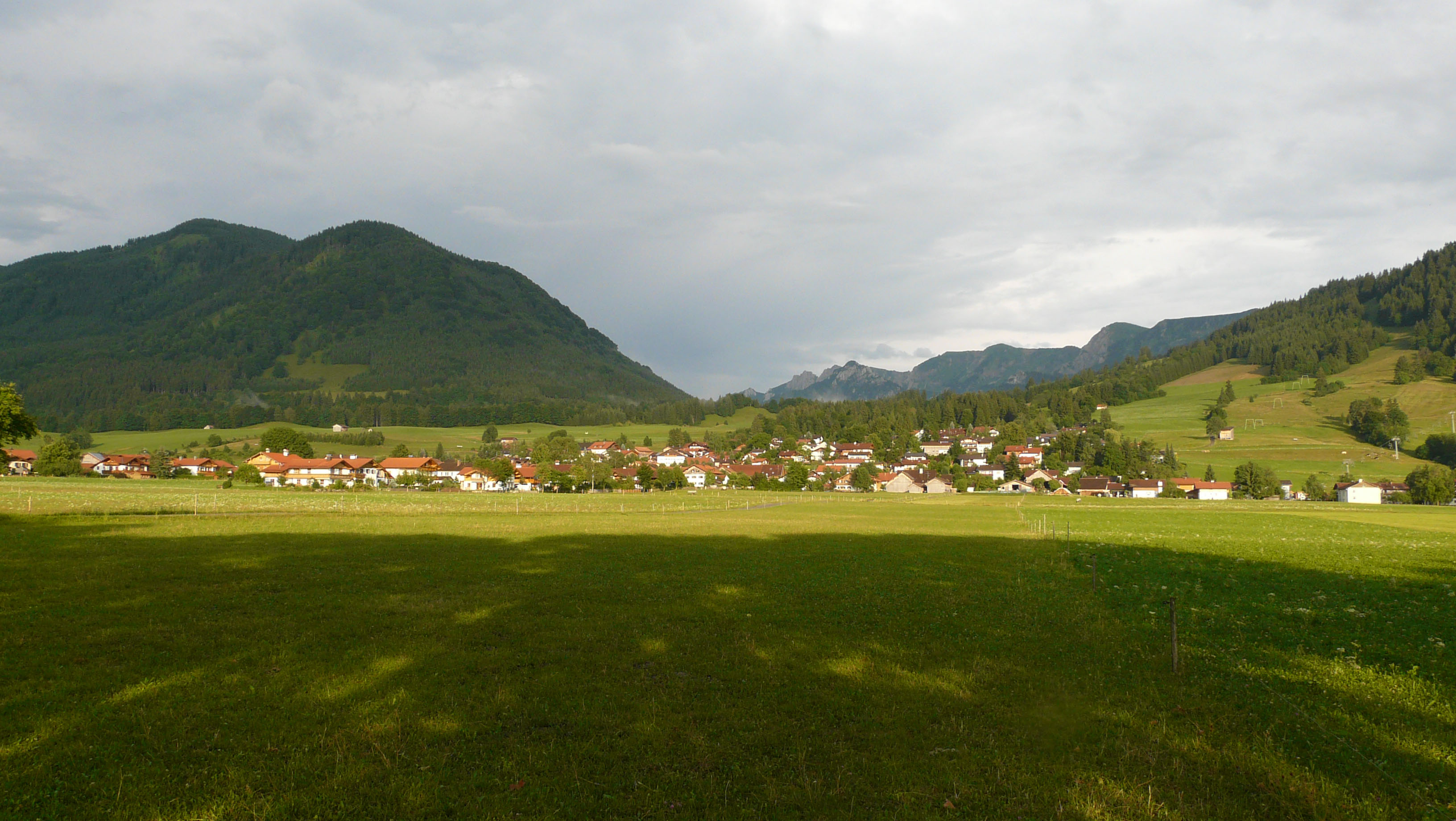
- View towards the municipal part of Buching

- Coat of arms

- Location of Halblech within Ostallgäu district
- Interactive map of Halblech
- Location within Germany Location within Bavaria
- Coordinates: 47°38′N 10°49′E
- Country: Germany
- State: Bavaria
- Admin. region: Schwaben
- District: Ostallgäu

Government
  - Mayor (2020–26): Johann Gschwill

Area
  - Total: 125.50 km^{2} (48.46 sq mi)
- Elevation: 800–2,082 m (2,625–6,831 ft)

Population (2025-12-31)
  - Total: 3,376
  - Density: 26.90/km^{2} (69.67/sq mi)
- Time zone: UTC+01:00 (CET)
  - Summer (DST): UTC+02:00 (CEST)
- Postal codes: 87642
- Dialling codes: 08368
- Vehicle registration: OAL
- Website: www.halblech.de

Halblech is a municipality in the district of Ostallgäu in Bavaria in Germany. It is named after the nearby Halblech River.

In 1976, the former municipalities of Buching and Trauchgau were merged into Halblech.

== Notable people ==
- Monika Bader, German alpine skier
