= Inner City (role-playing game) =

Tabletop role-playing game

Inner City is a role-playing game published by Inner City Games Designs in 1982.

== Description ==
Inner City is a contemporary crime system with humorous overtones. The PCs are Citizens or Crooks; character subclasses include cops, politicians, vigilantes, FBI agents, and hoods; most of these subclasses may be either Crooks or Citizens. The object is to get ahead and make more money. Skills are increased directly through experience gained in encounters. The system contains numerous charts and tables (for encounters, "treasure," etc.), but few actual rules systems.

== Publication history ==
Inner City was designed by Chris Clark, and published by Inner City Games Designs in 1982 as a boxed set containing a 40-page book, a large map, and six sheets of paper money.

== Reviews ==
- Game News #6 (Aug., 1985)
