= Kleinaitingen =

- Municipality
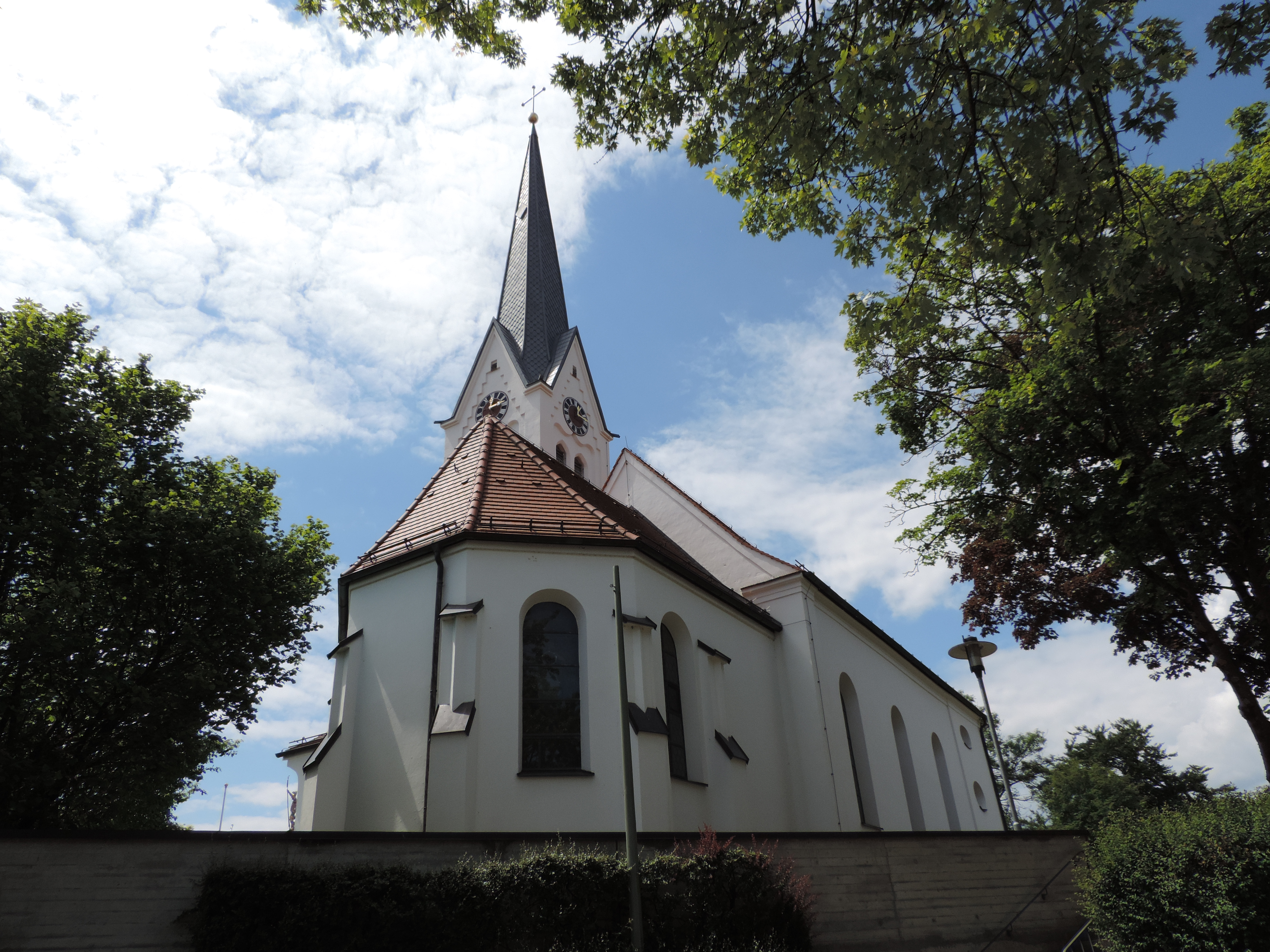
- Church of Saint Martin

- Coat of arms

- Location of Kleinaitingen within Augsburg district
- Interactive map of Kleinaitingen
- Location within Germany Location within Bavaria
- Coordinates: 48°13′N 10°50′E
- Country: Germany
- State: Bavaria
- Admin. region: Schwaben
- District: Augsburg
- Municipal assoc.: Großaitingen

Government
  - Mayor (2020–26): Rupert Fiehl

Area
  - Total: 15.67 km^{2} (6.05 sq mi)
- Elevation: 539 m (1,768 ft)

Population (2025-12-31)
  - Total: 1,267
  - Density: 80.86/km^{2} (209.4/sq mi)
- Time zone: UTC+01:00 (CET)
  - Summer (DST): UTC+02:00 (CEST)
- Postal codes: 86507
- Dialling codes: 08203
- Vehicle registration: A
- Website: www.kleinaitingen.de

Kleinaitingen is a municipality in the district of Augsburg in Bavaria in Germany.
