= Kuhsee =

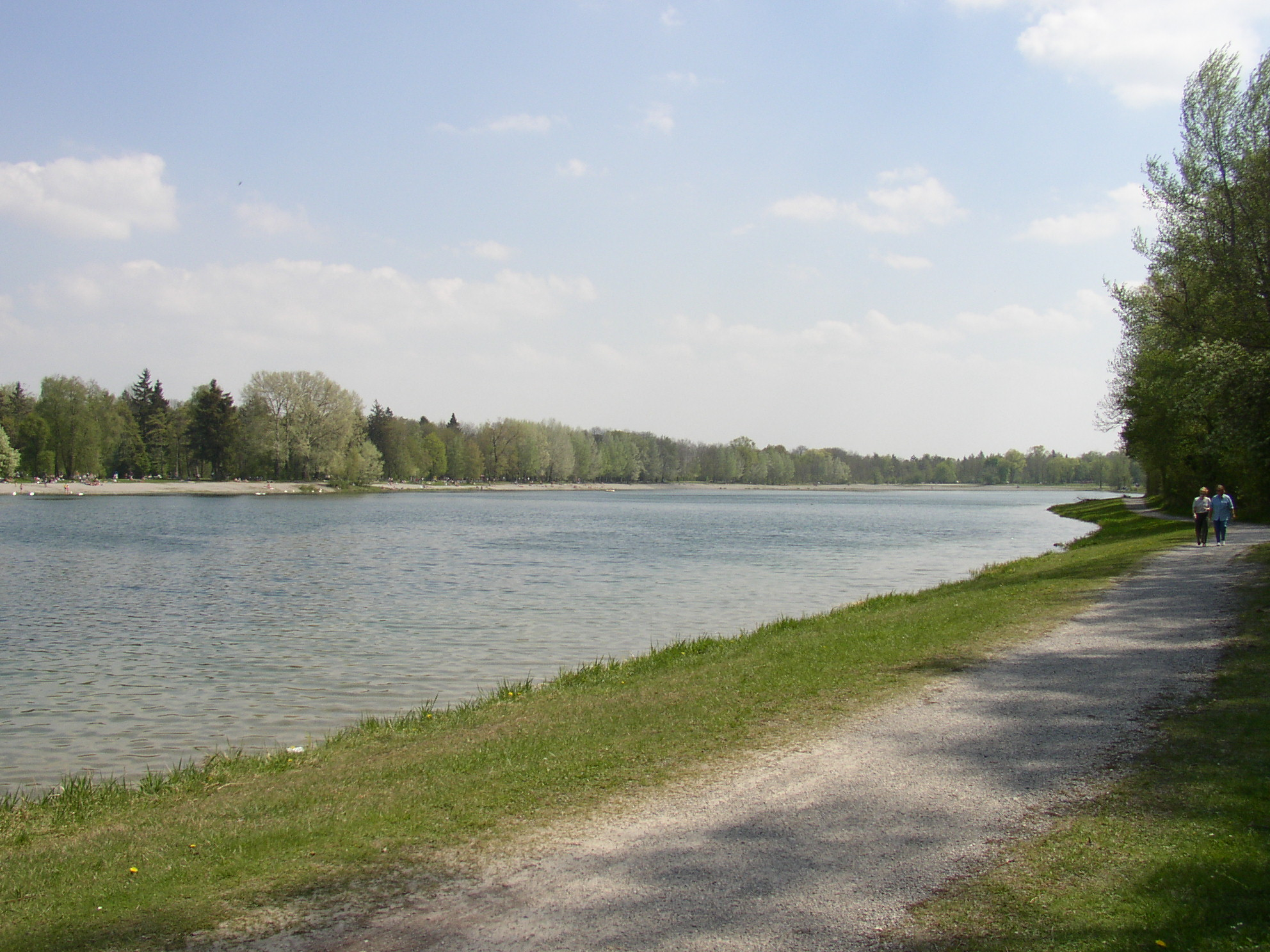

- Location within Bavaria
- Location: Augsburg-Hochzoll-Süd, Swabia, Bavaria
- Coordinates: 48°20′19.86″N 10°56′23.39″E
- Type: artificial lake
- Primary inflows: Lech
- Primary outflows: Lech
- Basin countries: Germany
- Max. length: ca. 1,100 m (3,600 ft)
- Max. width: 230 m (750 ft)
- Surface area: ca. 17 ha (42 acres)
- Max. depth: ca. 5 m (16 ft)
- Settlements: Augsburg

Kuhsee (German pronunciation: [ˈkuːzeː]) is a lake in Augsburg-Hochzoll-Süd, Swabia, Bavaria, Germany. Its surface area is ca. 17 ha.
