= Stadtbergen =

- Town
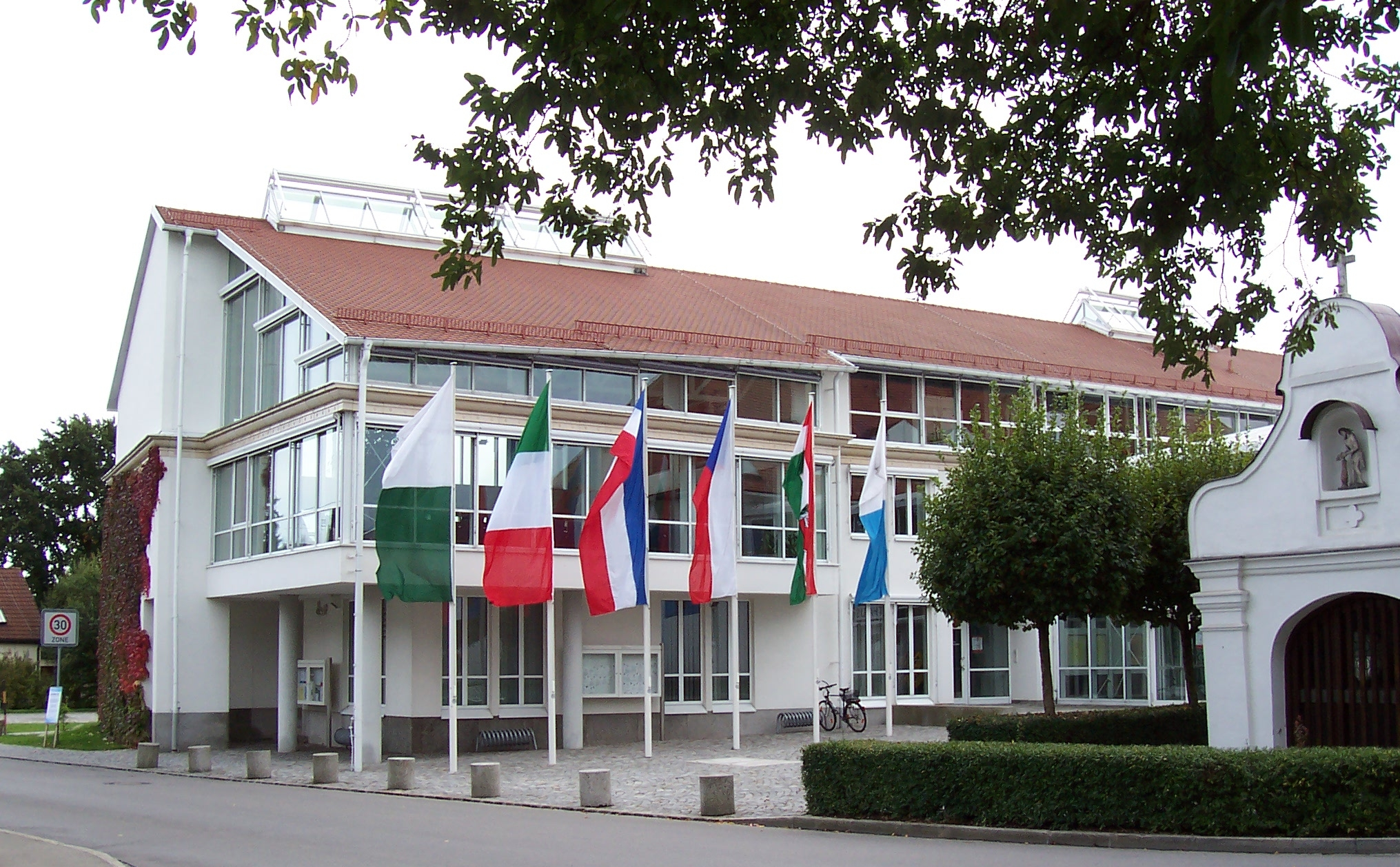
- Town hall

- Coat of arms

- Location of Stadtbergen within Augsburg district
- Interactive map of Stadtbergen
- Location within Germany Location within Bavaria
- Coordinates: 48°22′N 10°51′E
- Country: Germany
- State: Bavaria
- Admin. region: Schwaben
- District: Augsburg

Government
  - Mayor (2023–29): Paulus Metz (CSU)

Area
  - Total: 11.49 km^{2} (4.44 sq mi)
- Elevation: 481 m (1,578 ft)

Population (2025-12-31)
  - Total: 15,595
  - Density: 1,357/km^{2} (3,515/sq mi)
- Time zone: UTC+01:00 (CET)
  - Summer (DST): UTC+02:00 (CEST)
- Postal codes: 86391
- Dialling codes: 0821
- Vehicle registration: A
- Website: www.stadtbergen.de

Stadtbergen (German pronunciation: [ʃtatˈbɛʁɡn̩]; Swabian: Staberga) is a town in the district of Augsburg, in Bavaria, Germany. It is situated in the outskirts of Augsburg, 4 kilometres (2.5 mi) west of Augsburg city centre. Stadtbergen was granted town privileges in May 2007.

== Mayors ==
- Ludwig Fink (SPD): 1992–2011
- Paul Metz (CSU): since October 2011

== Local council ==
The town council has 24 seats. The elections in 2014 showed the following results:

- CSU: 11 seats
- SPD: 7 seats
- Freie Wähler (Free voters): 1 seat
- PRO Stadtbergen: 2 seats
- Alliance '90/The Greens: 3 seats
