= Lechbruck =

- Municipality
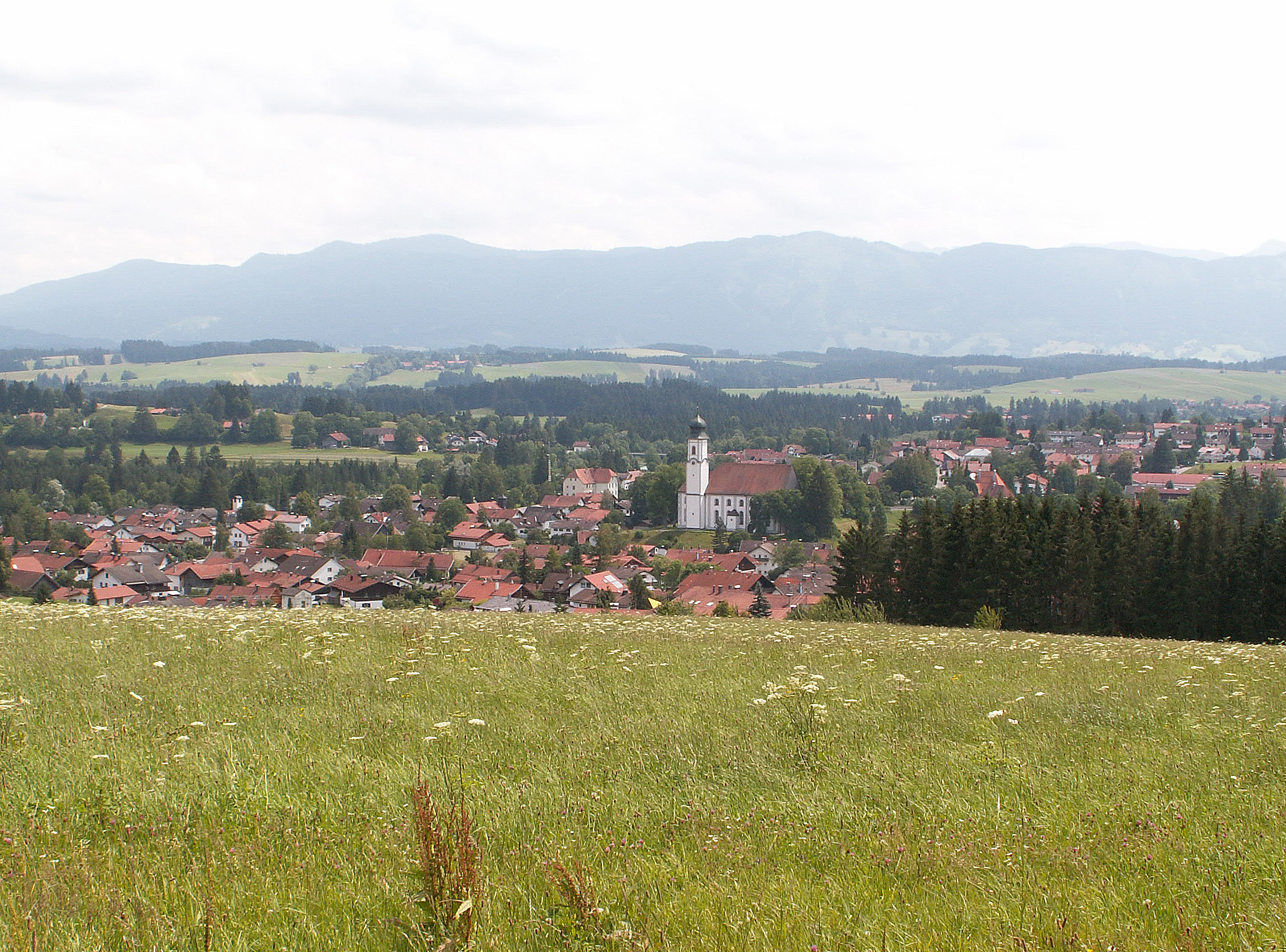
- Lechbruck

- Coat of arms

- Location of Lechbruck within Ostallgäu district
- Interactive map of Lechbruck
- Location within Germany Location within Bavaria
- Coordinates: 47°42′N 10°48′E
- Country: Germany
- State: Bavaria
- Admin. region: Schwaben
- District: Ostallgäu

Government
  - Mayor (2020–26): Werner Moll (FW)

Area
  - Total: 17.25 km^{2} (6.66 sq mi)
- Elevation: 737 m (2,418 ft)

Population (2025-12-31)
  - Total: 2,767
  - Density: 160.4/km^{2} (415.4/sq mi)
- Time zone: UTC+01:00 (CET)
  - Summer (DST): UTC+02:00 (CEST)
- Postal codes: 86983
- Dialling codes: 08862
- Vehicle registration: OAL
- Website: www.lechbruck.de

Lechbruck is a municipality in the district of Ostallgäu in Bavaria in Germany. It lies on the west bank of the river Lech.
