= Bundesstraße 16 =

Federal highway in Germany

B 16
- Bundesstraße 16

Route information
- Length: 340 km (210 mi)

Major junctions
- Northeast end: Bavarian Forest
- Southwest end: Füssen

Location
- Country: Germany
- States: Bavaria

Highway system
- Roads in Germany; Autobahns; List; Federal; List; State; E-roads

The Bundesstraße 16 or B 16 is one of the German federal highways crossing southern Bavaria from east to south. It runs from the Bavarian Forest to Regensburg and then along the river Danube to Günzburg. From Roding to Regensburg the highway is developed without any junctions and is in parts signed as B 16n. From Günzburg to Füssen the B 16 runs from north to south.

== Towns passed by the B 16 ==
Roding - Nittenau - Regensburg - Kelheim - Abensberg - Neustadt an der Donau - Vohburg - Ingolstadt - Neuburg a.d.Donau - Rain - Donauwörth - Höchstädt - Dillingen a.d.Donau - Lauingen - Gundelfingen - Günzburg - Ichenhausen - Krumbach - Mindelheim - Kaufbeuren - Marktoberdorf - Füssen

== New B 16 ==
There are attempts to develop this Bundesstraße without running through towns, and many bypasses have been built. There are main through-roads only between Lauingen and Donauwörth. Several bypasses are in planning:

- Dillingen an der Donau: planned 2009; construction planned to start 2010; completion due 2012;
- Höchstädt an der Donau: in planning; start of construction not before 2012;
- Tapfheim: preparatory planning
