= Klinikum St. Georg =

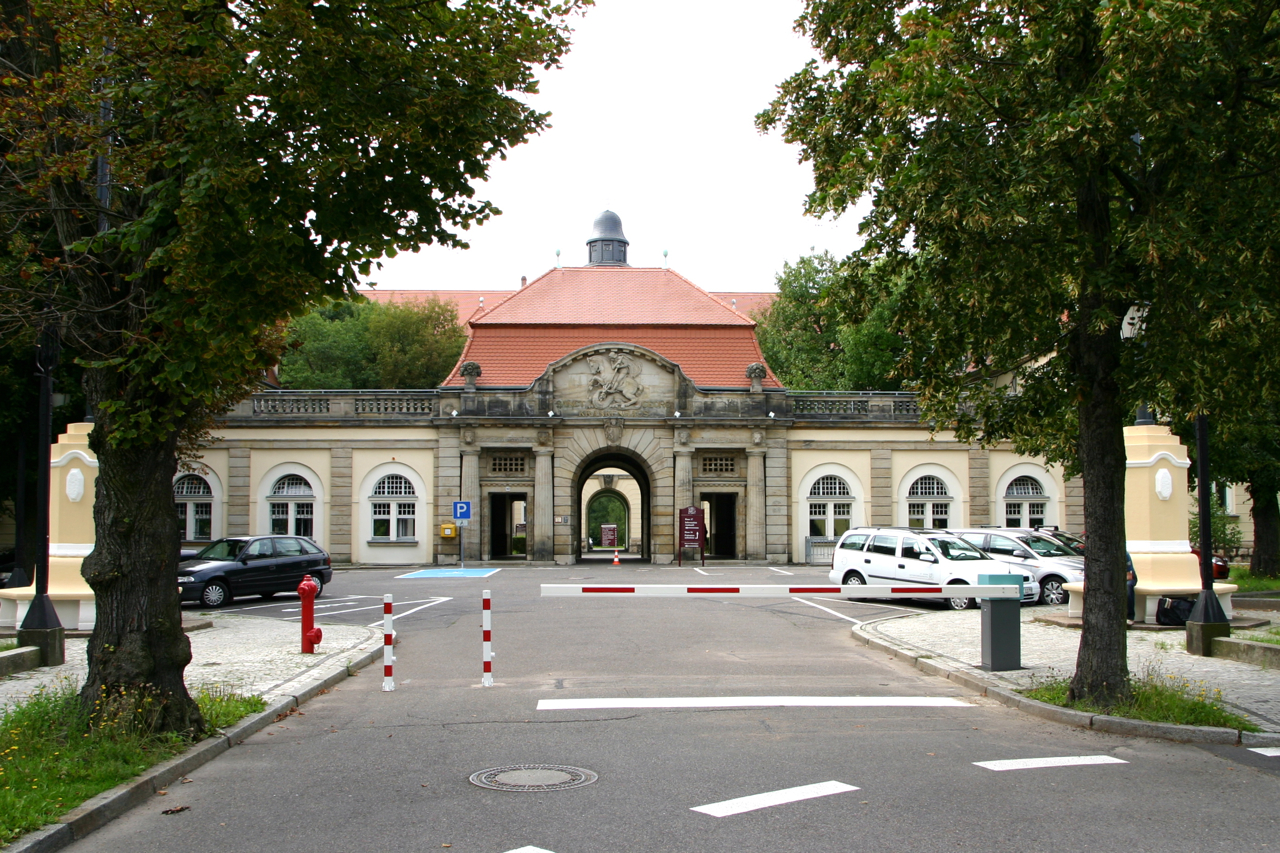
- Entrance to the hospital's clinic in Eutritzsch, Leipzig

Geography
- Location: Leipzig, Germany
- Coordinates: 51.3844°N 12.3772°E

Organisation
- Type: Teaching

Services
- Beds: 1066

History
- Opened: 1212

Links
- Website: Official website (in German)
- Lists: Hospitals in Germany

The Klinikum St. Georg is the oldest, and, after the University of Leipzig Medical Center, the second largest hospital in Leipzig, Germany. It was founded in 1212. It consists of the Klinikum St. Georg gGmbH, and the Municipal Hospital "St. Georg" Leipzig (operated by the City of Leipzig). The hospital currently employs over 3,500 people and has 1,066 beds in 25 clinics. In addition, the gGmbH and the municipal hospital function as an academic teaching hospital of Leipzig University.
