= University Medical Center =

Several institutions known as University Medical Center include:

- University Medical Center (Lubbock, Texas)
- University Medical Center (Tucson, Arizona)
- University Medical Center (UTA station)
- University Medical Center Freiburg
- University Medical Center Groningen
- University Medical Center Hamburg-Eppendorf
- University Medical Center New Orleans
- University Medical Center Schleswig Holstein
- University Medical Center Utrecht
- University Medical Center of El Paso
- University Medical Center of Princeton at Plainsboro
- University Medical Center of Southern Nevada
- University Medical Center of Tirana "Mother Teresa"
