= Letizia Paoli =

Italian criminologist

Letizia Paoli (born 24 October 1966) is a criminologist, originally from Prato. Since 2006 she has been a professor of the Law Faculty at Leuven/Louvain University. She served, between 2009 and 2016, as chair of the sometimes troubled "Freiburg Sports Medicine Commission" at Freiburg University.

Paoli holds dual German-Italian nationality and lives in Belgium. She has published extensively, notably on international drugs trading.

== Life ==
Paoli was born and grew up in Prato, a commercially dynamic city a short distance to the north-west of Florence in Italy. From 1990 she studied Political Sciences at Florence University, later moving on to the European University Institute (also in Florence) where she received her doctorate in 1997 in return for a piece of work entitled "The Pledge to Secrecy: Culture, Structure and Action of Mafia Associations". Her dissertation, which earned her a coveted "summa cum laude" citation, was supervised by Prof. Bernhard Giesen. She crossed the Alps and worked as an academic research assistant at the Tübingen University Institute for Criminology and at the Giessen University Institute for Sociology during 1996/97. From 1998 till 2006 she led a Research Group at the Max Planck Institute for Foreign and International Criminal Law in Freiburg i.B. In 2006 she switched to Leuven/Louvain University, half an hour to the east of Brussels, taking up a full professorship in Criminology.

== Freiburg Sports Medicine Commission ==
At the end of 2009, Letizia Paoli was appointed to chair the independent expert commission of enquiry mandated to evaluate activities of the department of rehabilitative and sports medicine at the Freiburg University Medical Center. She took over the role from Dr. Hans Joachim Schäfer who had been obliged to resign for health reasons. Commentators have suggested that under her direction the commission faced obstructive actions from vested interests and that Letizia Paoli herself was subjected to aggressively hostile whispering attacks. Her own approach became more robust and uncompromising over time, but after more than seven years, by the start of 2017 it had become apparent that the commission had failed to conclude its task timely and satisfactorily.

As commission chair, Paoli called upon Werner Franke to resign his membership of it, following leak allegations. However, in March 2015 a part-completed report on doping in the German football league was released by another commission member, Andreas Singler, indicating that the departure of Franke had not put an end to disagreements among its remaining members.

One unexpected by-product of the commission's investigation involved Hans-Hermann Dickhuth whose 1983 habilitation (academic qualification) had been based on a dissertation that allegedly contained extensive word-for-word quotations from the doctoral dissertation of one of his own students. The potential news value of an otherwise mainstream plagiarism scandal was enhanced by the fact that the student in question subsequently became Dickhuth's wife. As commission chair, Paoli reported the commission's assessment of the matter to the university rectorate. The matter was then leaked to the press. Some felt that the university's handling of the affair lacked the necessary transparency, and in the very public disagreement between Paoli and the university authorities which ensued it was reported, towards the end of 2014, that she had threatened to resign the commission chairmanship.

By this time publication of the commission's final report was believed to have been scheduled for Autumn/Fall 2015. However, Autumn/Fall 2015 came and went: in March 2016 the entire commission stepped down, amidst allegations that their work had been sabotaged, and with no sign of any final report.
