= Hans-Hermann Dickhuth =

- Born: 1 September 1947 (age 79); Braunschweig, Niedersachsen, West Germany
- Occupations: Sports doctor University teacher

Hans-Hermann Dickhuth (born 1 September 1947) is a retired university-based German sports doctor.

His name hit the headlines in 2011 when allegations surfaced that his 1983 habilitation (post-doctoral academic qualification) had been awarded for a dissertation that reportedly contained extensive word-for-word quotations from the doctoral dissertation of one or more of his own students. The potential news value of otherwise mainstream plagiarism accusations was enhanced by the fact that one of the students subsequently became Dickhuth's wife.

== Life ==
Hans-Hermann Dickhuth was born in Braunschweig. Following qualification, in 1978 he became an assistant to Joseph Keul at the Sports Medicine Department at the University of Freiburg. He completed his specialist training in Cardiology at the university. He subsequently headed up the Echocardiography Laboratory at Freiburg where he also worked as a senior clinical physician. In 1989 he transferred to the nearby University of Tübingen where he took charge of the Sports Medicine department. He developed it into a highly successful centre, both clinically and scientifically. After his former boss died in 2000 he returned to Freiburg, taking over in 2001 as Chief Doctor of Sports Medicine at the University Clinic.

That same year Dickhuth succeeded Keul as president of the German Society for Sports Medicine ("Deutsche Gesellschaft für Sportmedizin und Prävention" / DGSP), a position he retained till 2006. He also held leadership roles during this period in the International Federation of Sports Medicine ("Fédération Internationale de Médecine du Sport" / FIMS) and the European Federation of Sports Medicine Associations (EFSMA), serving as vice-president of the latter between 2002 and 2012.

From 1981 Dickhuth was supervising top German athletes. After receiving a report on "Doping allegations in respect of doctors in the Sports Medicine Department" ("Dopingvorwürfen gegenüber Ärzten der Abteilung Sportmedizin") the University Clinic eventually withdrew from providing this form of care for athletes. In the same report Dickhuth himself was cleared of any complicity or culpability in respect of doping allegations. It was, indeed, stated that following Dickhuth's appointment to the top job a number of organisational measures had been taken "to bring greater transparency to the individual working groups, patient reporting systems and drugs procurement processes, along with access to examination rooms and the outpatient clinics".

== Plagiarism accusation ==
On 25 February 2011 the university authorities received information from Letizia Paoli, chair of the "Sports Medicine Evaluation Commission", that while conducting investigations into the "Freiburg doping scandal", they had come across doubts concerning the academic integrity ("Wissenschaftlichkeit") of several pieces of work. As the result of information passed anonymously to the Frankfurter Allgemeine Zeitung the press became aware that questions had arisen concerning the dissertation with which Dickhuth had earned his habilitation (qualification) back in 1983. The allegation was that the dissertation employed text from the doctoral dissertation of one of Dickhuth's own students. The Badische Zeitung (newspaper) reported passages (repeated without attribution) identical to some that had appeared in another doctoral dissertation that same year. This time the dissertation identified was one successfully submitted by the student who had subsequently become Dickhuth's wife. The clinic management invited those involved to state their cases before 11 March 2011: Dickmuth took some time off work, starting on 4 March 2011, but returned to his desk on 16 April 2011. The university attempted to instigate a disciplinary process, but this was revoked by the Ministry for Science because of procedural errors. It was also far from clear whether the university management enjoyed the legal competence to revoke a habilitation that had been conferred by the habilitation committee of the university clinic. Reports appeared in the media indicating that the university rectorate had at this point already spent more than half a million Euros on consulting external lawyers.

- The former doctoral student Marzenna Orlowska, who subsequently took a job as a pathologist at the Freiburg University clinic, was questioned by reporters. She confirmed that Dickhuth had supervised her doctorate. He had repeatedly recommended changes to her dissertation. Meanwhile, his own habilitation dissertation had been submitted. She had indeed recognised certain passages at Dickhuth's inaugural lecture, but had attached no importance to this.

- "Especially among the medics, we often come across cases where a paper published by a single professor forms the basis for several dissertations. The underlying measurements in these therefore constitute the raw data for studies in which they are re-used without express reference back to the originally published dissertation."
- "Gerade bei Medizinern stoßen wir häufig darauf, dass ein zunächst allein vom betreuenden Professor publizierter Aufsatz die Grundlage mehrerer Dissertationen bildet. Die zugrunde liegenden Messwerte, also die Rohdaten von Studien, werden dann ohne Bezug auf die erste Veröffentlichung für Dissertationen weiterverwertet."

Gerhard Dannemann,
Law Professor at the Humboldt University and a member of the "VroniPlag Wiki" Plagiarism-hunting network, as quoted by Armin Himmelrath and Hermann Horstkotte.

The former doctoral student Marzenna Orlowska, who subsequently took a job as a pathologist at the Freiburg University clinic, was questioned by reporters. She confirmed that Dickhuth had supervised her doctorate. He had repeatedly recommended changes to her dissertation. Meanwhile, his own habilitation dissertation had been submitted. She had indeed recognised certain passages at Dickhuth's inaugural lecture, but had attached no importance to this.

Independently the Habilitation Committee of the Medical Faculty convened a meeting for 28 June 2012 to discuss the matter, but the meeting was adjourned.

Hans-Hermann Dickhuth has lived in retirement since 1 October 2012. An application submitted by him in 2011 to extend his contract was rejected by the faculty because they were working on a reconfiguration of the entire sports medicine department. Dickhuth therefore withdrew the application and received, in return, the opportunity to continue with his academic work at the faculty for a further year on an "emeritus" basis. On 14 October 2013 the Habilitation Committee of the Medical Faculty decided, by a narrow majority, to withdraw recognition of Dickhuth's habilitation on the basis of the alleged plagiarism. It was the first decision of this nature in the history of Freiburg University. Lawyers for Dickhuth gave notice that they would be mounting a legal challenge against the decision.

On 28 May 2014 a radio report indicated that other habilitation dissertations successfully submitted at Freiburg University also included extensive textual congruences with doctoral works by others. Some of these habilitation dissertations came from professors who had themselves backed the university's withdrawal of recognition from Dickhuth's habilitation. Furthermore, textual analysis suggested that some of the textual extracts in question appeared to have been composed by Dickhuth himself. Also, these dissertations had been submitted only after the submission of Dickhuth's own dissertation. The various timelines meant that it was impossible that Dickhuth had himself copied the questionable passages in his dissertation text.

One of the professors identified in this context was Jörg Rüdiger Siewert, the medical director at the University Clinic. He had urged that recognition for Dickhuth's habilitation be rescinded in order to avoid giving out the impression that academic misconduct was not viewed with sufficient seriousness at Freiburg. Reports subsequently emerged alleging that Siewert's own habilitation dissertation, submitted many years earlier, was suspiciously similar to the doctoral dissertation of his former colleague, Hans-Fred Weiser.

In September 2014 the withdrawal of recognition from Dickhuth's dissertation became final. The Habilitation Committee had not accepted the legal challenge which Dickhuth had himself withdrawn on 12 September 2014. There was talk of "a deal". Disciplinary proceedings against Dickhuth were suspended on 9 September 2014. He retains the status and privileges of a retired public servant and remains entitled to use the title "Professor", having properly fulfilled his duties as a professor. In February 2016 the grounds for withdrawal of recognition for Dickhuth's dissertation were made public: Dickhuth had indeed composed the contentious section of text himself, but by making them available to six of his doctoral students he had assigned authorship rights to them, in the process excluding his own rights.

Not everyone has been convinced that culpability properly rests with Dickhuth. According to Gerhard Dannemann, an authority on the relevant legal background, the case can be persuasively made that it was, in fact, the doctoral students who were the plagiarists. A lengthy analysis of the affair appeared in the journal Laborjournal, and concluded that Dickhuth should not have been deprived of his academic qualification. According to this analysis, Dickhuth could be seen as a pawn, sacrificed to prop up the declining reputation of the University Clinic as a way to avoid budget cuts. In pursuit of that objective, however, the university had expended a seven-digit sum. In other known cases involving habilitation dissertations by top academics in the Medical Faculty, the university management had stayed silent, neither passing the scripts to the relevant investigatory commission, nor even informing the physicians implicated. The report also included the charge against the relevant sub-committee of the habilitation committee that its work had been "slapdash and error-ridden" ("schlampig und fehlerhaft"). According to the "Laborjournal" piece the subcommittee chairman Norbert Südkamp's own habilitation dissertation had included "agreements" in its figures and tables with those appearing in three other dissertations. The report concluded that instead of purporting to revoke Dikhuth's habilitation, the university should have revoked the doctorates awarded to his former doctoral pupils, the misses Orlowska and Wehinger.
