= Werner Pöls =

German historian and politician

Werner Pöls (March 15, 1926 – February 21, 1989) was a German historian and politician, and a representative of the German Christian Democratic Union.

Pöls was an academic advisor at the Friedrich Meinecke Institute at the Free University of Berlin from the beginning of the 1960s. In 1969 he was appointed to the Technical University of Braunschweig.

== Literature ==
- Wolfgang Weber: Biographisches Lexikon zur Geschichtswissenschaft in Deutschland, Österreich und der Schweiz. Die Lehrstuhlinhaber für Geschichte von den Anfängen des Faches bis 1970. Frankfurt/M. u. a. 1984, S. 449, ISBN 3-8204-8005-6
- Das Historische Seminar der Technischen Universität Braunschweig 1969–1982. Braunschweig 1982 [Werner Pöls anlässlich seiner Emeritierung gewidmet; verfielfältigtes Typoskript, vorhanden in der Universitätsbibliothek Braunschweig]
- Günther Grünthal und Klaus Erich Pollmann: Einleitung. In: Werner Pöls, Studien zur Bismarckzeit. Aufsatzsammlung zum 60. Geburtstag. [darin zehn wieder abgedruckte Aufsätze von Pöls], hrsg. von Günther Grünthal und Klaus Erich Pollmann, Hildesheim u. a. 1986, S. VII-XI, ISBN 3-487-07726-4
- Franz J. Bauer: Geschichte des Deutschen Hochschulverbandes. München 2000, S. 181–187 u. öfter, ISBN 3-598-11440-0

== See also ==
- List of German Christian Democratic Union politicians
