= Far Eastern State University of Humanities =

Public university in Khabarovsk, Russia

- Дальневосточный Государственный Гуманитарный Университет
- Former names: Khabarovsk State Pedagogical University
- Type: Public
- Established: 1934
- Rector: Yuri Prokhorenko
- Administrative staff: 300+
- Students: 5,500 full-time
- Location: 68 Karla Marksa St, Khabarovsk, Khabarovsk Krai, Russia; 48°29′10″N 135°04′50″E
- Website: www.khspu.ru
- Building details
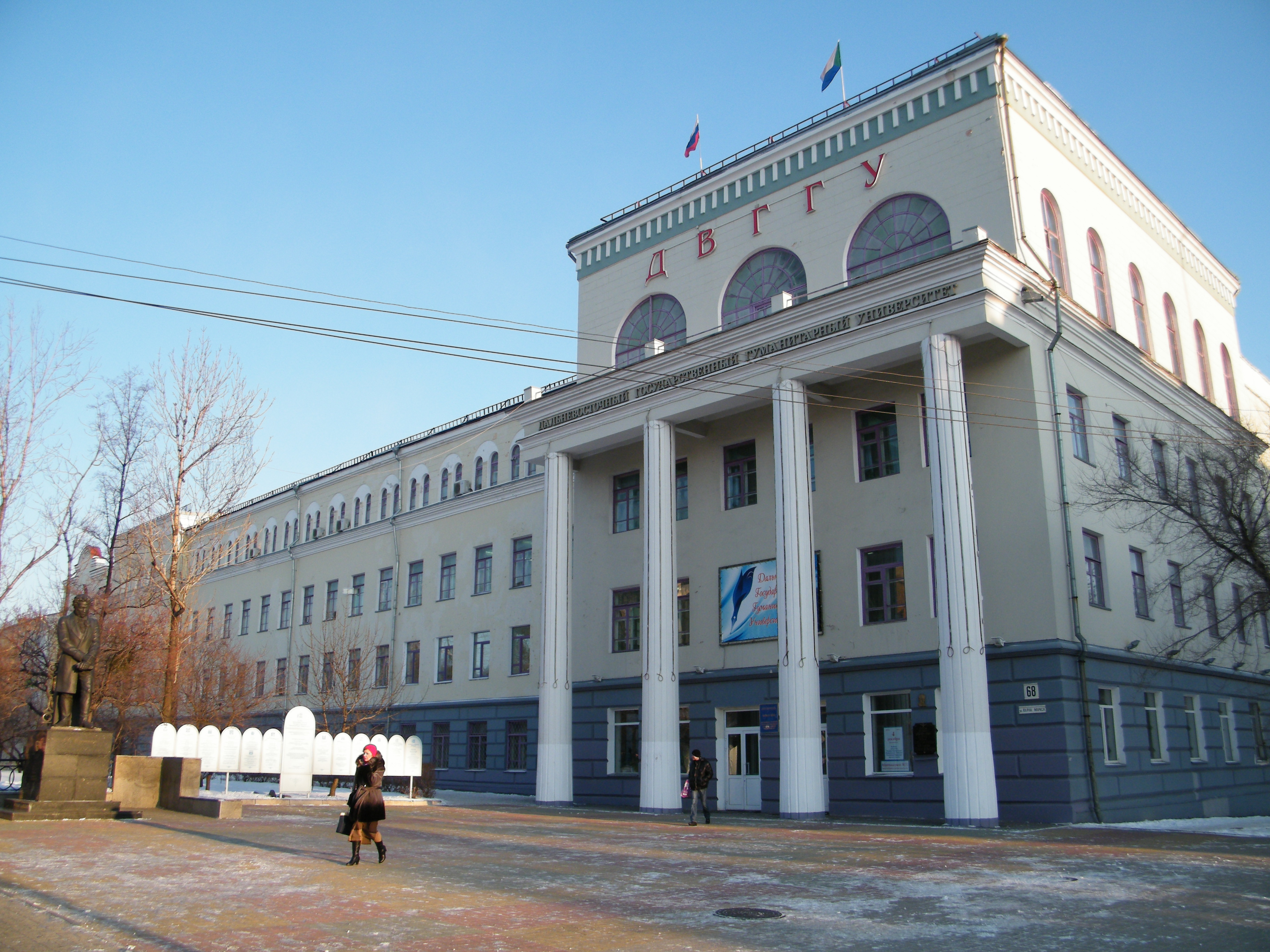
- Main building

The Far Eastern State University of Humanities (previously KSPU — Khabarovsk State Pedagogical University) is a university in Khabarovsk Krai, in the Far East of Russia.

== History ==
=== Establishment ===
Far Eastern State University of Humanities was initially established as a Pedagogical Institute. The decision to establish a new Pedagogical Institute in the Far East of the USSR was made in the year 1934.

=== Expansion and growth ===
Following the development of the institute and overall faculty growth in 1994, the Ministry of Education and Science of the Russian Federation transformed the institute into a Pedagogical University. In 2005, following the federal decision it was renamed to the Far Eastern State University of Humanities.

=== Divisions and faculties ===
- Institute of psychology and management
- Faculty of physical culture
- Faculty of Biology and Chemistry
- Art and Design Division
- History Department
- Institute of Mathematics, Physics and Informational Technology
- Faculty of Philology
- Faculty of Special Psychology and Pedagogy
- Institute of Linguistics and International Communications
- Eastern Languages Department

Currently Far Eastern State University of Humanities has 6 campuses with specialized study and lecture halls and laboratories. There is an extensive library with specialized divisions for science, psychology and pedagogical practices, as well as rare books division and an international literature division.

=== International partners ===
In early 1990 the University established a cooperation partnership with Lewis & Clark College (Portland, OR, USA). There are also established relations with the University of Hawaii (USA), and Osaka University (Japan), as well as cooperation agreements with University of Zurich (Switzerland) and University of Augsburg (Germany). In addition to student exchange programs this allows for joint scientific research and development studies.
