= Augsburg Hospital =

University Hospital Augsburg

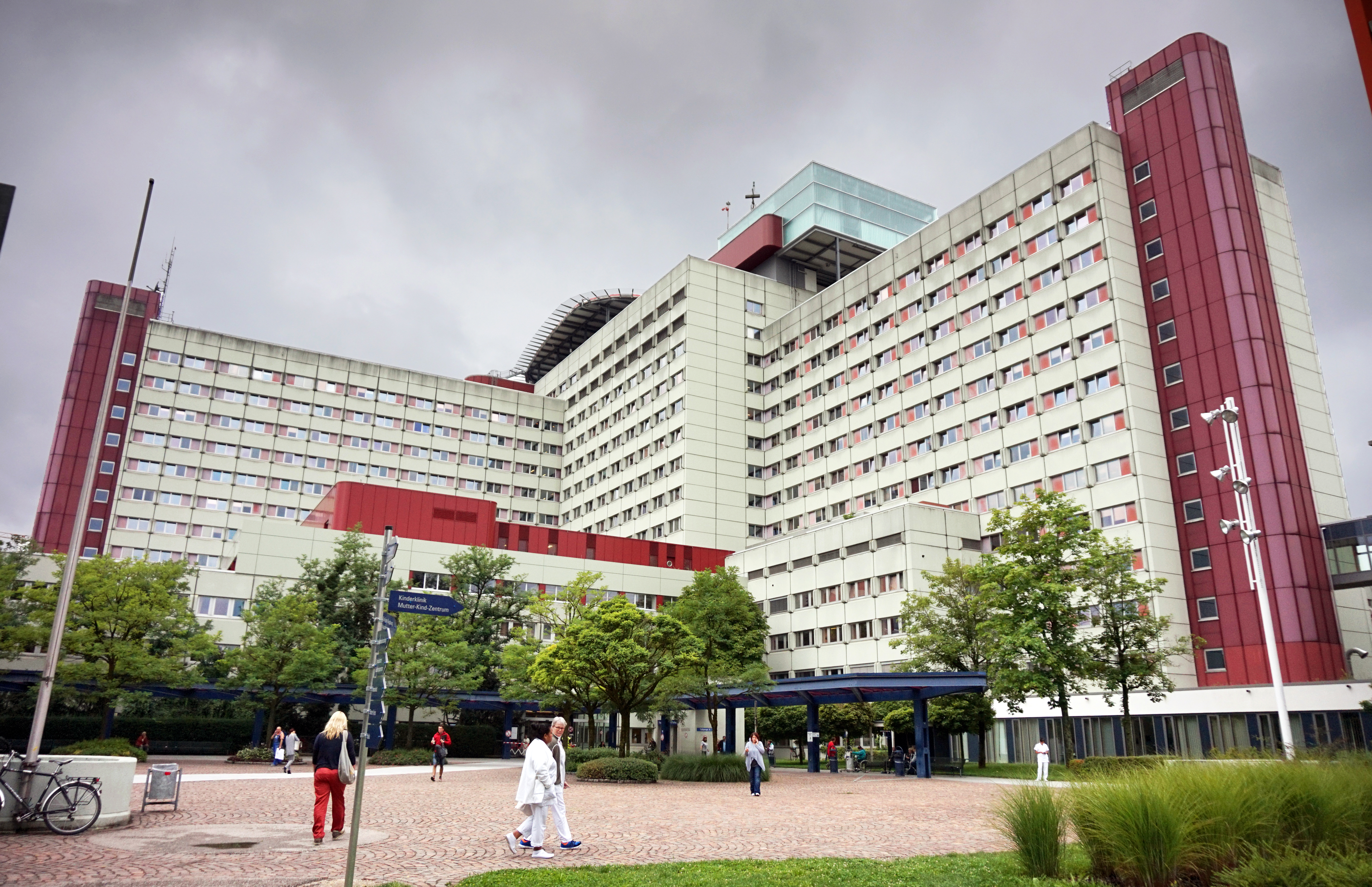
- University Hospital Augsburg

Geography
- Location: Augsburg, Germany
- Coordinates: 48°23′09″N 10°50′15″E

Organisation
- Care system: German public health insurance
- Type: Teaching
- Affiliated university: Universität Augsburg

Services
- Standards: all departments: ISO 9001 – KTQ certification.
- Emergency department: Emergency department available (Zentrale Notaufnahme)
- Beds: 1,737

History
- Former name: Klinikum Augsburg
- Founded: 1982

Links
- Website: www.uk-augsburg.de
- Lists: Hospitals in Germany

University Hospital Augsburg (Universitätsklinikum Augsburg) is one of the largest medical centers in Germany, with about 1,750 beds, located in Augsburg, Bavaria. It serves as a teaching hospital of the University of Augsburg and is the only hospital providing maximum-level care in the Swabia region of Bavaria.

The hospital operates at two locations in Augsburg: the main campus on Stenglinstraße in the district of Kriegshaber and a second site on Sauerbruchstraße in the district of Haunstetten.

The University Hospital Augsburg comprises a total of 23 clinics and three institutes, as well as other medical treatment areas and centers. More than 6,000 employees, including around 900 doctors and around 2,500 nurses, work for the health of patients.

On January 1, 2019, the municipal enterprise Klinikum Augsburg became the University Hospital Augsburg in the sponsorship of the State of Bavaria. Since that moment, the hospital serves the education of students of the medical faculty of the University of Augsburg. Until then, it was an academic teaching hospital of LMU Munich.

== Gallery ==
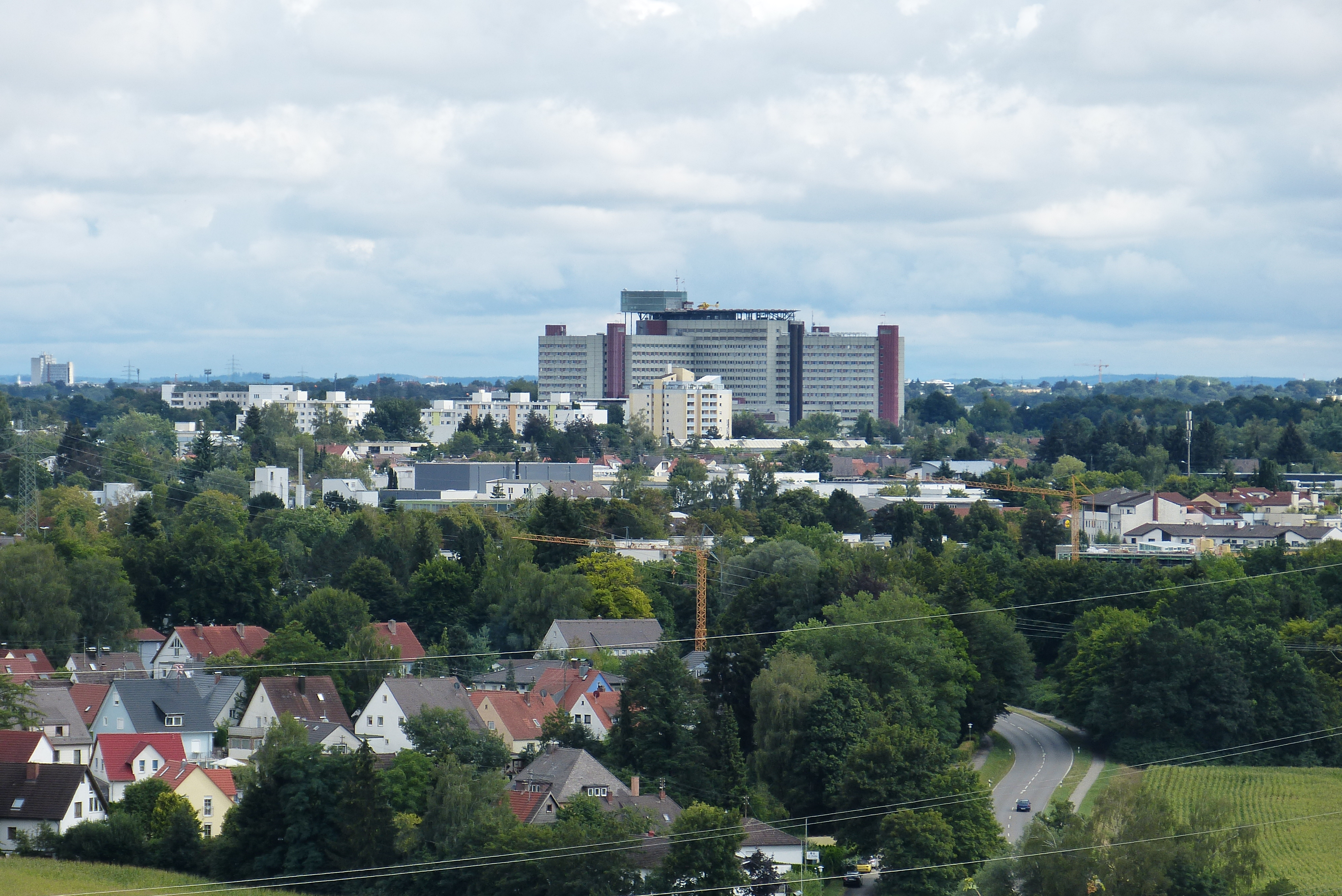
Augsburg Clinic photographed from the northwest (Hammelberg in Neusäß). In the foreground Alt-Neusäß.

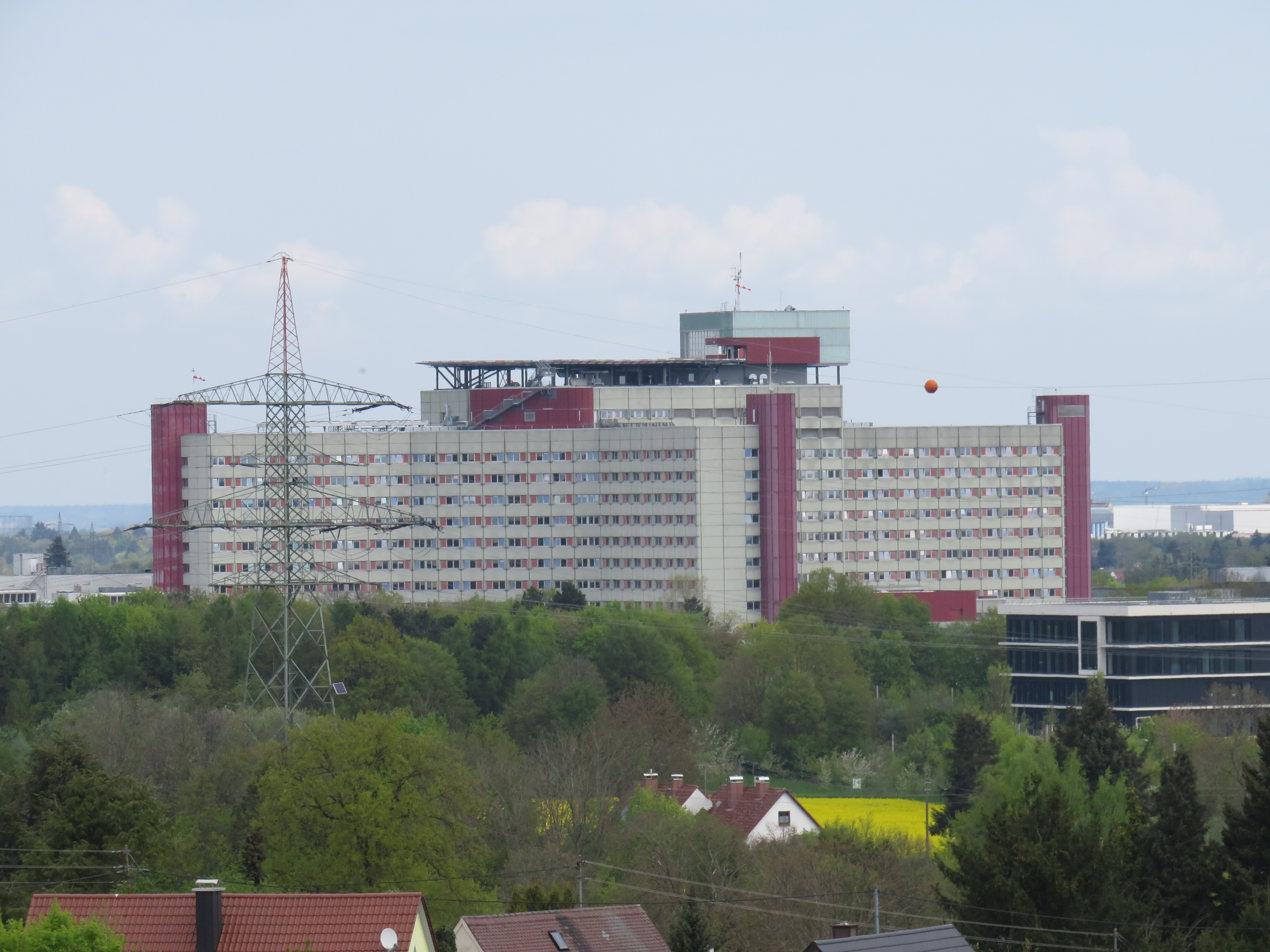
Augsburg Central Hospital from the eastern bank of the Bismarck Tower.

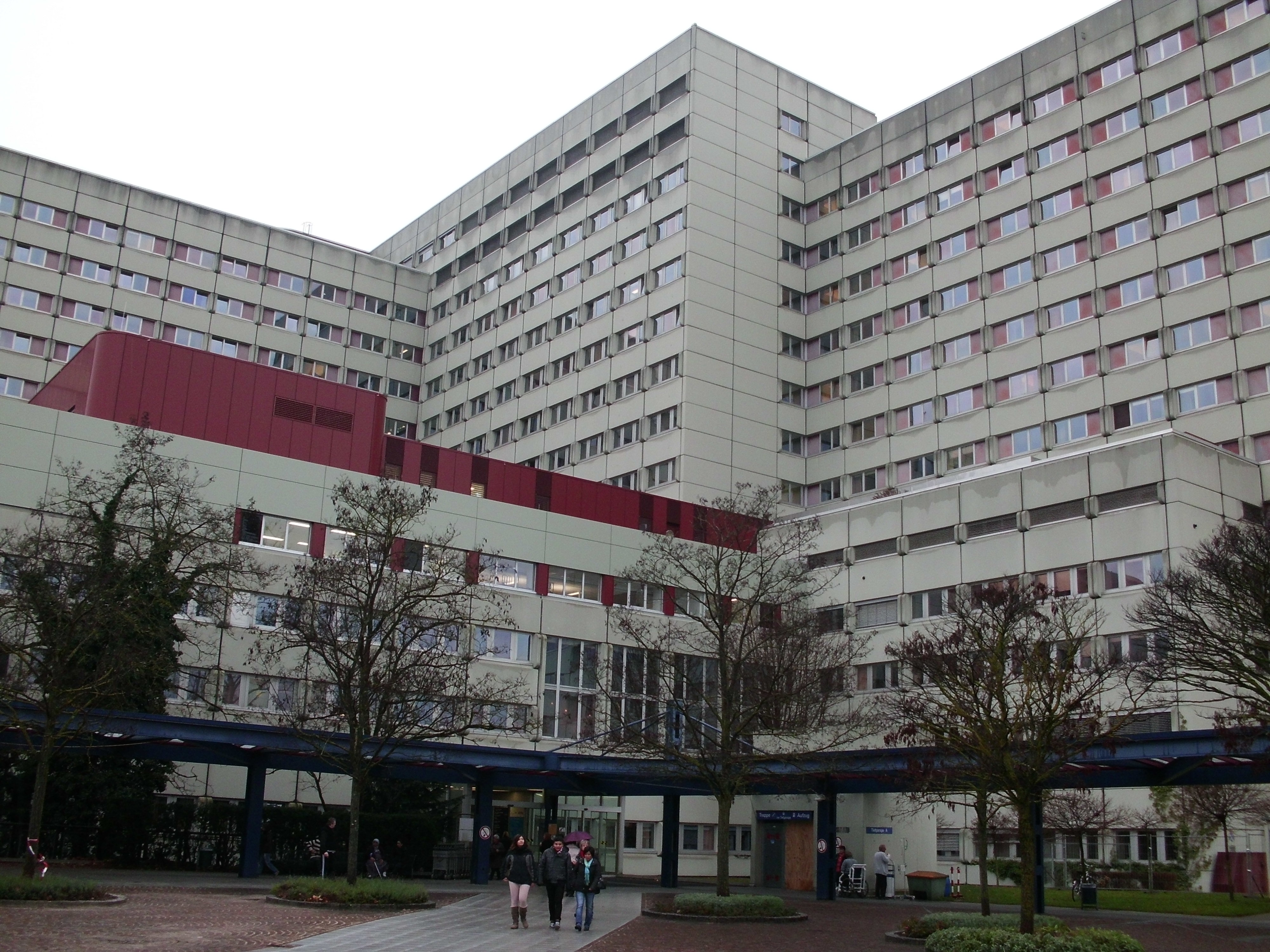
Main entrance to the Augsburg Hospital
