= Augsburg-Haunstetten =

Area of Augsburg, Germany

Coordinates: 48.308°N 10.904°E

The coat of arms of Haunstetten

Haunstetten (German pronunciation: [haʊnˈʃtɛtn̩]), also known as Haunstetten-Siebenbrunn, is one of the seventeen Planungsräume (English: Planning district, singular: Planungsraum) of Augsburg, Bavaria, Germany. It is the largest of the seventeen Planungsräume with an area of 32.59 km² (12.58 mi²). It is one of the most heavily populated subdivisions of Augsburg, with over 25,000 inhabitants. The town of Siebenbrunn was its own entity until 1910 when it was annexed to Augsburg, and Haunstetten was its own city from 1952 until 1972, when Bavaria underwent extensive reform of its political subdivisions and Haunstetten was also annexed to Augsburg. The population stood at 26,291 as of December 31, 2010.

== Geography ==
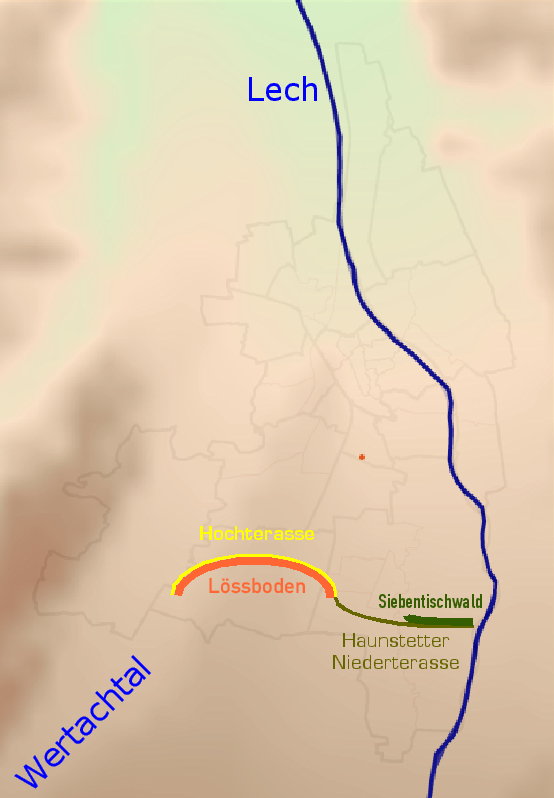
The topography of Haunstetten relative to the rest of Augsburg.

Haunstetten is the southernmost subdivision of Augsburg and lies between the rivers Lech, Wertach and Singold, on a river terrace. The Planungsraum comprises five Stadtbezirke, (English: Ward, singular: Stadtbezirk) the 12th, 33rd, 34th, 35th, and 36th Stadtbezirke, which are named Siebenbrunn, Haunstetten-Nord (North), Haunstetten-Süd (South), Haunstetten-Ost (East) and Haunstetten-West, respectively. Haunstetten borders five other Planungsräume even though its entire eastern and southern borders are the municipal boundaries of Augsburg. Haunstetten borders Inningen to the west, Universitätsviertel to the northwest, Spickel-Herrenbach and Hochzoll to the north. Haunstetten also shares an extremely short border with Hochfeld along its northwestern edge. Haunstetten is bordered to the east by the Haunstetten Forest, which runs along the entire eastern border of the Planungsraum. The lowland geography of Haunstetten has allowed for the development of extensive heathlands.

== History ==
It has been known that Haunstetten is a long-settled area since the construction of a Siemens AG factory in 1896 uncovered several sites of archaeological interest. Dating of materials from these sites have revealed the settlement of the Haunstetten area stretched back as far as the Neolithic period, but also date more recently to the Bronze Age and the time of the Urnfield culture. In Roman times, Haunstetten was located on a trade route which ran from Augsburg, founded in 15 BC as a Roman outpost, to Füssen, through Bolzano, and eventually to Rome. This was the Augustus road, also known as the Via Claudia Augusta, which itself had been laid between 47 and 46 BC. Although Haunstetten is not historically known from Roman times, finds of Roman coins imply some level of settlement.

=== Written history ===
Haunstetten was first mentioned in a historical context in 919, when it was known as Husteten. Augsburg became the site of the main cloister for the Order of Saint Benedict for the Basilica for Saints Ulrich and Afra, the largest church in Augsburg, in 1012. The city retained this honor for several centuries, losing it in 1803. During the time the city held this position, it was known as the Ulrikanisches Dorf, (English: Ulrich village or Ulrich's village), and the estate house belonging to the Abbey of St. Ulrich was located in the city. A stone from the abbey bearing the coat of arms of the abbot and the stamped date, 1715, can still be seen. The city and its churches were completely destroyed during the Thirty Years' War, although later rebuilt.

=== Since 1800 ===
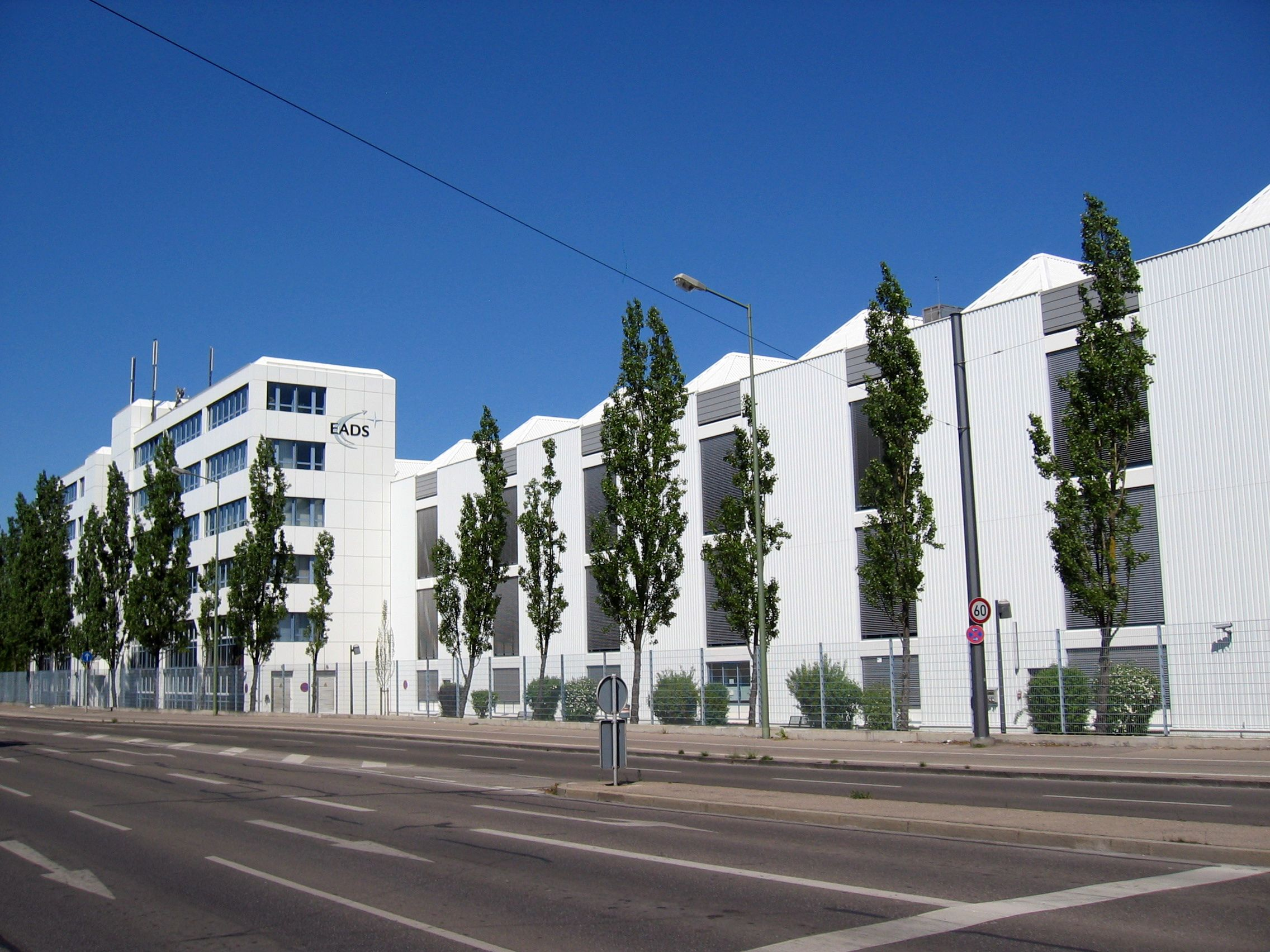
The EADS production plant on Haunstetter Straße.

Industry began to develop in the Haunstetten area in the early 19th century when local families built a bleach factory. After 20 years the factory was bought out and developed into a larger textile mill. Other industries began to develop in the Haunstetten area, including larger companies such as Messerschmitt. A hospital and fire department were constructed in 1900 with the help of the local commerce minister, and a new school was secured for the area in 1904.

The area was severely damaged by air raids in the Second World War. Many buildings were destroyed and many residents died. After the conclusion of the war, the German monetary reform also struck the region hard, causing widespread famine and hunger emergencies, in which the Red Cross intervened. Control of the city was given back to the previous mayor by the American occupation forces. Haunstetten became a popular place for refugees and asylum seekers, and the area grew rapidly as new houses, apartment blocks and businesses opened. The population growth was so strong so as to necessitate the building of another school in the area, which opened in 1952, the same year Haunstetten was granted home rule. A new Roman Catholic church was built in the city in 1954, and in 1960 a natural hot springs was opened as a public attraction. The area's schools were expanded, and a new school built, between 1958 and 1968. The city was absorbed into the city of Augsburg in 1972 as part of Bavaria-wide political subdivision reform.

=== Involvement in World War II ===
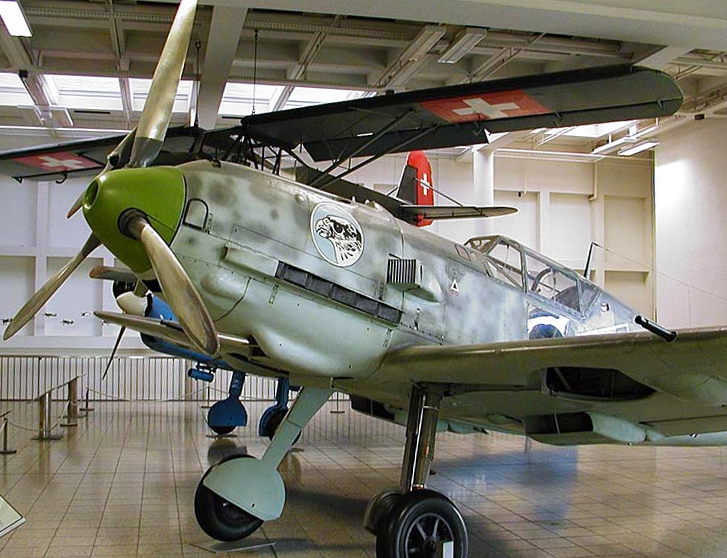
A Messerschmitt Bf 109E, a model built at the Haunstetten Messerschmitt facilities.

As the seat of a factory of the powerful Messerschmitt corporation, Haunstetten became a wartime production center during World War II. Two large production centers, Werk III and Werk IV were located in Haunstetten, in what is now Universitätsviertel, although now these production facilities belong to EADS and DaimlerChrysler Aerospace. The number of production facilities located in Haunstetten led to pressure on the local housing market as production laborers, researchers and engineers came from all over Germany to work for the Messerschmitt facilities. This led to the construction of the Messerschmittsiedlung (English: Messerschmitt settlement), which was completed in 1937 and was expanded in 1939. This influx of workers also lead to a rapid increase of the resident population of Haunstetten, which increased from 3,000 in 1933 to 8,000 in 1945. Although only 6,000 worked at the Messerschmitt facilities in 1936, this number grew to 9,000 by 1939 and by 1944 the worker population had reached 18,000 - of which 47% were either foreign or forced laborers. Three barracks were built for forced laborers to live in. Further forced labor for the Messerschmitt production facilities was obtained from a satellite of Dachau concentration camp, which was located near a gravel quarry close to the border with Inningen.

The Messerschmitt production facilities were a very important center of arms, especially of fighter aircraft such as the Messerschmitt Bf 109. Over 34,000 of this model were produced at the Messerschmitt facilities by the end of the war. Because of the strategic importance of the aircraft works, the Messerschmitt facilities and the surrounding areas were bombed by American and British air raids, which killed 165 people, including 70 prisoners from the Dachau satellite camp. The American and British bombing raids caused significant damage to the Haunstetten area. Although the exact death toll of captured laborers and prisoners at the Dachau satellite camp is not known, the war and subsequent bombing raids killed 300 residents and destroyed one quarter of all residences in the area. The war was declared over in Haunstetten on April 28, 1945, as American forced claimed the area.

== See also ==
- Anajo
- Ernst Troeltsch
