= List of hospitals in Germany =

The following is a list of hospitals in Germany.

== Hospitals ==
Hospital	City	Hospital beds	Website
Charité – Universitätsmedizin Berlin	Berlin	3,011	www.charite.de
University Hospital Heidelberg	Heidelberg	1,991	www.klinikum.uni-heidelberg.de
LMU Klinikum	Munich	2,050	www.lmu-klinikum.de
Vivantes Hospital Group	Berlin	5,856	www.vivantes.de
University Medical Center Hamburg-Eppendorf	Hamburg	1,436	www.uke.de
Hannover Medical School	Hanover	1,520	www.mh-hannover.de
Rechts der Isar Hospital	Munich	1,091	www.mri.tum.de
University Hospital Cologne	Cologne	1,464	www.uk-koeln.de
University Medical Center Freiburg	Freiburg	2,169	www.uniklinik-freiburg.de
University Medical Center Schleswig Holstein	Kiel	2,590	www.uksh.de
University Hospital Regensburg	Regensburg	833	www.ukr.de
University Hospital Erlangen	Erlangen	1,378	www.ukr.de
University Medical Center Göttingen	Göttingen	1,554	www.umg.eu
University Hospital Carl Gustav Carus	Dresden	1,295	www.uniklinikum-dresden.de
University Hospital of Düsseldorf	Düsseldorf	1,303	www.uniklinik-duesseldorf.de
University Hospital Mannheim	Mannheim	1,352	www.en.umm.de
Uniklinik RWTH Aachen	Aachen	1,517	
Universitätsklinikum Würzburg	Würzburg	1,438	
Universitätsklinikum Bonn	Bonn	1,237	
Universitätsmedizin Mainz	Mainz	1,662	
Klinikum Nürnberg Nord	Nuremberg	1,291	
Universitätsklinikum Essen	Essen	1,260	
University of Leipzig Medical Center	Leipzig	1,345	
Asklepios Klinik St. Georg	Hamburg	665	
Universitätsklinikum Jena	Jena	1,396	
Universitätsklinikum des Saarlandes	Homburg	1,202	
Universitätsklinikum Tübingen	Tübingen	1,559	
St. Bernward Krankenhaus	Hildesheim	508	www.bernward-khs.de
Helios Klinikum Hildesheim	Hildesheim	578	
AMEOS Klinikum Hildesheim	Hildesheim	579	
Universitätsklinikum Ulm	Ulm	1,150	
BG Universitätsklinikum Bergmannsheil	Bochum	543	
Asklepios Klinik Barmbek	Hamburg	656	
Bundeswehrkrankenhaus Ulm	Ulm	443	
Universitätsklinikum Halle (Saale)	Halle (Saale)	984	
Universitätsmedizin Greifswald	Greifswald	919	
Universitätsklinikum Münster	Münster	1,457	www.ukm.de
Schön Klinik Hamburg Eilbek	Hamburg	754	
Klinikum Nürnberg Süd	Nuremberg	909	
Universitätsklinikum Frankfurt	Frankfurt am Main	1,297	
Robert-Bosch-Krankenhaus – Klinik Schillerhöhe	Stuttgart	673	
Klinikum Braunschweig	Brunswick	1,428	
Klinikum Köln-Merheim	Cologne	752	
Universitätsklinikum Magdeburg	Magdeburg	1,087	
Zentralklinik Bad Berka	Bad Berka	728	
St. Franziskus-Hospital Münster	Münster	620	
Klinikum Dortmund	Dortmund	1422	www.klinikumdo.de
Albertinen-Krankenhaus	Hamburg	569	
Karlsruhe Municipal Hospital	Karlsruhe	1,057	
Krankenhaus Nordwest	Frankfurt am Main	509	
München Klinik Bogenhausen	Munich	959	
Marienhospital Stuttgart	Stuttgart	761	
Klinikum Ludwigshafen	Ludwigshafen	963	
Brüderhaus Koblenz	Coblenz	201	
Gemeinschaftskrankenhaus Bonn, Haus St. Petrus	Bonn	236	
Städt. Klinikum Dresden-Friedrichstadt	Dresden	951	
UKGM Gießen und Marburg	Marburg	1,098	
Klinikum Stuttgart – Olgahospital / Frauenklinik	Stuttgart	1,347	
Waldkliniken Eisenberg	Eisenberg	211	
Alfried Krupp Krankenhaus Rüttenscheid	Essen	573	
Israelitisches Krankenhaus Hamburg	Hamburg	138	
Universitätsklinikum Knappschaftskrankenhaus Bochum	Bochum	485	
Evangelisches Klinikum Bethel	Bielefeld	1,322	
St. Josef-Hospital Klinikum der Ruhr-Universität Bochum	Bochum	708	
Krankenhaus der Barmherzigen Brüder Trier	Trier	632	
Universitätsklinikum Augsburg	Augsburg	1,699	
Asklepios Klinik Altona	Hamburg	657	
Bürgerhospital Frankfurt am Main	Frankfurt am Main	334	
Klinikum Ludwigsburg	Ludwigsburg	1,005	
Unfallkrankenhaus Berlin	Berlin	574	
Helios Klinikum Erfurt	Erfurt	1,300	
Evangelisches Krankenhaus Königin Elisabeth Herzberge	Berlin	707	
Agaplesion Frankfurter Diakonie Kliniken	Frankfurt am Main	697	
Barmherzige Brüder Klinik St. Elisabeth Straubing	Straubing	450	
DRK Kliniken Berlin | Köpenick	Berlin	525	
DRK Kliniken Berlin | Westend	Berlin	925	https://www.drk-kliniken-berlin.de/westend/
Jüdisches Krankenhaus Berlin	Berlin	840	https://www.juedisches-krankenhaus.de/home.html
Gemeinschaftskrankenhaus Havelhöhe	Berlin	358	
Kliniken Dr. Erler	Nuremberg	244	
Krankenhaus der Augustinerinnen	Cologne	300	
Krankenhaus Martha-Maria Halle-Dölau	Halle (Saale)	510	
Krankenhaus Barmherzige Brüder Regensburg	Regensburg	905	
Kliniken Maria Hilf, Krankenhaus St. Franziskus	Mönchengladbach	499	
Kath. Marienkrankenhaus	Hamburg	605	
St. Elisabeth-Krankenhaus Köln-Hohenlind	Cologne	424	
Klinikum Esslingen	Esslingen am Neckar	655	
Vivantes Humboldt-Klinikum Berlin	Berlin	636	
Klinikum Dritter Orden München-Nymphenburg	Munich	592	
Universitätsmedizin Rostock	Rostock	1,028	
Schwarzwald-Baar Klinikum Villingen-Schwenningen	Villingen-Schwenningen	782	
DIAKOVERE Friederikenstift	Hanover	562	
München Klinik Neuperlach	Munich	545	
Klinikum St. Marien Amberg	Amberg	588	
Städtisches Klinikum Dresden Neustadt/Trachau	Dresden	619	
Krankenhaus Waldfriede	Berlin	160	www.krankenhaus-waldfriede.de
Augsburg Hospital	Augsburg	1,741	www.uk-augsburg.de
Johannes-Wesling-Klinikum	Minden	910	https://www.muehlenkreiskliniken.de/johannes-wesling-klinikum-minden
Chirurgische Innenstadtklinik Minden	Minden	24	
Krankenhaus Lübbecke	Lübbecke	459	
Krankenhaus Rahden	Rahden	78	
Krankenhaus Bad Oeynhausen	Bad Oeynhausen	240	
Auguste-Viktoria-Klinik	Bad Oeynhausen	104	
Bundeswehrzentralkrankenhaus Koblenz	Koblenz	506	
Bundeswehrkrankenhaus Berlin	Berlin	367	
Bundeswehrkrankenhaus Hamburg	Hamburg	307	
Bundeswehrkrankenhaus Ulm	Ulm	496	
Westerstede Hospital Center	Westerstede	510	/www.ammerland-klinik.de/ & westerstede.bwkrankenhaus.de/
Helios Kliniken Mittelweser Nienburg	Nienburg	300	
Helios Kliniken Mittelweser Stolzenau	Stolzenau	63	
Asklepios Klinik Langen	Langen	433	
Klinikum Kassel	Kassel	1281	
Helios Kliniken Kassel	Kassel	433	
Elisabet-Krankenhaus Kassel	Kassel	225	
Agaplesion Diakonie Kliniken Kassel	Kassel	362	
Marienenkrankenhaus Kassel	Kassel	195	
Helios Klinikum Krefeld	Krefeld	1153	https://www.helios-gesundheit.de/standorte-angebote/kliniken/krefeld/
Klinikum am Gesundbrunnen SLK Heilbronn	Heilbronn	971	
Luisenhospital	Aachen	378	

== Defunct ==
- Friedrichs-Waisenhaus Rummelsburg
- Holy Spirit Hospital (Berlin)
