= Vivantes Hospital Group =

German hospital group

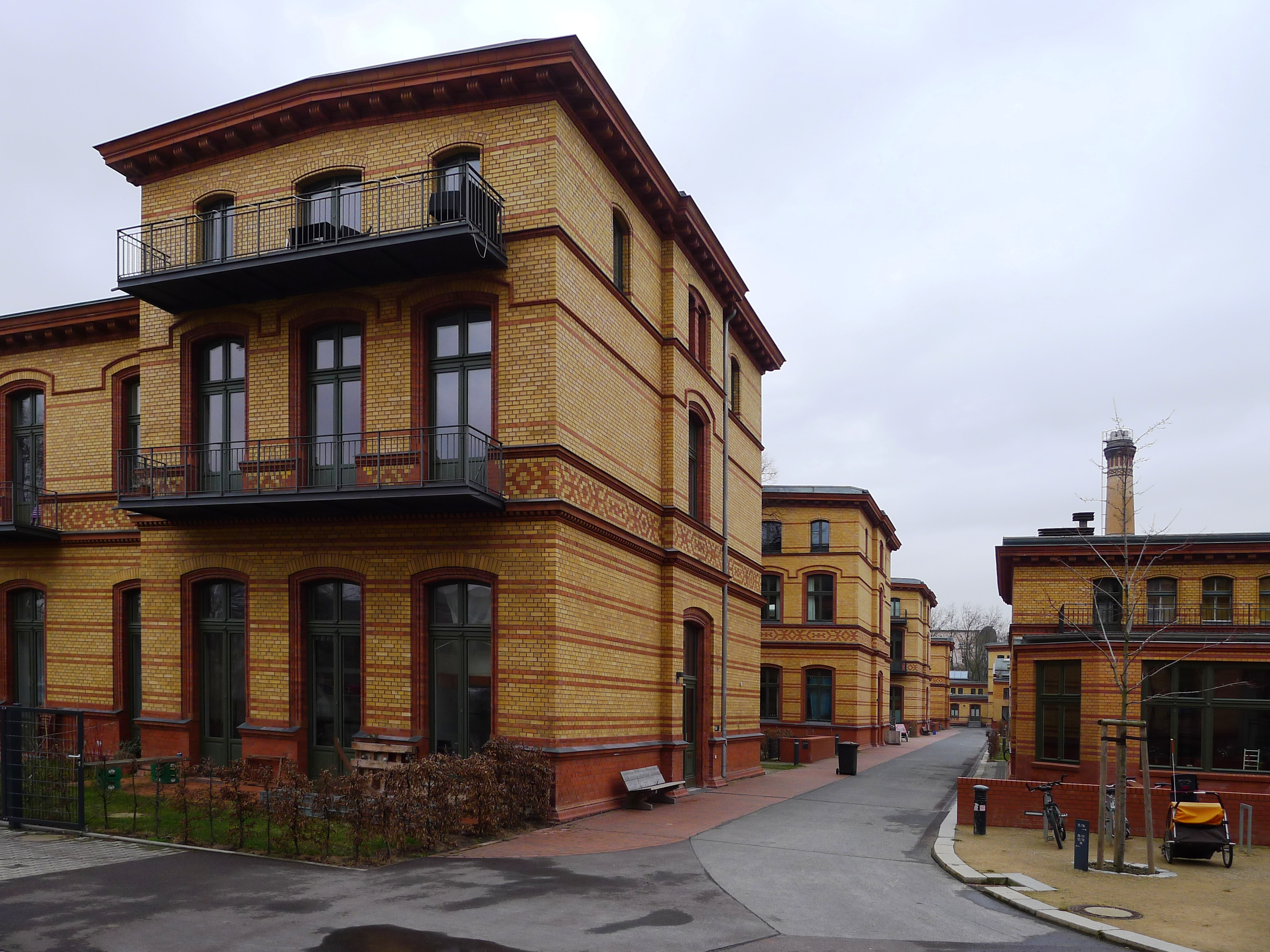
- Vivantes Hospital

Geography
- Location: Berlin, Germany
- Coordinates: 52.494167°N 13.408611°E

Organisation
- Care system: State
- Affiliated university: Charité – Universitätsmedizin Berlin

Services
- Beds: 5,856 (2019)

Links
- Other links: List of hospitals in Germany
- Company
- Founded: 1874
- Headquarters: Reinickendorf, Germany
- Revenue: ▲EUR€ 1.3 billion (2019)
- Number of employees: 17,372 (2019)

The Vivantes Hospital Group is a state-owned healthcare company operating hospitals, primary healthcare centers, nursing facilities, and other medical centers in Berlin. The company runs 10 hospitals with a total capacity of about 6,000 beds and more than 17,000 employees.

== Structure ==
The Vivantes Hospital Group was founded in 2001. The hospital group includes 10 hospitals with around 100 medical departments and institutions, rehabilitation centers, 40 centers of excellence, primary healthcare facilities, 12 nursing facilities, and other outpatient and inpatient healthcare facilities in Berlin. The hospital group has a capacity of about 6,000 beds and more than 17,000 employees, 2,300 of whom are physicians. According to the company, it is the biggest state-owned hospital group in Berlin, providing hospital care for about a third of patients in the city seeking inpatient care.

The hospitals in the group are:

- Vivantes Humboldt-Klinikum
- Vivantes Klinikum Spandau
- Vivantes Klinikum Am Urban
- Vivantes Auguste-Viktoria-Klinikum
- Vivantes Wenckebach-Klinikum
- Vivantes Klinikum Neukölln
- Vivantes Klinikum Kaulsdorf
- Vivantes Klinikum im Friedrichshain
- Klinikum Prenzlauer Berg
- Vivantes Ida-Wolff-Krankenhaus

It runs an international department, Vivantes International Medicine, to coordinate medical tourism, for which Berlin is a popular destination.

The state of Berlin undertook a bank guarantee for 180 million euros in 2011 to finance development projects. The company made a profit each year from 2004 to 2011.
