= Augsburg-Universitätsviertel =

Area of Augsburg, Germany

Coordinates: 48.308°N 10.904°E

Universitätsviertel (German pronunciation: [univɛʁziˈtɛːtsˌfɪʁtl̩], lit. 'University Quarter') is one of the 17 Planungsräume (English: Planning district, singular Planungsraum) of Augsburg, Bavaria, Germany. It consists of one Stadtbezirk, (English: Ward) out of the 41 that make up the city, the 32nd, with which its planning district is coterminous. The Universitätsviertel houses the main campus of the University of Augsburg, which was founded in 1970. The planning district also houses the old Augsburg Airport as well as the Volkssiedlung, (English: Public settlement or People's settlement) a public housing development. The district, with many university students, has a lower percentage of foreign-born residents than other areas of Augsburg, with only 13.1% compared to the citywide average of 16.7%. The Universitätsviertel has an area of 3.96 km^{2} (1.53 mi^{2}), and as of January 1, 2007, a population of 10,824. It is bordered on the south by Inningen, the south and east by Haunstetten, on the north by Hochfeld, and on the west by Göggingen.

== University ==
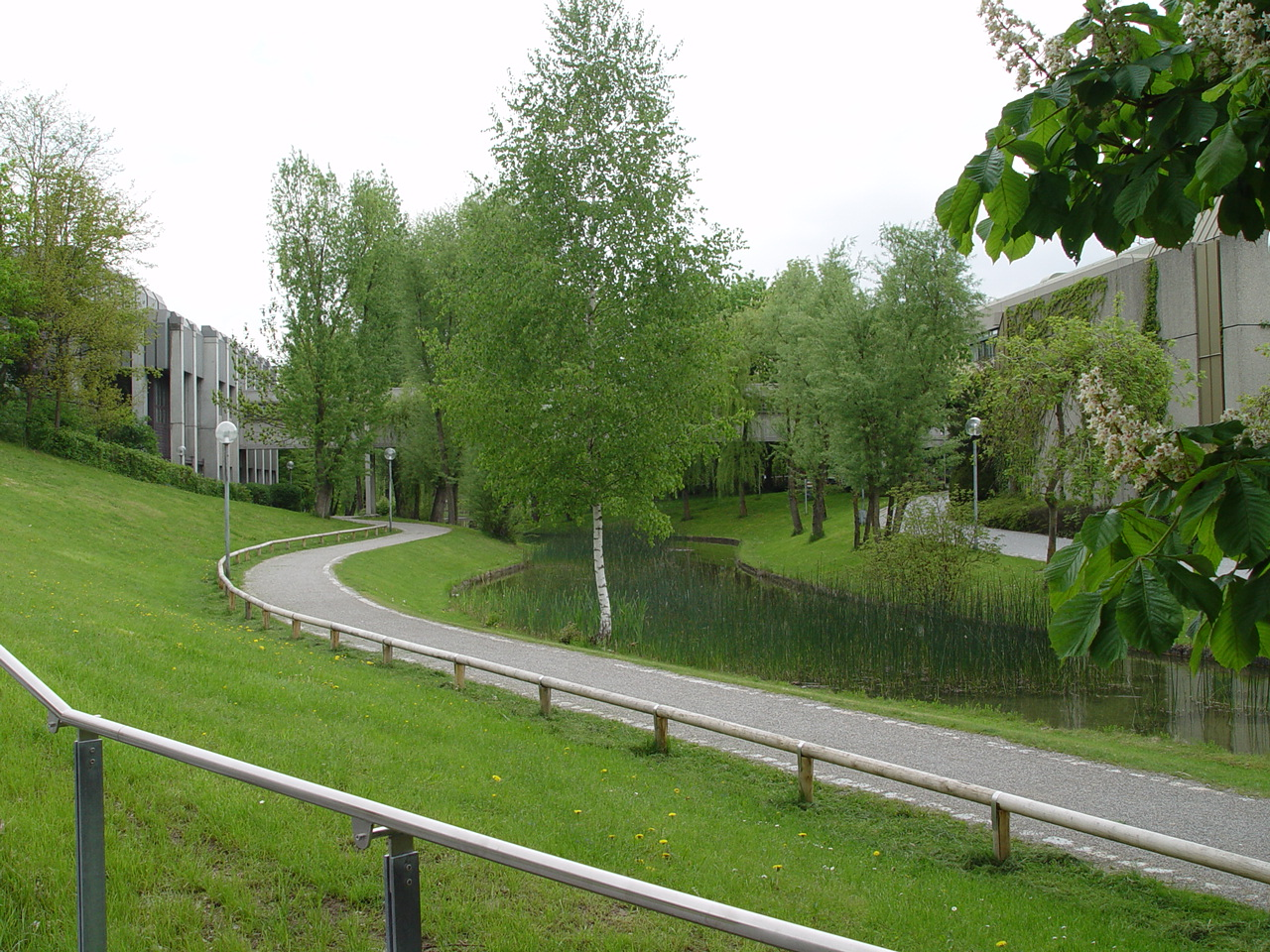
Scene from the main campus of the Universität Augsburg.

The university in its current form was founded in 1970, and is the successor to the University of Dillingen, located in Dillingen an der Donau, and which was existed between 1551 and 1802 and was a philosophical and theological institution under the bishops of Augsburg. After this, the university was also used as the teacher training college of LMU Munich. It was also used as the university for Regierungsbezirk Schwaben. The campus was constructed in 1974 and was given its own small civic division of the city when Augsburg dramatically expanded its city boundaries in the comprehensive Bavarian subdivision reform of 1972. It is the only university in Germany to have its campus crossed by a tram line, upon which there is only a single stop for the university.

The university is organized into seven general faculties. These are the Faculties of History and Languages, Philosophy and Social Sciences, Economics, Law, Mathematics and Natural Sciences, Catholic Theology, and Applied Information Sciences. The Faculty of Applied Information Sciences is the newest addition to the university's faculties. The university enrolls approximately 11,500 students and is not structured in the way many more traditional universities in Germany are. The university concentrates on the social and economic sciences, and has developed several unique areas of study for major German universities, such as Business and Information Management.

== Points of interest ==
The campus is built on top of the old Augsburg airport, which was decommissioned at the end of World War II. A portion of the airfield still exists, and today is home to an environmental organization, a Volkswagen warehouse, and a BMX track. The area also contains four churches, two Roman Catholic, one Evangelical Christian, and one Baptist. The Augsburg Arena is also located in the university Quarter.
