= Wolfgang Weber (historian) =

German historian

Wolfgang E. J. Weber
- Born: July 28, 1950 (age 76); Freiburg im Breisgau, Germany
- Occupation: Historian
- Title: Director of the Institute for European Cultural History
- Awards: Pro Suebia prize (2009)

Academic background
- Education: Berthold-Gymnasium Freiburg
- Alma mater: Albert-Ludwigs-Universität Freiburg; University of Augsburg

Academic work
- Discipline: History
- Sub-discipline: Modern and contemporary History, European cultural history
- Institutions: University of Augsburg; Emory University (Visiting Professor)
- Main interests: Social and cultural history of German historiography, 17th-century political theory, History of princes and dynasties, University history, Middle East conflict

Wolfgang Eduard Josef Weber (born 28 July 1950) is a German historian. He is the director and executive scientific secretary of the Institute for European Cultural History at the University of Augsburg and a professor of modern and contemporary history, especially European cultural history.

== Life ==
Born in Freiburg im Breisgau, Weber went to primary schools and to the Humanist Berthold-Gymnasium Freiburg, passed his Abitur in 1970 and, after completing his military service, studied history, political science and social science at the Albert-Ludwigs-Universität Freiburg from 1972. Following his teacher training examination in 1977, he initially received a doctoral scholarship and went to the University of Augsburg as a research assistant, where he received his doctorate in 1982. Weber habilitated in 1988 in modern and contemporary history.

After various substitute professorships and teaching assignments as well as a one-year visiting professorship at Emory University in Atlanta/Georgia, USA in 1990/1991, he took up his position at the University of Augsburg.

In 2009, Weber was awarded the Pro Suebia prize in Ottobeuren for his initiative and successful acquisition of third-party funding for the preparation of a scholarly edition of the Augsburg Chronicle of Georg Kölderer (circa 1600). The prize, endowed with a total of 20,000 euros by the Dr. Eugen Liedl Stiftung zur Förderung der Erforschung der Bayerisch-Schwäbischen Landesgeschichte (Dr. Eugen Liedl Foundation for the Promotion of Research into Bavarian-Swabian Regional History), is awarded in equal parts to an outstanding scientific and an outstanding artistic achievement.

== Research ==
Wolfgang E. J. Weber, who published under the name Wolfgang Weber until around 2000, has been a specialist in the social and cultural history of 19th and 20th century German Geschichtswissenschaft since his doctoral thesis. Since then, he has been working on political theory and the history of ideas of the 17th century from various perspectives, especially the Latin prints in this field. Other areas of research are the cultural history of princes and dynasties, the theories and methods of historical scholarship, university history and the history of the Middle East conflict.

== Publications ==
- Priester der Klio. Historisch-sozialwissenschaftliche Studien zur Herkunft und Karriere deutscher Historiker und zur Geschichte der deutschen Geschichtswissenschaft 1800–1970. Lang, Frankfurt among others 1984, ISBN 3-8204-7435-8 (Europäische Hochschulschriften series 3, vol. 216).
- Biographisches Lexikon zur Geschichtswissenschaft in Deutschland, Österreich und der Schweiz. Die Lehrstuhlinhaber von den Anfängen des Faches bis 1970. Lang, Frankfurt among others 1984, ISBN 3-8204-8005-6.
- Die USA und Israel. Zur Geschichte und Gegenwart einer politischen Symbiose. Steiner, Stuttgart 1991, ISBN 3-515-05966-0.
- Prudentia gubernatoria. Studien zur Herrschaftslehre in der deutschen Politischen Wissenschaft des 17. Jahrhunderts. Niemeyer, Tübingen 1992, ISBN 3-484-16504-9 (Studia Augustana, vol. 4).
- Caspar Thurmann: Bibliotheca statistica. Politik, Staatsrecht und Zeitgeschichte in einer frühneuzeitlichen Bibliographie raisonné. Editor and eingel von Wolfgang Weber, Vögel Munich 2000, ISBN 3-89650-082-1 (Nachdruck der Ausgabe Halle 1701).
- Geschichte der europäischen Universität. Kohlhammer Verlag, Stuttgart 2002, ISBN 3-17-016482-1 (Inhalt, PDF, 55 KB).
- (edited with Philipp Gassert, Günther Kronenbitter, Stefan Paulus): Augsburg und Amerika. Aneignungen und globale Verflechtungen in einer Stadt (Documenta Augustana. Volume 24). Wißner, Augsburg 2013, ISBN 978-3-89639-967-0.
