= Sabine Doering-Manteuffel =

German university teacher

Sabine Doering-Manteufful
- Born: Sabine Künsting; Bonn
- Occupation: Ethnologist

Sabine Doering-Manteuffel (born Sabine Künsting) is a German ethnologist. On 1 October 2011 she became the first woman to accept the appointment as president (university rector) of the University of Augsburg. She thereby became the first president/rector of a university in Bavaria.

== Biography ==
Sabine Künsting was born and grew up in Bonn, which at that time was the "provisional capital" of the Federal Republic of Germany. After completing her schooling she undertook an internship at the newly opened Romano-Germanic Museum down-river in Cologne, as a preparation for studying classics at university.

Partly as a result of her experiences at the museum she instead chose to study ethnology, philology, political sciences and history at the Universities of Cologne and Bonn. It was at Cologne that she met Peter Tschohl, with whom she subsequently teamed up. It was from Cologne that in 1984 she received her doctorate.

The focus of her academic studies at this time was on the nomadic hunter culture of the far north and on African societies. Between 1984 and 1989 she was based at the University of Bonn as a research assistant.

In 1987, she took a term as a visiting scholar at the Memorial University of Newfoundland (St. John's campus) in Canada. The next year she was in receipt of a post-doctoral bursary from the "Maison des Sciences de l'Homme" in Paris. She obtained her habilitation from the University of Mainz in 1993, with financial supported from the DFG: two years later accepted a teaching chair at Augsburg.

In 1999 she became a guest professor at the University of Pittsburgh Center for West European Studies, and in 2003 (in combination with an associate directorship of studies) at the Paris "Maison des Sciences de l’Homme". There have been numerous other study visits in North America, Mexico and Israel. Between 2008 and 2011 she served as dean of the Faculty of History and Philology at Augsburg. This was followed by her election as university president on 8 June 2011 in succession to Wilfried Bottke, the appointment taking effect in October of that year.

Her book, Das Okkulte, appeared in 2008 and won for her the "Prize for the Promotion of the Translation of Humanities Literature" ("Preis zur Förderung der Übersetzung geisteswissenschaftlicher Literatur") from (jointly) the Fritz Thyssen Foundation, the German Book-trade Exchange ("Börsenverein des Deutschen Buchhandels") and the German Foreign Ministry. The book addresses the contemporary growth in interest in The Occult and compares it with other manifestations of "Unreason" through the ages, tracking developments from the Middle Ages to the present, in the context of "new media" such as the invention of printing and, more recently, of the internet. She identifies Wikipedia as a "forum for occult content".

== Other activities ==
=== Corporate boards ===
- Deutsche Bank, member of the regional advisory board

=== Non-profit organizations ===
- Augsburg University of Applied Sciences, member of the board of trustees
- German Academic Exchange Service (DAAD), member of the board of trustees (2018–2019)

== Personal life ==
Doering-Manteuffel is married to the historian Anselm Doering-Manteuffel, who recently retired from a senior post at the University of Tübingen. Asked by an interviewer in 2011 about her marriage, she joked that for twenty years the two of them had lived with a long-distance relationship which "everyone" had predicted would cause the marriage to end after two or three years. Such predictions had been wrong, though she volunteered that, despite having taken it on, she had never really wanted a double-barrelled name.

In a panel discussion organised in 2012 by the (pro-free market) Bavarian Free Democratic Party, Sabine Doering-Manteuffel came out as a supporter of university tuition fees as a way to fund universities. (The issue remains a politically contentious one in Germany.)

== Works (selection) ==
- Die Eifel. Geschichte einer Landschaft. Campus, Frankfurt am Main 1995, ISBN 3-593-35356-3 (Habilitation).
- Das Okkulte. Eine Erfolgsgeschichte im Schatten der Aufklärung. Von Gutenberg bis zum World Wide Web. Siedler, München 2008, ISBN 978-3-88680-888-5.
- Okkultismus. Geheimlehren, Geisterglaube, magische Praktiken. Beck, München 2011, ISBN 978-3-406-61220-6.
