= University Medical Center Schleswig Holstein =

University Medical Center Schleswig-Holstein

Geography
- Location: Kiel and Lübeck, Schleswig-Holstein, Germany
- Coordinates: 54°19′50″N 10°08′33″E

Services
- Beds: 2.500

History
- Founded: 2003

Links
- Website: www.uksh.de/en/
- Lists: Hospitals in Germany

The University Medical Center Schleswig-Holstein (German: Universitätsklinikum Schleswig-Holstein, abbreviated as UKSH) is a university hospital, located in Kiel and Lübeck in the German state of Schleswig-Holstein. Its aim is to ensure medical care in Schleswig-Holstein.

== History ==
The University Medical Center Schleswig-Holstein is the result of a merger between the university hospitals in Kiel and Lübeck in 2003. The administrative offices are located in Lübeck.

The UKSH works with Kiel University and the University of Lübeck, whose students in the faculties of medicine and dentistry (only in Kiel) are trained at the UKSH. Both locations have training opportunities for medical professions, such as nurses and medical laboratory scientists.

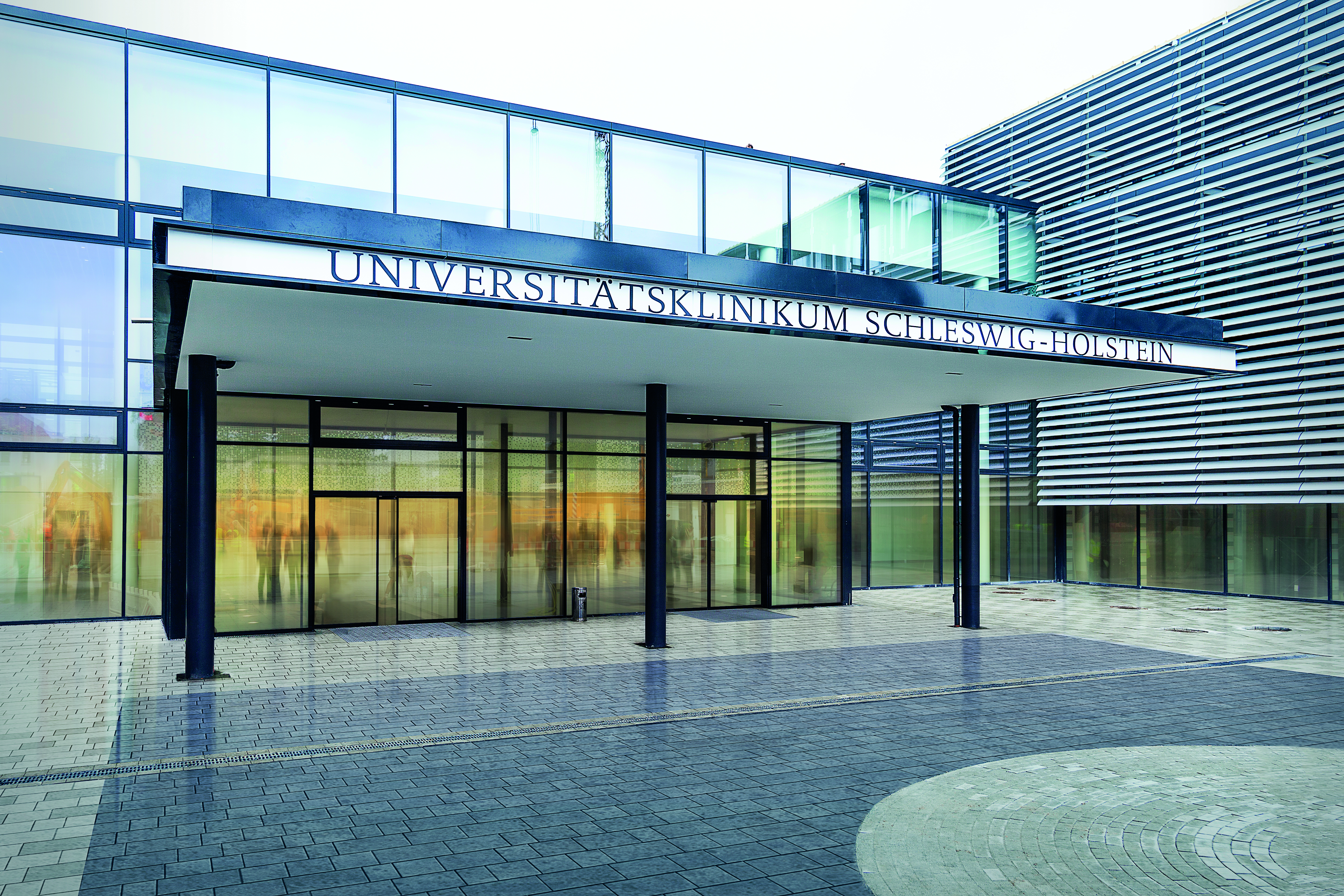
Entrance of building

The Faculty of Medicine at Kiel University was one of the founding faculties of the university in 1665. There has been a medical facility on the Lübeck campus since 1912. University hospitals in Schleswig-Holstein are associated with researchers such as Friedrich von Esmarch, Hans-Gerhard Creutzfeldt and Friedrich Wegener.

Renovation of the UKSH building

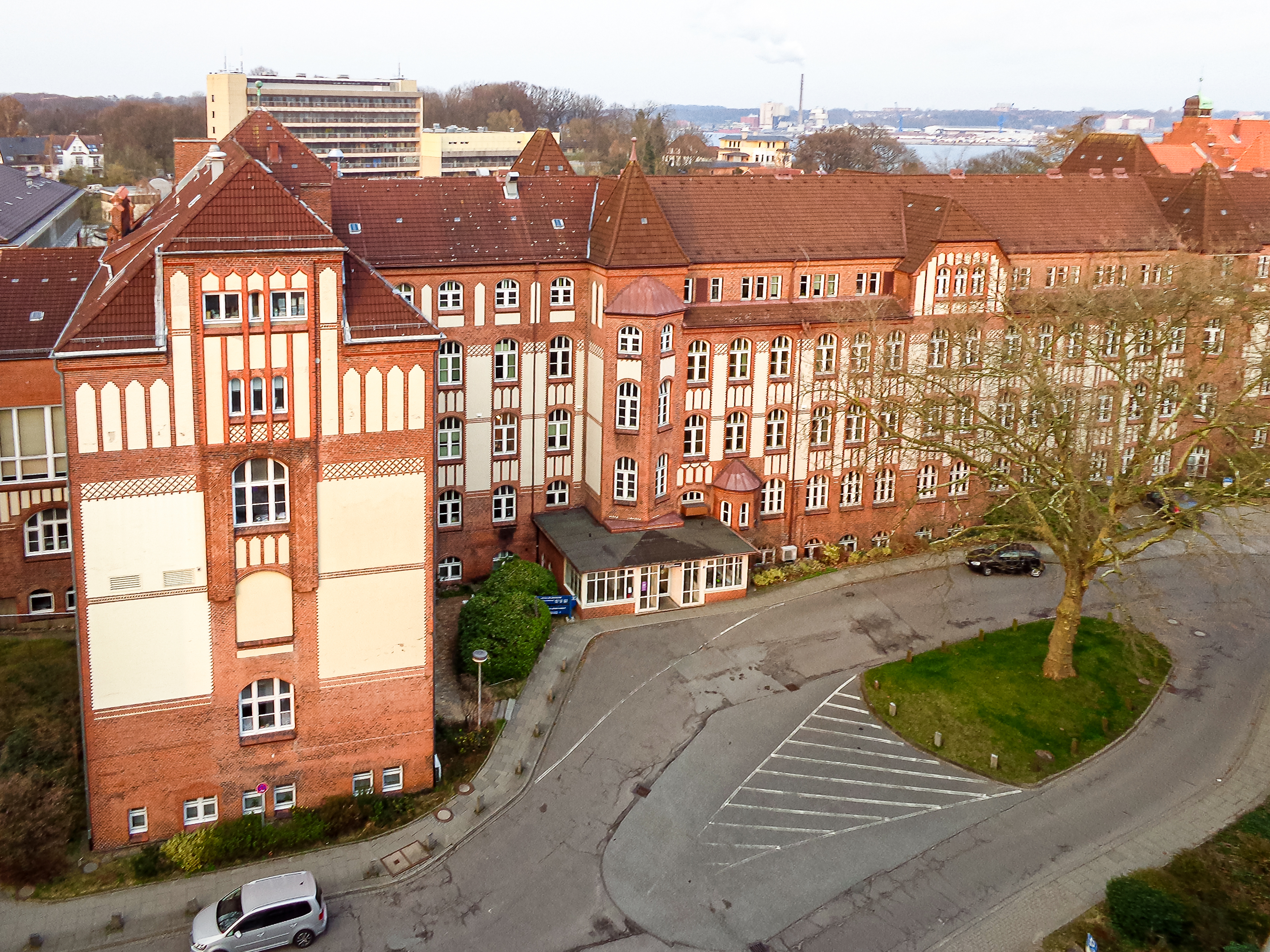
Former building of Kiel Surgery

In July 2009, the Schleswig-Holstein state government agreed to make considerable investments in the modernization of the structural infrastructure on the Kiel and Lübeck campuses. In 2012, the Schleswig-Holstein Landtag cleared the way for a pan-European invitation to bid. To be more precise, this was for building investments, operation for 30 years and an innovative financing model. Investments reached 1.7 billion euros. The hallmarks of the process: The private partner was given responsibility for planning, construction and operation, whilst the State of Schleswig-Holstein remained the owner.

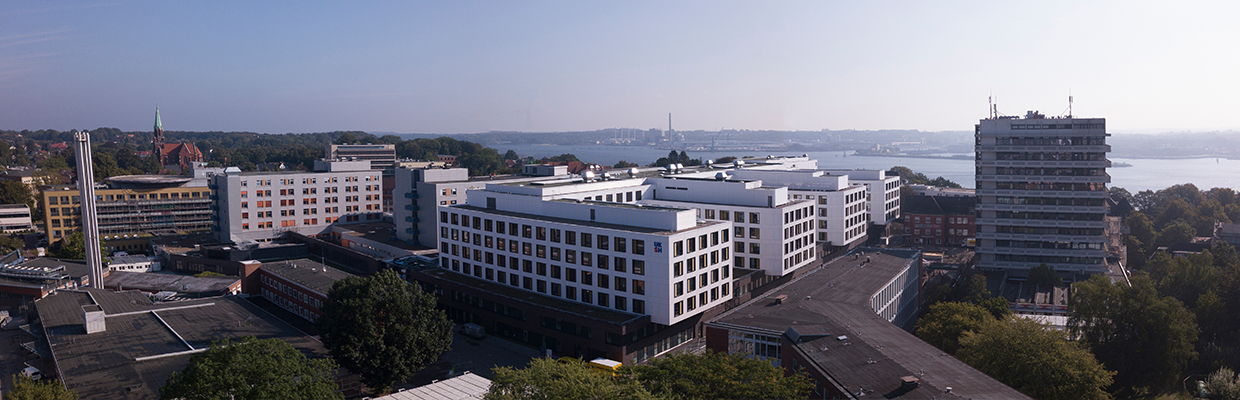
Campus of University Medical Center Schleswig Holstein in Kiel

On 30 September 2014, the Universal Medical Center Schleswig-Holstein and the consortium of bidders signed the structural master plan contract. The BAM/VAMED consortium was awarded the contract. On 30 September 2015, one year after signing the contract, the foundation for the extension building of the existing central clinic in Lübeck was laid. The cornerstone for the new clinic was laid in March 2016. The roofing ceremony was celebrated in Kiel at the end of April 2017. The first patients are expected to be treated in the new building from the beginning of 2019. The roofing ceremony in Lübeck was planned for September 2017, and the first patients should

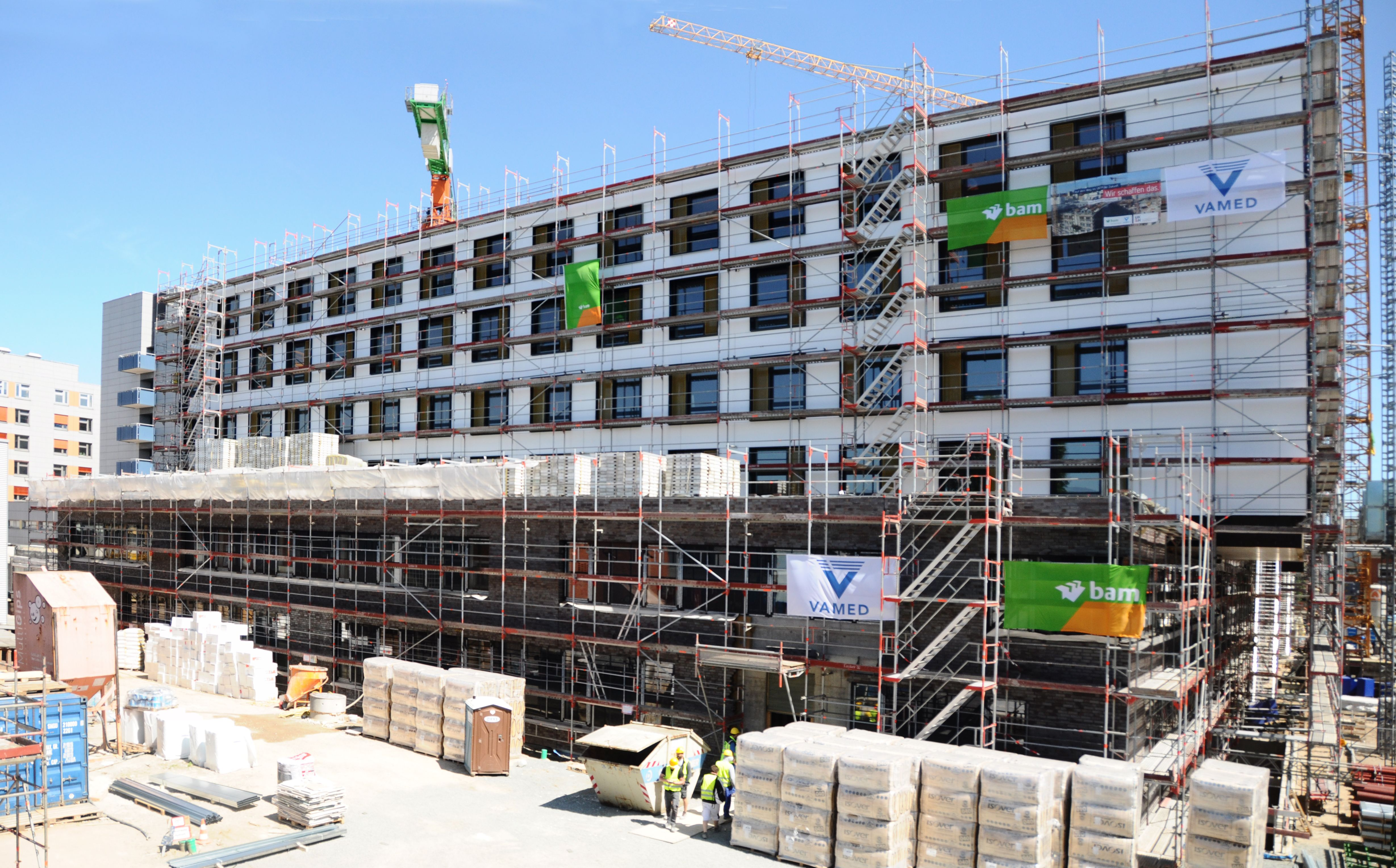
Klinikum der Zukunft Main entrance

be treated in late 2018. Both locations have an interdisciplinary building with improved infrastructure.

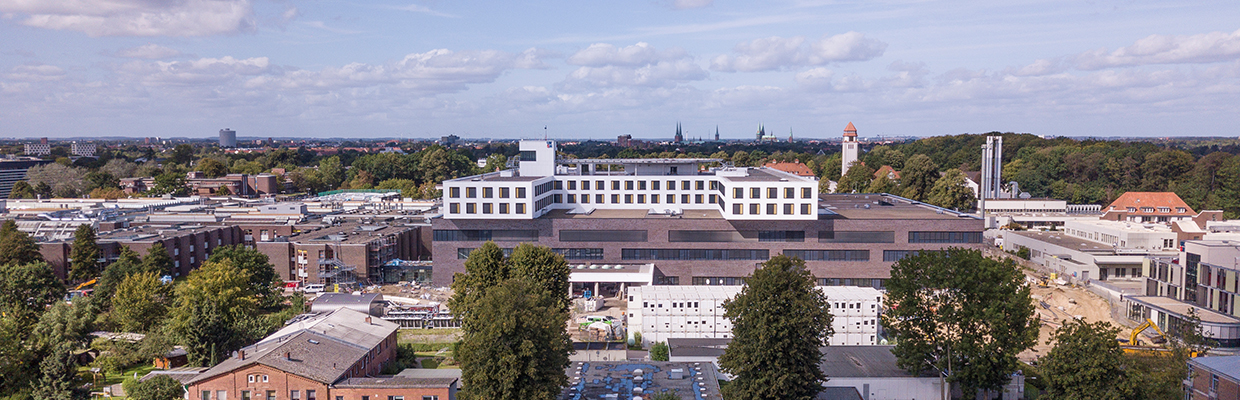
Campus of University Medical Center in Lübeck

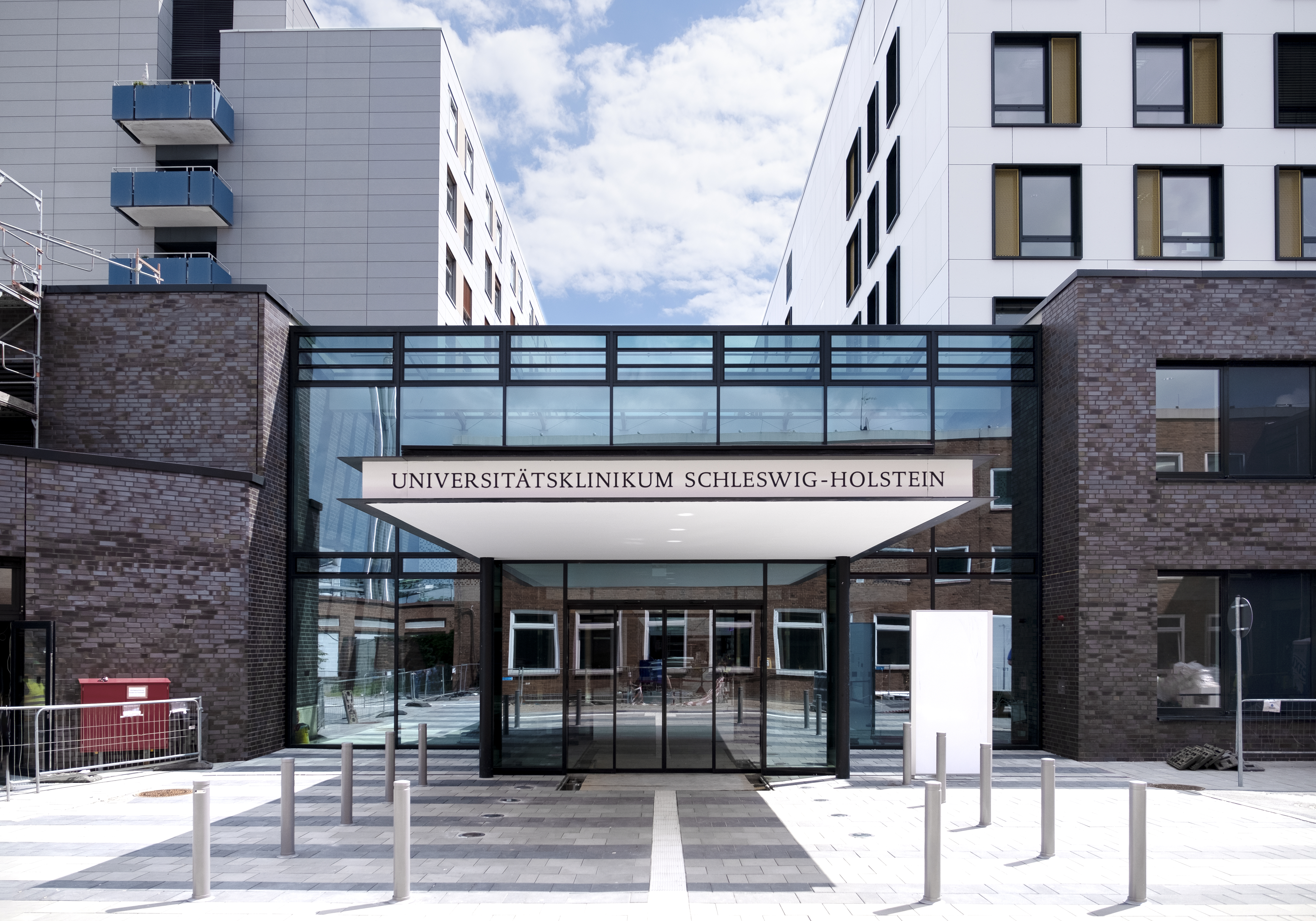
Main entrance of the building

As a result, the central clinics should run more efficiently. The State of Schleswig-Holstein is helping to pay off old debts. 450 jobs will be created from the new buildings and the company agreement on the Wage Agreement for Public Services in the Federal States replaced. The delay in the new building meant fire protection investments for the old buildings had to be arranged, even though these were planned to be demolished.

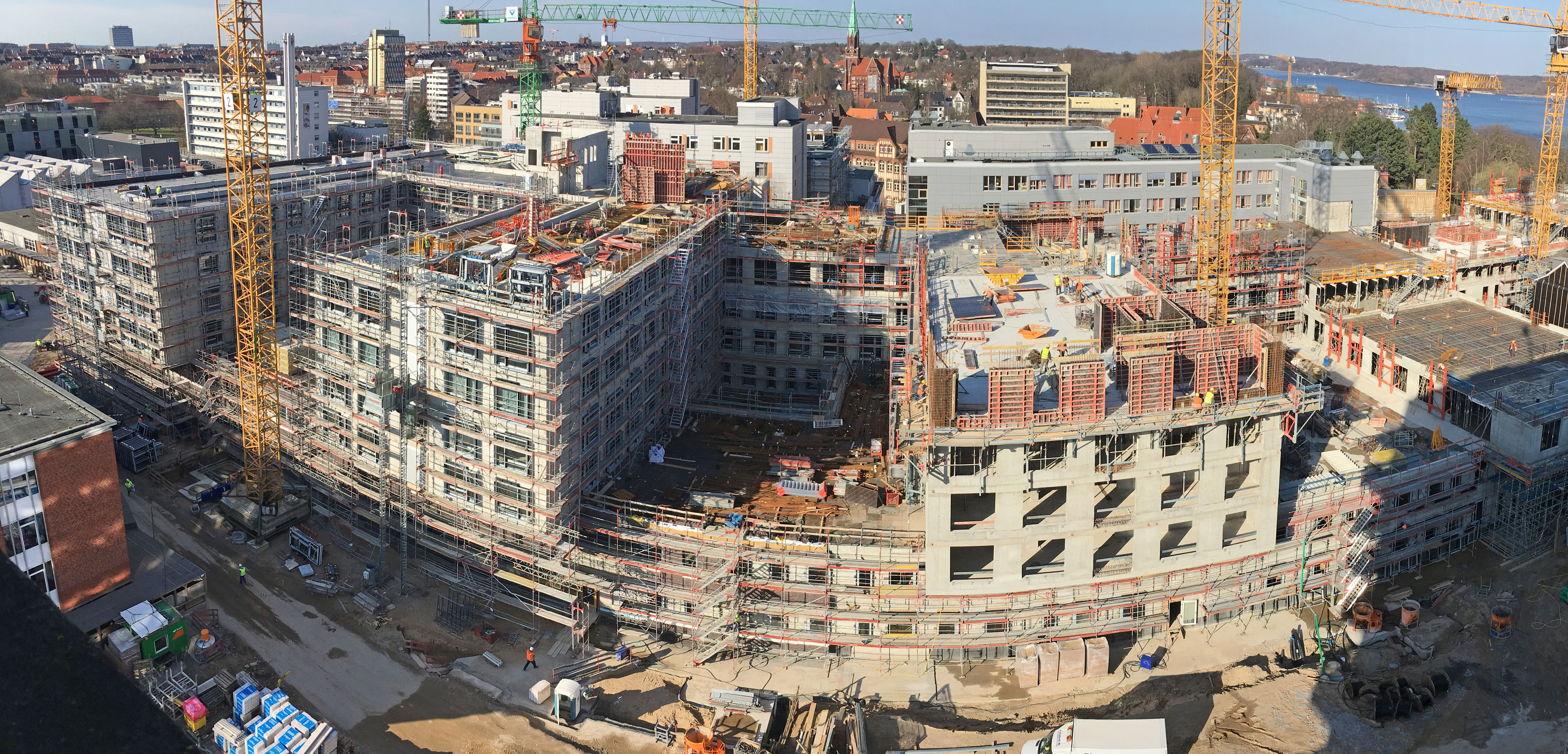
Panorama Campus Kiel

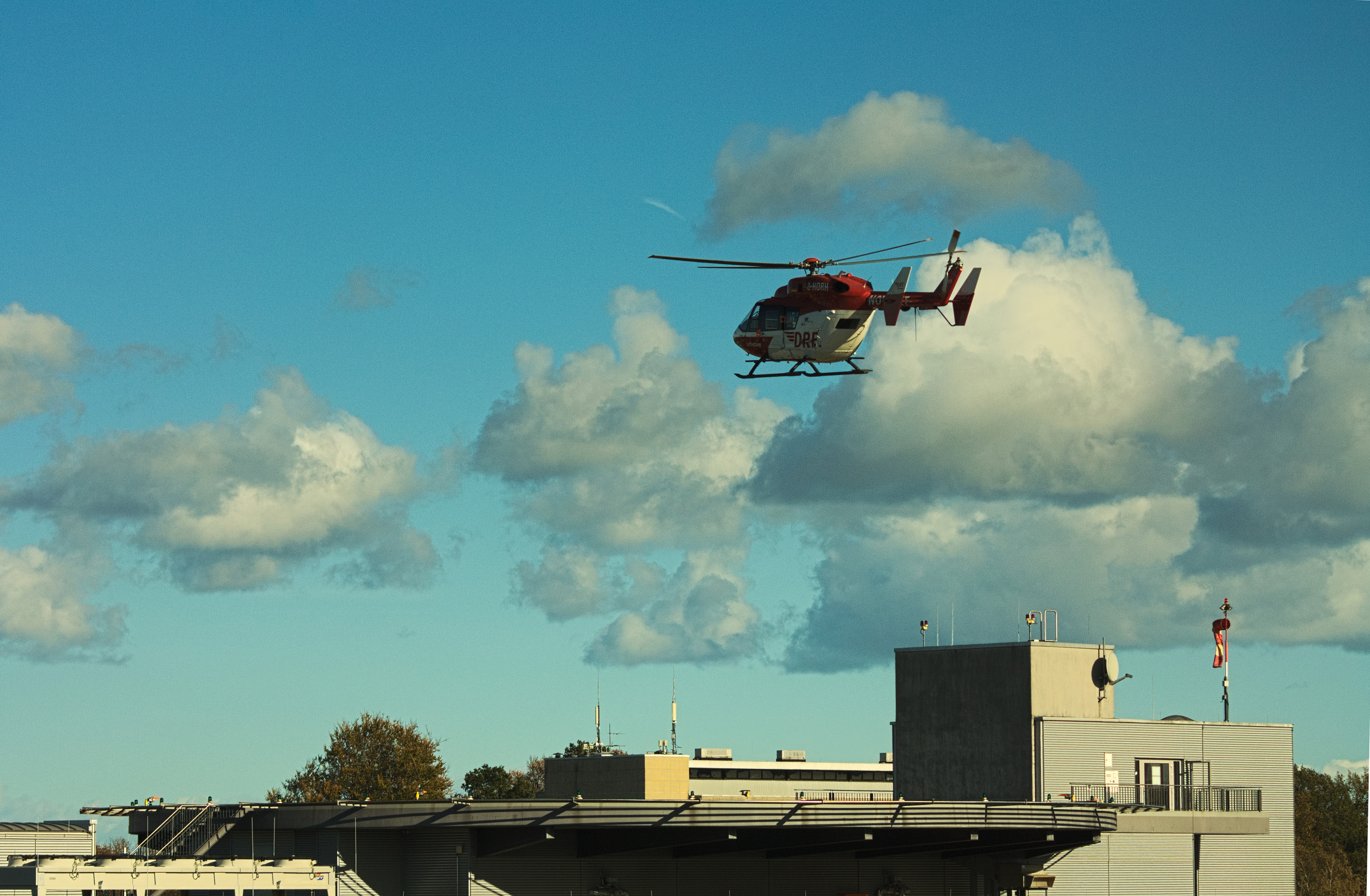
DRF rescue helicopter at Campus Kiel

The UKSH has a heliport with a foam extinguishing system in Lübeck. The helicopters Christoph 12 and Christoph 42 regularly land at the medical center.

Notable people

- Friedrich von Esmarch (1823 – 1908), German surgeon and founder of the German Civil Samaritan Association
- Hans-Gerhard Creutzfeld (1885 – 1964), German psychiatrist, neurologist, neuropathologist and one of two people Creutzfeld-Jakob disease (1920) was named after
- Friedrich Wegener (1907 – 1990), German Nazi pathologist.

Nobel laureates:

- 1950: Otto Diels (1876 – 1954), Nobel Prize in Chemistry (Diels-Alder reaction)
- 1950: Kurt Alder (1902 – 1958), Nobel Prize in Chemistry (Diels-Alder reaction)
- 1922: Otto F. Meyerhof (1884 – 1951), Nobel Prize in Physiology or Medicine
- 1918: Max Planck (1858 – 1947), Nobel Prize in Physics (Quantum theory)
- 1902: Theodor Mommsen (1817 – 1903), Nobel Prize in Literature
- 1907: Eduard Buchner (1860 – 1917), Nobel Prize in Chemistry (discovery of cell-free fermentation)
- 1905: Philipp Eduard Anton Lenard (1862 – 1947), Nobel Prize in Physics

== Participations of the UKSH ==
Zentrum für Integrative Psychiatrie gGmbH (ZIP)

The Center for Integrative Psychiatry (Zentrum für Integrative Psychiatrie, ZIP gGmbH) is a treatment center where patients with mental conditions are examined and treated. Sufferers of mental illnesses are diagnosed and receive holistic psychiatric, psychosomatic and psychological therapy.^{]} The outpatient clinic, day unit and fully inpatient clinics work alongside one another and with licensed neurologists and other clinics. The ZIP is a subsidiary of the University Medical Center Schleswig-Holstein.

UKSH Gesellschaft für Informationstechnologie mbH (GfIT)

Patient information is stored in a protected data center. In pilot projects, complex data ("big data") is analyzed to enable therapies.

Service Stern Nord GmbH at the UKSH

Service Stern Nord GmbH employs 1,500 people in roles such as cleaners, washers and doormen. The partial privatization was reversed again in 2014.

DIALOG Diagnostiklabor Gesellschaft mbH

The UKSH has been working with the Damp Group in the field of laboratory diagnostics since 1 January 2011. The commercial responsibility lies with the Damp Group. The UKSH remains the majority shareholder. The aim of the laboratory collaboration is to increase the efficiency and analysis of large data sets to explain widespread diseases.

UKSH Academy

The UKSH Academy is a charitable company with around 800 trainee positions and approximately 3,000 advanced and continued education participants per year. It offers training in the careers of nurses, health and pediatric nurses (both campuses), midwives (Kiel campus), dietitians (Kiel campus) and radiology medical laboratory scientists (Kiel campus). The UKSH Academy helps to train surgery technology staff (STS) and coordinates the training of medical assistants (MAs) for the UKSH.

In addition to the training program, trainee nurses also have the opportunity to complete an integrated degree in "Bachelor of Arts in Nursing".

In the field of advanced training, around 160 individual courses and seminars, including specific modular programs, are offered on topics such as health management, communicative skills, management skills, dealing with pain patients and wound treatment.

Further education encompasses the fields of operation service, anesthesia nursing and intensive care, psychiatry, oncology, leading a station unit and additional vocational educational qualifications. The trade union ver.di criticized the lack of participation within the workforce and the unconscionable payment of trainees.

The UKSH With 13,594 employees, the UKSH is the largest employer in the state of Schleswig-Holstein and is also a training organization.

Healthcare Hackathon

On 23 September 2017, the UKSH organized a Healthcare Hackathon together with IBM, Cisco and the Kieler Nachrichten. The aim was to program a digital product for the health industry within 30 hours. The Healthcare Hackathon 2018 took place from 13 to 15 September in the Sparkassen-Arena in Kiel.

Internationality

UKSH International (International Department) handles inquiries from abroad, which must first be translated, and processes cost estimates in cases where no health insurance is available.

== Research and teaching ==
The Faculty of Medicine at Kiel University and the Medicine Section at the University of Lübeck are responsible for academic medicine in Schleswig-Holstein. To this end, the UKSH meets the prerequisites for research and teaching with its facilities at both locations in collaboration with the universities in accordance with the Higher Education Act The interplay between interdisciplinary research and patient care allows the latest research results to be quickly applied to therapeutic practices.

The focus of research at the Universities of Kiel and Lübeck at the UKSH lies partially within the fields of "Infection and inflammation", "The brain, hormones and behavior", "Genetic medicine" and "Age-independent mechanisms for the manifestation of disease", "Oncology", "Clinical genome research", "Neuroscience", "Endocrinal management and regulation" and "Biomedical technologies". The "Inflammation at interfaces" cluster consisting of researchers and doctors from both universities is funded by the national and state governments as part of the German Universities Excellence Initiative.^{[39]} Researchers from both medical faculties also play important roles at four Collaborative Research Centers and work with another three. In addition to two graduate schools, three national and one international graduate colleges were able to be established in Kiel and Lübeck. Researchers from both locations are participating at three of the four new German centers for health research: The German Center for Cardiovascular Research (DZHK), the German Center for Lung Research (DZL) and the German Center for Infection Research (DZIF). Around 3,500 human medicine and dentistry students make up the Faculties of Medicine at Kiel University and the University of Lübeck. As well as traditional courses, medical Master programs such as Medical Life Science, Master of Hospital Management, Medical Engineering, Health Informatics and psychology are offered. They have partnerships with 36 academic teaching hospitals and practices.

In nursing research, the UKSH concentrates on patients with chronic and multiple conditions, the link between the inpatient sector and outpatient and rehabilitative care, and the expansion of the clinical roles of nurses.

German Cancer Prize for UKSH researchers

Year	Researcher	Departments and institutes	Campus
1992	Walter Jonat	Department of Gynecology and Obstetrics	Kiel Campus
2011	Alex Hauschild	Department of Dermatology, Venerology and Allergology	Kiel Campus
2013	Alexander Katalinic	Institute of Social Medicine and Epidemiology	Lübeck Campus
2014	Martin Schrappe	Department of Child and Adolescent Medicine I	Kiel Campus
2015	Günter Klöppel	Institute of Pathology	Kiel Campus

== Data ==
More than 80 departments and institutes provide clinical research, diagnosis and therapy. More than 2,000 doctors and researchers – including 342 professors – and 5,400 nurses work at the UKSH. Every year around 500,000 patients are treated, a quarter of all inpatient cases in Schleswig-Holstein.

In 2017, the case mix index was 1,470. If you add the case mix points from both locations, the UKSH would rank second in Germany according to the VUD benchmark.

Unit	Number
Departments and institutes	80
Employees ● Doctors ● Researchers ● of which professors ● Nurses	13,594 > 2,000 2,600 342 > 5,400
Inpatient number per year	500,000
Plan beds	2,500
