= University of Augsburg =

University in Universitätsviertel, Augsburg, Germany

Coordinates: 48°20′02″N 10°53′54″E

- Universität Augsburg
- Motto: Scientia et conscientia
- Type: Public
- Established: 16 October 1970; 54 years ago
- Budget: € 117.4 million
- Rector: Sabine Doering-Manteuffel
- Academic staff: 1,235
- Administrative staff: 2,641
- Students: 20,437
- Location: Augsburg, Bavaria, Germany
- Campus: Suburban, single-site campus
- Website: www.uni-augsburg.de

The University of Augsburg (German: Universität Augsburg) is a public research university located in the Universitätsviertel district of Augsburg, Bavaria, Germany. Founded in 1970, it is a campus university organized into eight faculties spanning the humanities and social sciences, natural sciences, applied computer science, business and economics, law, and medicine.

The university enrolls around 19,000 students and employs more than 300 professors, offering over 90 degree programmes across undergraduate, graduate, and doctoral levels. It is considered a medium-sized German university and has a significant international student population.

== Organisation ==
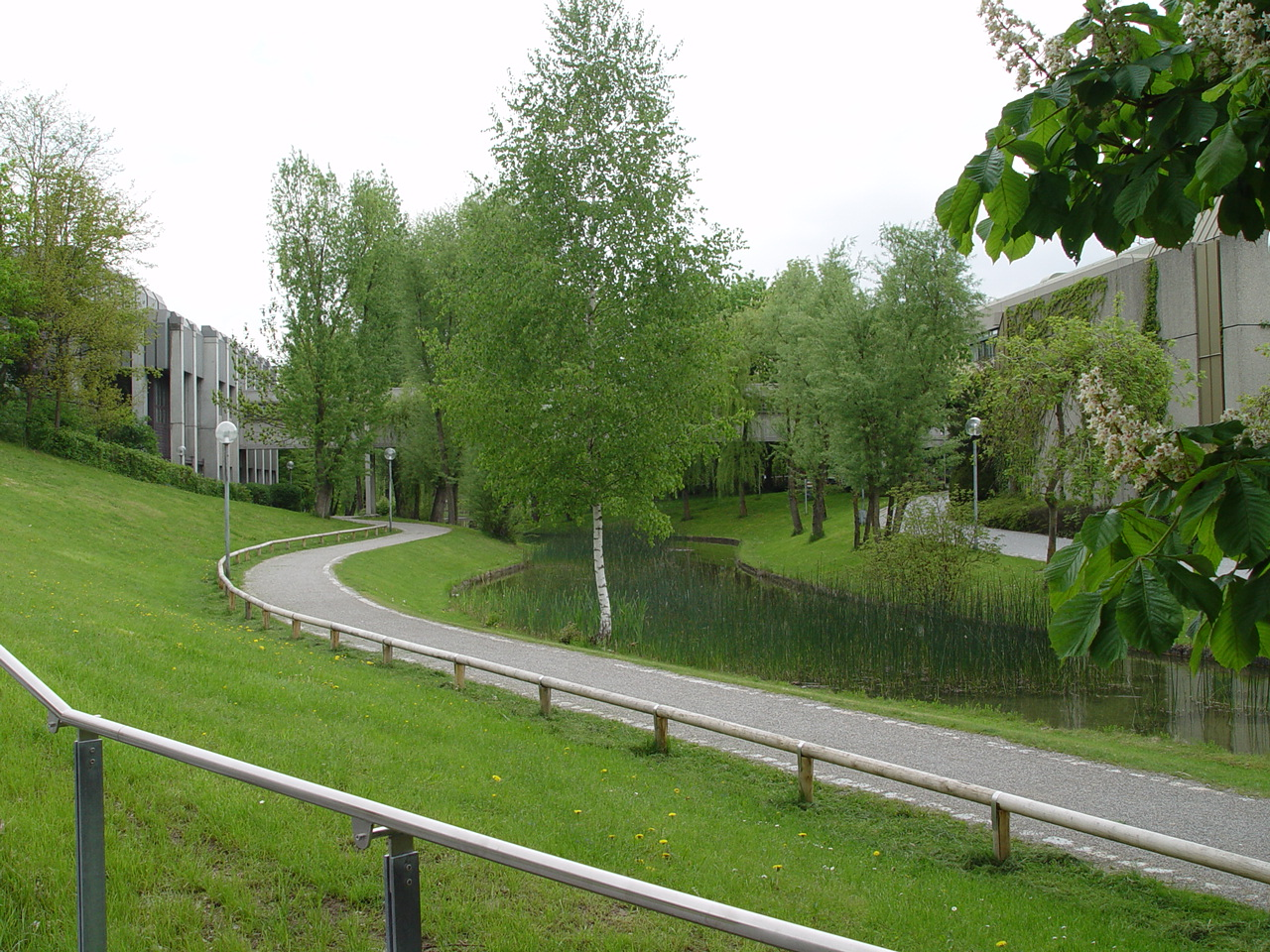
Scene from the main campus of the University of Augsburg

The university is divided into 8 faculties:

- Faculty of Economics and Business (founded 1970)
- Faculty of Law (founded 1971)
- Faculty of Catholic Theology (founded 1971)
- Faculty of Philosophy and Social Sciences (founded 1972)
- Faculty of History and Philology (founded 1972)
- Faculty of Mathematics and Natural Sciences (founded 1981)
- Faculty of Applied Computer Science (founded 2003)
- Faculty of Medicine (founded 2016, in development)

== Campus ==
The individual faculties, the administration offices (including the Student Service Centre), the refectory, cafeterias, bars, and the libraries are all close together. There are a few small off-site locations, mostly in the city of augsburg, as well as a campus in development for the faculty of medicine located next to University Hospital Augsburg.

Augsburg University library consists of the central library plus libraries for social sciences, humanities and natural sciences. It was founded along with the university in 1969 and was at first situated in the ducal residence (Fronhof). In 1970, it was moved to the campus of the old university at Memminger Straße. The new central library on the current campus south of Augsburg opened in 1984. The library comprises a total of some 2.0 million items (as of 2007).

== History ==
The University of Augsburg was founded in 1970. It is one of the new, modern universities in Bavaria, and with approximately 18,000 (October 2012) students it is still of a manageable size. It attracts students from far beyond its immediate catchment area. About 20% of the German students come from outside Bavaria, and at 14% its share of foreign students is larger than at comparable universities.

The University of Augsburg maintains partnerships with the universities of Pittsburgh (USA), Osijek (Croatia) and Iași (Romania), and the Far Eastern State University of Humanities, which is in Khabarovsk (Russia). It has cooperation agreements with over forty universities in Europe, Asia, South Africa, North America and Latin America. The number of ERASMUS exchange programmes also continues to grow. There are currently exchange programmes with more than 130 universities throughout Europe.

Anyone who has studied or carried out research here can keep in touch with the University of Augsburg once they have returned home. "Alumni Augsburg International" is a network for Augsburg students, too, as they can use it to find contacts.

In October 2011 Sabine Doering Manteuffel succeeded Alois Loidl as rector of the university. She was the first female rector of a Bavarian university.

== Professional language teaching ==
The University of Augsburg's Language Centre provides tuition in modern languages. Students of philology receive practical language training in English, French, Spanish, Italian and Portuguese. In addition to this, the Language Centre offers courses specifically tailored to law and economics students, as well as the opportunity to study other languages such as Russian, Turkish or Japanese. Foreign students can improve their German language skills in tandem with their other studies. The University of Augsburg and the University of Applied Sciences work closely together in a joint testing centre for German as a Foreign Language ("TestDaF-Zentrum"), which tests the German language skills of international students.

== Partnerships ==
The University of Augsburg has cooperation agreements with over 40 universities in Europe, Asia, South Africa, North America and Latin America. Particularly close partnerships are maintained with the following 4 universities:

- University of Pittsburgh (United States)
- University of Dayton (United States)
- University of Osijek (Croatia)
- University of Iași (Romania)
- Far Eastern State University of Humanities, Khabarovsk (Russia)

== The 2009 student sit-in ==
On 17 November 2009, over 500 students occupied lecture hall number 1, in an action to draw attention to what they perceived as poor conditions of education in Augsburg and in Germany as a whole. Their specific protest was directed against the introduction of mandatory university tuition fees, and against what they saw as a decline in the quality of German high school education.

They kept the room occupied until 22 December, while using it as a plenary meeting room, holding discussions, organizing theater and concert performances, showing films, and presenting their claims to the university management and the Bavarian state. They agreed to end the sit-in after the vice-president of the university provided assurances to solve the problems that arose within the university's competence.

After massive student protests, all German states eventually canceled their attempts to introduce tuition fees at public universities.
