= University of Leipzig Medical Center =

Hospital in Leipzig, Germany

Geography
- Location: Leipzig, Saxony, Germany
- Coordinates: 51°20′20″N 12°21′40″E

Services
- Beds: 1,450

History
- Founded: 1415

Links
- Website: www.uniklinikum-leipzig.de
- Lists: Hospitals in Germany

The University of Leipzig Medical Center is one of the oldest university hospitals in Germany. Tracing back its origins to 1415, the medical center currently has more than 6,200 employees and approximately 1,450 beds.

== Controversies ==
In January 2013 it was revealed that there had been several irreguralities concerning the allocation of donated organs at the Medical Center. An investigation conducted by the German Medical Association revealed that out of 54 patients needing a liver transplant, 37 of them had had their medical records manipulated in such a way as to speed up the process of obtaining a donor organ. In July 2015, two doctors involved in the scandal were charged with attempted manslaughter.
