= Friedrichs-Waisenhaus Rummelsburg =

Friedrichs-Waisenhaus Rummelsburg was an orphanage and infirmary in Berlin established by Frederick William I of Prussia in 1702. He donated funds for the maintenance of 300 military orphans in 1719. In 1721 400 and 1728 around 500 children were cared for in the hospital.

A new orphanage was built in Rummelsburg and opened in 1859. A workhouse was built next to it after the Prussian law on compulsory education came into force in 1878.

The building was destroyed in 1943 by air raids.

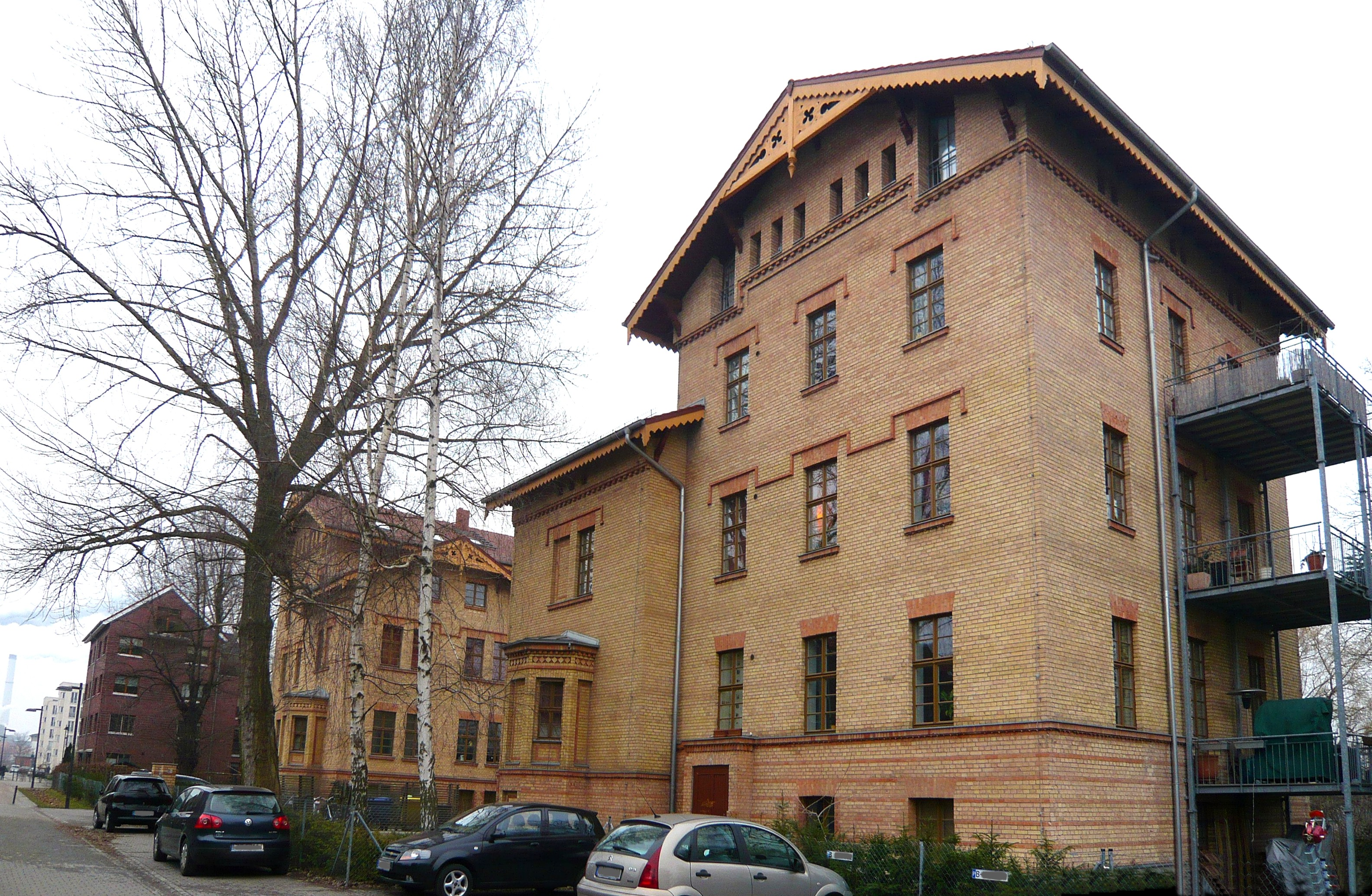
2011-2-17 Rumbrg (13) AMA fec
