= University Medical Center Freiburg =

Coordinates: 48°00′23″N 07°50′16″E

Geography
- Location: Freiburg im Breisgau, Germany

Organisation
- Care system: Private, German public Krankenkassen
- Affiliated university: University of Freiburg

Services
- Standards: all departments: ISO 9001 – KTQ certification.
- Emergency department: Emergency department available (Notfallambulanz)
- Beds: 2,189

History
- Founded: 1457

Links
- Website: http://www.uniklinik-freiburg.de
- Lists: Hospitals in Germany

The University Medical Center Freiburg (Universitätsklinikum Freiburg) in Freiburg, Germany is the teaching hospital and part of the medical research unit of the University of Freiburg and home to its Faculty of Medicine. The medical center is one of the largest hospitals in Europe. Medical services at the University of Freiburg date back to the university's founding in 1457, as the Faculty of Medicine was one of the four founding faculties.

== History ==
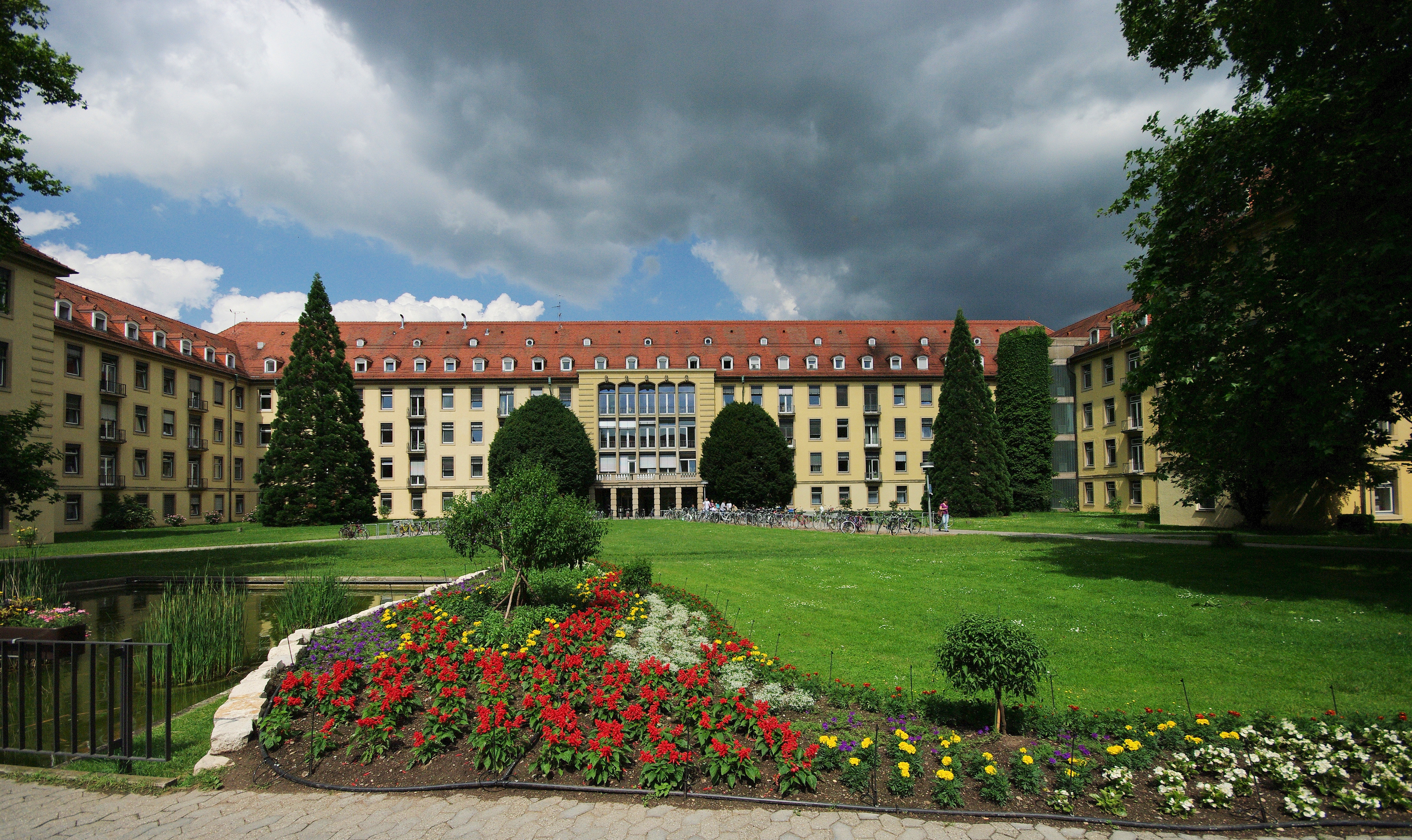
The Department of Surgery

The Faculty of Medicine was founded together with the University of Freiburg in 1457. In 1751, the medical faculty began charity medical activities and the first general clinic (Allgemeines Kranken-Spital) was established. In the 19th century a medical center was built, followed by an entire campus with different specialized departments. In 1887 the psychiatric clinic was constructed. In 1926 the architect Adolf Lorenz began building a modern hospital complex at the present hospital location. During the bombing raid of 1944, almost all medical center facilities were destroyed. In 1952 the reconstruction of the medical center in accordance with the original plans began. Since then, the medical center has continuously expanded and added many institutes and satellite clinics.

== Patient care ==
Today, the hospital has 2,189 beds and treats 90,000 in-patients each year. Around 900,000 out-patients are seen annually. The University Medical Center employs approximately 15,000 people, including over 1,800 doctors and around 4,300 nurses.

As a tertiary care center and major European hospital, virtually all specialties and subspecialties are represented at the University Medical Center Freiburg. There are numerous large centers which bundle resources and expertise in order to provide optimal treatment, among them the aforementioned Cardiovascular Diseases Center Freiburg–Bad Krozingen, the Center for Chronic Immunodeficiency, the Comprehensive Cancer Center Freiburg, as well as the Liver Center Freiburg, the International Pancreas Carcinoma Center, the Neurocenter, the Center for Geriatrics and Gerontology, or the Epilepsy Center.

Aside from the clinics and institutes, the Medical Center also houses extensive research facilities, many lecture halls, and even an own power station.

== Recognition and affairs ==
Many medical breakthroughs have been achieved in Freiburg, such as the first use of the TIPS procedure on a patient worldwide, the first implantation of the artificial heart Jarvik-2000 in central Europe or the first combined heart-lung transplantation in the state of Baden-Württemberg. In 2010, the Medical Center's International Pancreatic Cancer Center was the first in Germany to perform a laparoscopic pancreaticoduodenectomy. All are procedures available only in a select few hospitals. In 2004, the University Medical Center Freiburg became the first clinic in Germany to perform a blood group incompatible kidney transplantation. With over 40 such transplantations to date, the University Medical Center Freiburg is one of the most experienced centers regarding this new procedure. The annual budget of the University Medical Center amounts to approximately EUR 600 million.

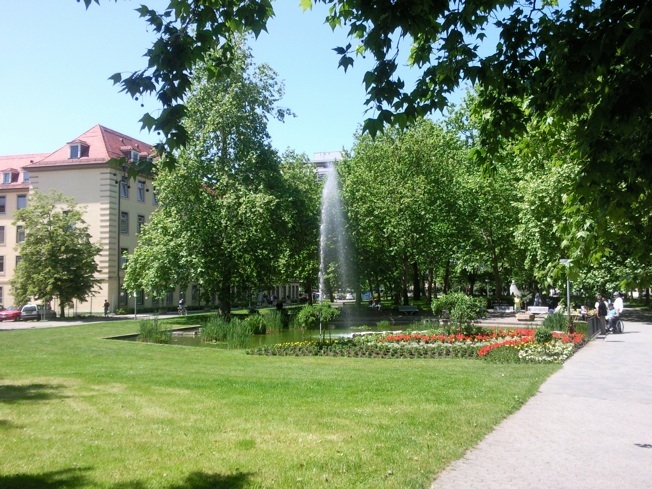
The park at the University Medical Center

In March 2007 the university clinic's Tumorzentrum Ludwig Heilmeyer - Comprehensive Cancer Center Freiburg (CCCF) was named an oncological center of excellence, one of the first four in Germany to be specially funded by the German Cancer Aid.

The University Medical Center Freiburg has recently set up a Center for Chronic Immunodeficiency (CCI), selected to be funded with up to 50 Mio EUR over the next 5–10 years as an Integrated Research and Treatment Center by the German Federal Ministry of Education and Research. In 2010, the Medical Center decided to found a Comprehensive Lung Center with regards to the further increasing importance of lung diseases.

In April 2012 the Cardiovascular Center at the University Medical Center Freiburg fused with the Heart-Center Bad Krozingen to form the Heart Center Freiburg University (Universitäres Herz- und Kreislaufzentrum Freiburg-Bad Krozingen) which has become the largest heart center in Germany.

The University Medical Center Freiburg is the largest hospital to be certified by the (de) (KTQ, Cooperation for Quality and Transparency in Healthcare), the most widespread certification procedure at German hospitals. The aim of KTQ is to make a voluntary certification procedure available to hospitals and to promote continuous improvement and internal quality management. The KTQ certification seal is valid for three years, after which a reevaluation must be performed. The University Medical Center was first certified in 2005 and recently recertified in 2008.

== Education ==
The University Medical Center Freiburg is home to the University of Freiburg Faculty of Medicine, a top ranking German medical school, and is the faculty's primary teaching hospital. The Medical Center also possesses an Academy for Medical Professions (Akademie für Medizinische Berufe) including a nursing school, a physiotherapist school, and a midwifery school.

== International Medical Services & International Business Development ==
International Medical Services & International Business Development (short: IMS) was founded in 2000 by the Board of Directors of the University Medical Center Freiburg. IMS offers services for foreign patients and their families who come for medical treatment to the University Medical Center Freiburg. The services include providing visa assistance and cost estimates, scheduling medical appointments, arranging interpreters and travel plans, processing final billing as well as other services. IMS also provides telemedical services, such as teleradiology, teleconsultations and teleteaching as well as consulting services which include assistance with purchasing medical-technical equipment for hospitals, the conception and planning of hospital and rehabilitation unit upgrade projects. It also organizes workshops, seminars and teleteaching sessions for medical and administrative personnel. The IMS staff speaks several languages, including English and Russian.

== Telemedical services ==
Communication with medical specialists takes place though specially encrypted Internet channels, securing patients' confidential medical data. This service allows patients to get a "second opinion" from a German physician without having to leave their home country. IMS also broadly utilizes this technology for teleteaching.

== See also ==
- List of hospitals in Germany
