= Secundinia gens =

Ancient Roman family

The gens Secundinia was a minor plebeian family at ancient Rome. No members of this gens are mentioned by ancient writers, but a number are known from inscriptions, dating entirely or almost entirely from imperial times, and concentrated in Gaul, Germania, Noricum, and adjacent areas.

== Origin ==
The nomen Secundinius belongs to a class of gentilicia formed from other names using the suffix -inius, indicating that it was derived either from the cognomen Secundinus, or from the nomen Secundius. Both of these in turn derive from Secundus, a name originally given to a second son or second child; Secundinus is a diminutive form. Secundus may originally have been a praenomen, like similar names such as Quintus, Sextus, and Decimus, but in the time of the Republic the masculine form is only encountered as a surname.

== Praenomina ==
The main praenomina of the Secundinii were Gaius and Lucius, two of the most common names at every period of Roman history. Only a few examples of other praenomina are found in the inscriptions of this gens, many of which lack praenomina. Also found are Marcus and Sextus, which were common, and Postumus, which was relatively scarce as a praenomen, although common as a surname under the Empire.

== Members ==
This list includes abbreviated praenomina. For an explanation of this practice, see filiation.

- Secundinia Nepotilla, the wife of Valerius Victor, and the mother of Gaia Valeria Candidida, buried at Cemenelum in Alpes Maritimae in the late first century, with a monument dedicated by her parents.
- Sextus Secundinius, together with his wife, Junia Firmis, built a sepulchre at Virunum in Noricum, dating to the first century, or the first half of the second, for themselves and their children, Mogetius, aged nine, and Sextianus, aged seven.
- Lucius Secundinius Surianus, buried at Flavia Solva in Noricum, aged fifty-one, during the first century, or the first half of the second.
- Postumus Secundinius Maximus, the heir of Tiberius Julius Ingenuus of Virunum, a soldier from the twelfth urban cohort at Rome, in the century of Naevius, who was buried at Rome in the late first or early second century, aged twenty-four years, having served for six years.
- Secundinia Severina, the wife of Gaius Sacretius Spectatinus, one of the duumviri jure dicundo at Flavia Solva, who built a sepulchre for himself and his wife at the present site of Grafendorf bei Hartburg, then part of Noricum, dating to the first half of the second century.
- Lucius Secundinius, an officer in the second cohort of an uncertain military unit in AD 135.
- Secundinius Justinus, made an offering to Jupiter Dolichenus, according to an inscription found at the present site of Zeillern, formerly part of Noricum, between the first and third centuries.
- Secundinius Mercator, buried at Noreia in Noricum between the first and third centuries.
- Secundinius Vibianus, made an offering to the tutelary deity of Noricum at Virunum between the first and third centuries.
- Secundinius Verullus, a centurion in the Legio II Augusta, stationed along Hadrian's Wall in Britain during the middle of the second century.
- Gaius Secundinius Eutyches, buried at Alba Julia in Dacia during the second century, with a monument dedicated by his wife, Vibia Annia.
- Secundinia Paterna, buried at Rome, aged thirty years, five months, in a second-century tomb built by her husband, Valerius Secularis.
- Gaius Secundinius Sabinianus, made a second-century offering to Silvanus Domesticus at Aquincum in Pannonia Inferior.
- Gaius Secundinius Secundus, one of the aediles at Celeiensium, built a second-century tomb at Ivenna in Noricum for himself and his wife, Materna, the daughter of Vibenus.
- Lucius Secundinius Victor, built a second-century tomb at Fanum Fortunae in Umbria for Clearchus, the slave of Lucius Titius Felix.
- Gaius Secundinius Legitimus, a member of the college of Jupiter Cernenius at Alburnus Major in Dacia, according to an inscription from AD 167.
- Secundinius Ursinus, built a tomb at Virunum, dating to the middle or late second century, for himself, his wife, Betautunis, and their granddaughter, Lasciva, aged one year and five months.
- Secundinius Divixtus, one of a number of persons who made offerings to Fortuna at Civitas Alisinensium in Germania Inferior, according to an inscription dating to the second century, or the first half of the third.
- Secundinia Festiva, buried in a tomb byult by Acceptus Senilis at Celeia in Noricum, dating to the second or third century.
- Secundinius Verus, a soldier stationed at Alexandria in AD 199.
- Secundinius Amantius, a cornicularius, or hornblower, in the Legio XXII Primigenia, who, with the permission of his father, Primulus, made offerings to Sol Invictus, Mithras, and Mars at Mogontiacum in Germania Superior, in the latter half of the second century, or the early part of the third.
- Marcus Secundinius Silvanus, a negotiator, or merchant, dealing in chalk from Britain, who made offerings to Nehalennia at Ganventa in Gallia Belgica, in the latter half of the second century, or the first half of the third.
- Secundinius Serotinus, buried at Abodiacum in Raetia, aged ninety-five years, fifteen days, in the late second century, or first half of the third.
- Gaius Secundinius Dignus, made offerings to Jupiter Optimus Maximus and Juno Regina at the present site of Osterburken, formerly part of Germania Superior, in the late second or early third century.
- Marcus Secundinius Vitalis, a decurion in the Ala I Thracum, along with his wife, Claudia Priscilla, and daughter, Secundinia Vitalina, made an offering to Jupiter Optimus Maximus Depulsor at Poetovio in Pannonia Superior, in the late second or early third century.
- Secundinia M. f. Vitalina, the daughter of Marcus Secundinius Vitalis and Claudia Priscilla, with whom she joined in making an offering to Jupiter Optimus Maximus Depulsor at Poetovio in the late second or early third century.
- Lucius Secundinius Severus, together with Gaius Victorinius Fronto, made an offering to the Matronae Aufaniae at Bonna in Germania Inferior in AD 204.
- Lucius Secundinius Favoralis, one of the Seviri Augustales at Civitas Mattiacorum, made an offering to Jupiter Optimus Maximus and Juno Regina at Mogontiacum, in the first half of the third century.
- Secundinia Justa, together with her son, Lucius Septimius Peregrinus, dedicated a monument at Lugdunum to her husband, Lucius Septimius Mucianus, a soldier in the Legio XXX Ulpia Victrix, dating to the first half of the third century. In the middle part of the century, Secundinia, her daughter-in-law, Oclatia Alexandra, grandson, Lucius Septimius Alexander, and cousin, the centurion Marcus Valerius Silvanus, of the Cohors I Germanica in Germania Inferior, dedicated a monument at Lugdunum to her son, Peregrinus.
- Secundinius Amabilis, a young soldier in the Cohors I Flavia at Colonia in Germania Inferior, where he was buried, aged nineteen years, ten months, and twenty-five days, in a tomb between the late second and end of the third century.
- Secundinia Pervinca, buried at Augusta Vindelicorum in Raetia, aged forty-five years, seven months, and twenty-one days, in a sepulchre built by her husband, Gaius Julianius Julius, decurion and quattuorvir, for himself, his wife, and their children, Julianius Julius Junior, Julianius Jucundus, and Julianus Justus, dating to the third century, or the last part of the second.
- Secundinius Tossor, made an offering to Sol Invictus and Mithras at Octodurum in Alpes Poeninae, dating between the late second and end of the third century.
- Secundinius Candidianus, buried at in a third-century tomb at Ovilava, built by Titus Flavius Campestrinus, a veteran soldier, and Julia Exorata, for Julius Exoratus, probably their son, and Candidianus.

=== Undated Secundinii ===
- Secundinia, dedicated a tomb at the present site of Waldbillig, formerly part of Gallia Belgica, to her husband, Gallionius Planctus.
- Secundinius, named in an inscription from the present site of Igel, formerly part of Gallia Belgica, along with his sister, Ingenuia Decmina, and Secundinia Afra.
- Gaius Secundinius Adventus, along with his sister-in-law, Nundinia Severina, dedicated a monument at Colonia to his brother, the chalk merchant Secundinius Severus.
- Gaius Secundinius Amandus, made an offering to the goddess of the Batavi at Juliacum in Germania Inferior.
- Secundinius Attillus, along with Divilla, made an offering to a temple at the present site of Schweighouse-sur-Moder, formerly part of Germania Superior.
- Lucius Secundinius Aventinus, together with his brother, Secundinius Securus, dedicated a family sepulchre at the present site of Igel for their parents, children, themselves, Publia Pacata, the wife of Aventinus, and Lucius Saccius Modestus, together with his son, Modestius Macedonius.
- Secundinia Avita, buried in a family sepulchre built by Aurelius Avitianus at Bonna for himself, Avita, and Aurelius Arusenus Turesus, a veteran of the Legio I Minervia, perhaps his father.
- Secundinius Felicissimus, mentioned in a song inscribed at Tarraco in Hispania Citerior.
- Secundinia Fruenda, one of the heirs of a soldier buried at Colonia, together with Audacta.
- Gaius Secundinius Hylas, dedicated a monument at Lugdunum in Gallia Lugdunensis to his wife, Facundinia Germana, aged eighteen years, two months, and sixteen days.
- Lucius Secundinius Januarius, made an offering to the local goddesses at Colonia in Germania Inferior.
- Gaius Secundinius Julianus, an eques, or horseman, in the Legio XXII Primigenia, buried at Ancyra in Galatia, aged thirty-five, having served for fifteen years, with a monument from his friend and heir, Gaius Seranius Vegetus.
- Secundinia Justina, together with Quintus Julius Severinus, perhaps her husband, made an offering to the local goddesses at Juliacum.
- Secundinius Martius, made an offering to Mars at Colonia Ulpia Trajana in Germania Inferior.
- Secundinia Materna, named in a monument from Dea Augusta Vocontiorum in Gallia Narbonensis.
- Lucius Secundinius Moderatus, together with his comrade Lucius Justius Satto, made an offering to Nehalennia, commemorated in an inscription found at Domburg, formerly part of Gallia Belgica.
- Secundinius Motucus, dedicated a monument at Augusta Treverorum in Gallia Belgica for the freedman Motucius Lupercus.
- Secundinia Paterna, together with Marcus Flavinius Fatalis, made an offering to Jupiter Optimus Maximus at Colonia.
- Secundinia Romana, dedicated a tomb at Augusta Treverorum for one of her children.
- Secundinia Sacrobena, buried at Divodurum in Gallia Belgica.
- Secundinius Securus, along with his brother, Lucius Secundinius Aventinus, dedicated a family sepulchre at the present site of Igel for their parents, children, themselves, Publia Pacata, the wife of Aventinus, and Lucius Saccius Modestus, together with his son, Modestius Macedonius.
- Secundinius Severus, a chalk merchant buried at Colonia, with a monument from his wife, Nundinia Severina, and brother, Gaius Secundinius Adventus.
- Secundinia Tavena, buried at Augusta Treverorum, in a family sepulchre built by her husband, A[...]us A[...]ius.
- Secundinia Ursula, dedicated a monument at Colonia to her son, Severinius, the son of Evalus.
- Secundinia Victorina, the wife of [...]sonius Adjutor, named in an inscription from Germania Inferior.

== See also ==
- List of Roman gentes

== Bibliography ==
- Theodor Mommsen et alii, Corpus Inscriptionum Latinarum (The Body of Latin Inscriptions, abbreviated CIL), Berlin-Brandenburgische Akademie der Wissenschaften (1853–present).
- René Cagnat et alii, L'Année épigraphique (The Year in Epigraphy, abbreviated AE), Presses Universitaires de France (1888–present).
- George Davis Chase, "The Origin of Roman Praenomina", in Harvard Studies in Classical Philology, vol. VIII, pp. 103–184 (1897).
- La Carte Archéologique de la Gaule (Archaeological Map of Gaul, abbreviated CAG), Académie des Inscriptions et Belles-Lettres (1931–present).
- Viktor Hoffiller and Balduin Saria, Antike Inschriften aus Jugoslawien (Ancient Inscriptions from Yugoslavia, abbreviated AIJ), vol. 1: Noricum und Pannonia Superior, Zagreb (1938).
- Anna and Jaroslav Šašel, Inscriptiones Latinae quae in Iugoslavia inter annos MCMXL et MCMLX repertae et editae sunt (Inscriptions from Yugoslavia Found and Published between 1940 and 1960, abbreviated ILJug), Ljubljana (1963–1986).
- Inscriptiones Daciae Romanae (Inscriptions from Roman Dacia, abbreviated IDR), Bucharest (1975–present).
- Brigitte and Hartmut Galsterer, Die Römischen Steininschriften aus Köln (The Roman Stone Inscriptions of Cologne, abbreviated RSK), Cologne (1975).
- Annona Epigraphica Austriaca (Epigraphy of Austria Annual, abbreviated AEA) (1979–present).
