= Eric Breuer =

Swiss archaeologist and historian

Eric Breuer is a Swiss archaeologist and historian.

He studied archaeology and history at LMU Munich, the University of Vienna, the University of Fribourg, and the University of Basel. He discovered the Roman vicus of Eriskirch (Lake Constance), and conducted widespread research on early Medieval archaeology, archaeology of Roman provinces, Avar archaeology, and Mediterranean history. His main interest was the relative chronology of Roman and early medieval times.

== Childhood and youth ==
Only scarce information can be found about his childhood and youth. It seems, that he spent his early years at Munich and the Lake Constance region. Already from early ages he was interested in archaeology. At the age of 8 he discovered an ancient building at the Roman settlement of Argen by unearthening potsherds of samian ware. At the age of 13 he joined the local museum.

== Life as an archaeologist ==
Already before his university studies, he was surprised about the total lack of Roman towns north of lake constance, dure to the massive density in southern region with ancient towns like Taxgaition, Constantia, Arbor felix, Ad Rhenum, Confluentes, Brigantion and Clunia. By analyzing topographical situations of already known ancient towns, he worked out a list of characteristic topographical features of Roman vici. Based on this list, Breuer did widespread archaeological surveys at the region of Lake Constance.

As a result, he managed to discover an (in modern times totally unknown) Roman vicus at river Schussen near today's village of Eriskirch, where buildings with preserved ancient wood were excavated by him.

In 2001, Breuer discovered a slightly separated part of the settlement with pottery kilns, already lying on the eastern side of river Schussen at Mariabrunn, more than half a mile eastern the first discovered pottery area. In 2012, he managed even to localize the Roman necropolis of the first century AD of the ancient village.

Studying Claudius Ptolemaios' Geography, he stated further, that because Ptolemy didn’t realize the sharp bend of the Rhine at Basel, many Raetian towns are located by Ptolemy at the wrong position. Because also some towns like Cambodunum and Abodiacum are presented as being located much too eastern, he came to the conclusion, that there should be a big unknown ancient town called “Drusomagus” located by Ptolemy in the Lake Constance region, corresponding to the more western already known Iuliomagus. Beneath this study on ancient vici, he also did surveys on ancient villae rusticae.

On the field of Early Medieval archaeology, Breuer published a new chronological system, based on earlier works of F. Daim and J. Zabojnik. As it seems, it is based on his thesis about chronology of the Avar cemeteries of Üllő and Janoshida.

Contrary to early eastern European archaeologists, like I. Kovrig and others, Breuer favoured the idea that changes in ornaments and manufacturing of belts are not signs of new arriving ethnic groups in the Carpathian Basin, but simply changes of fashion and lifetime of certain processes of production of goods - and not ethnic conclusions. As a result chronological horizons get at Breuer's work the meaning of starting, increasing, decline and end of fabrications of certain types of small findings.

== Sources ==
- Planck, D. (2005). Die Römer in Baden-Württemberg. Stuttgart. ISBN 3-8062-1555-3. page 80.
- Meyer, M. Ein römerzeitliches Gräberfeld bei Mochenwangen. Fundberichte aus Baden-Württemberg 27, 2003, Reference 11.
- Bilamboz, A. Der Stand der Dendrochronologie für die Römerzeit in Baden-Württemberg. Festschr. Planck. Stuttgart 2009 page 669, 675.
- Fiedler U., [Rez. zu], Breuer, Eric: Byzanz an der Donau :eine Einführung in Chronologie und Fundmaterial zur Archäologie im Frühmittelalter im mittleren Donau-Raum. Eurasia antiqua 19, 2013,175-178.
- Pleterski A., Eric Breuer, Byzanz an der Donau. Arheoloski Vestnik 58, 2007, 464.
- Migotti B., Eric Breuer, Byzanz an der Donau, Vjesnik Arheoloskog muzeja u Zagrebu XXXIX, 2006, 3, 260-262.
- Ungerman, Šimon., Breuer, E: Byzanz an der Donau. Archeologické rozhledy, 2006, 58, 368-374.
- Meyer, M.G.M. Die laendliche Besiedlung von Oberschwaben zur Roemerzeit. Materialhefte zur Archaeologie in Baden-Württemberg 85. (Stuttgart 2010) page 160-172, 281-282, 299-300.
- https://web.archive.org/web/20110531194925/http://eeo.uni-klu.ac.at/index.php/Aquincum
- https://web.archive.org/web/20110531195003/http://eeo.uni-klu.ac.at/index.php/Keszthely_(Kultur)
- https://web.archive.org/web/20110531195009/http://eeo.uni-klu.ac.at/index.php/Pannonien_(Provinz)
- https://web.archive.org/web/20110531195014/http://eeo.uni-klu.ac.at/index.php/Pannonii
