= Secundia gens =

Ancient Roman family

The gens Secundia was an obscure plebeian family at ancient Rome. This gens is known almost entirely from inscriptions, as none of its members held any of the higher offices of the Roman state.

== Origin ==
The nomen Secundius is derived from the cognomen Secundus, originally indicating a second child. The name was probably an old praenomen, but if so the masculine form had fallen out of use by historical times, and is not found as a praenomen under the Republic. The feminine form, Secunda, was used by Roman women as both a praenomen and a cognomen.

== Praenomina ==
The main praenomina of the Secundii were Gaius, Marcus, Lucius, and Titus, all of which were amongst the most common names throughout all periods of Roman history. Other names were used occasionally, including the common praenomina Quintus and Sextus.

== Branches and cognomina ==
There is no indication that the Secundii were ever divided into distinct families, and they used a wide variety of surnames under the Empire. A number of them bore cognomina derived, like their gentilicium, from numerals, including Primus and its diminutive, Primulus, Secundinus, a derivative of Secundus, and Tertius, third, all presumably alluding to the meaning of their nomen. Quadratus, while resembling the numerical cognomen quartus, actually described someone with a square or stocky figure.

== Members ==
This list includes abbreviated praenomina. For an explanation of this practice, see filiation.

- Secundia Restituta, buried at Noviomagus Treverorum in the early second century, with a monument from her husband, Gaius Albinius Asper.
- Secundia, a house-slave named in a dedicatory inscription to Diana Regina at Municipium Montanensium in Moesia Inferior, dating to the mid-second century.
- Marcus Secundius Eutychus, a freedman, dedicated a second-century AD monument at Aquileia in Venetia and Histria to his patron, Marcus Secundius Genialis.
- Marcus Secundius Genialis, a scout in Dacia, was buried at Aquileia during the second century AD, with a monument from his client, Marcus Secundius Eutychus.
- Sextus Secundius Sex. f. Secundinus, one of the municipal duumvirs, aediles, and quaestors at Aeclanum in Samnium, where he was buried in a post-Trajanic second-century tomb dedicated by his client, Secundius Urbicus.
- Secundius Urbicus, the client of Sextus Secundius Secundinus, to whom he dedicated a tomb at Aeclanum.
- Gaius Secundius Sacer, made a libationary offering to Jupiter Optimus Maximus at Carnuntum in Pannonia Superior, dating to the latter half of the second century AD.
- Gaius Secundius Reditus, one of those who contributed to the construction of a temple for Mithras at Virunum in Noricum, according to a dedicatory inscription dating between AD 182 and 184.
- Secundius Se[...]nus, a soldier serving in the twenty-second legion, made a libationary offering to Jupiter Optimus Maximus and Juno Regina at the present site of Osterburken, formerly part of Germania Superior, dating to AD 201.
- Secundius Restutus, a centurion serving in the tenth legion, made an offering to Jupiter Optimus Maximus at Aquae Balissae in Pannonia Superior, dating between AD 170 and 300.
- Gaius Secundius Victor, a soldier in the fifth cohort of the vigiles at Rome, at the beginning of the third century, serving in the century of Gaius Appaeus Verinus.
- Gaius Secundius, a tubicen, or trumpeter, serving in the third legion at Lambaesis in Numidia, at the beginning of the third century.
- Secundius Constans, a soldier in the eighth legion, dedicated an early third-century tomb at Lugdunum in Gallia Lugdunensis to his sons, Constantius Celadus, aged five years and six months, and Constans Celadianus, as well as his wife, Julia Celerina, aged twenty-four years, one month, with whom he had lived for seven months.

=== Undated Secundii ===
- Secundia, a little girl buried at Rome, aged five years, ten days.
- Secundius, dedicated a monument at Ricciacum in Gallia Belgica to his brother.
- Secundius, made a libationary offering to Mercury and Rosmerta at Altiaia in Germania Superior.
- Gaius Secundius, made an offering to the genius of Noricum at Virunum.
- Marcus Secundius Acceptus, dedicated a monument at Lugdunum to his grandson, Marcus Secundius Saturninus.
- Secundius Attianus, together with his wife, Censorinia Matrausus, dedicated a monument at Orolaunum in Gallia Belgica to their son.
- Titus Secundius T. f. Avitus, the son of Titus Secundius Honoratus and Livia Gratilla, buried at Vintium in Alpes Maritimae, aged thirty.
- Secundius Belatulus, made a libationary offering to Mercury at Tres Tabernae in Germania Superior.
- Secundia Carata, buried at Augusta Treverorum in Gallia Belgica, with her husband, Lucius Ansatius Titus.
- Lucius Secundius Crispus, named in an inscription from Augusta Treverorum.
- Lucius Secundius Eleutherus, captain of a small ship, and one of the Seviri Augustales, buried at Arelate in Gallia Narbonensis, with a monument from his daughter, Secundia Tatiana.
- Lucius Secundius Fruendus, a young man buried at Lugdunum, aged twenty-two years and twenty-three days, with a monument from the freedman, Lucius Secundius Reso.
- Titus Secundius Honoratus, together with his wife, Livia Gratilla, dedicated a tomb at Vintium for their son, Titus Secundius Avitus.
- Secundia Julia, dedicated a monument to her mother, Satulla, at the present site of Tresques, formerly part of Gallia Narbonensis.
- Secundia C. f. Julia, the daughter of Gaius Secundius Julianus and Catullia Quinta, together with her brother, Gaius Secundius Paternus, dedicated a monument at the present site of Tresques, to their father.
- Gaius Secundius Julianus, dedicated a tomb at the present site of Tarascon, formerly part of Gallia Narbonensis, to his wife, Catullia Quinta. He was buried at the site of present-day Tresques, with a monument from his children, Gaius Secundius Paternus and Secundia Julia.
- Secundius Mansuetus, a soldier, together with his colleague, Valerius Martius, made a libationary offering to the genius of their century at Mogontiacum in Germania Superior.
- Secundia Materna, together with her husband, Cassius Valens, made a libationary offering at the present site of Putzdorf, formerly part of Germania Inferior.
- Gaius Secundius C. f. Paternus, the son of Gaius Secundius Julianus and Catullia Quinta, together with his sister, Secundia Julia, dedicated a monument at the site of present-day Tresques to their father.
- Secundia Placida, buried at Lugdunum, with a monument from her husband, the sailor Gaius Tipurinius Sacruna, with whom she lived for fifteen years, four months, and eleven days.
- Secundius Primulus, made a donation to the high priest at Augusta Treverorum.
- Secundius Primus, a native of Tubunae in Numidia, was a soldier stationed at Lambaesis.
- Gaius Secundius Primus, a native of Thuburbo Maius in Africa Proconsularis, was a soldier stationed at Lambaesis.
- Quintus Secundius Primus, buried at Thagura in Africa Proconsularis, aged eighty-five, with a monument from his son, Secundius Quadratus.
- Secundius Q. f. Quadratus, dedicated a monument at Thagura to his father, Quintus Secundius Primus.
- Lucius Secundius Reso, a freedman, dedicated a monument at Lugdunum to Lucius Secundius Fruendus.
- Gaius Secundius Saecularis, made a libationary offering at Nida in Germania Superior.
- Marcus Secundius M. n. Saturninus, buried at Lugdunum with a monument from his grandfather, Marcus Secundius Acceptus.
- Secundia Secundina, the wife of Aelius Festinus Junior, with whom she was buried at Comum in Cisalpine Gaul, in a tomb dedicated by their son, Aelius Secundinus, and Aelius Urbicus, the uncle of Festinus.
- Secundius Secundinus, made a libationary offering to Mars Jovantucarus at Augusta Treverorum.
- Marcus Secundius Secundinus, dedicated a tomb at Augusta Treverorum to his wife, Gallia Varicillus.
- Secundia Servata, dedicated a sepulchre at Augusta Vindelicorum for her husband, Julius Macrianus, and children, Alpinus and Alpina.
- Lucius Secundius Similis, a scout, together with his colleague, Titus Carinius Gratus, made a libationary offering to Nehalennia at Ganventa in Gallia Belgica.
- Secundia L. f. Tatiana, dedicated a monument at Arelate to her father, Lucius Secundius Eleutherus.
- Gaius Secundius Tertius, made a libationary offering to Silvanus at Mediolanum in Cisalpine Gaul.
- Titus Secundius Titianus, dedicated a monument at Lugdunum to his mother, Coelia Rustica.
- Secundia V[...], the daughter of Vitalis, made a libationary offering to Mercury at Mediolanum.
- Secundia Victoria, buried at Rome, with a monument from her husband, Gaius Cluturius Filetion.
- Secundia Victoria, buried at Madaurus in Africa Proconsularis, with a monument from her daughter.
- Gaius Secundius Vitalis Appa, made an offering to Anvallus at Augustodunum in Gallia Lugdunensis.

== See also ==
- List of Roman gentes

== Bibliography ==
- Theodor Mommsen et alii, Corpus Inscriptionum Latinarum (The Body of Latin Inscriptions, abbreviated CIL), Berlin-Brandenburgische Akademie der Wissenschaften (1853–present).
- Giovanni Battista de Rossi, Inscriptiones Christianae Urbis Romanae Septimo Saeculo Antiquiores (Christian Inscriptions from Rome of the First Seven Centuries, abbreviated ICUR), Vatican Library, Rome (1857–1861, 1888).
- Bulletin Archéologique du Comité des Travaux Historiques et Scientifiques (Archaeological Bulletin of the Committee on Historic and Scientific Works, abbreviated BCTH), Imprimerie Nationale, Paris (1885–1973).
- René Cagnat et alii, L'Année épigraphique (The Year in Epigraphy, abbreviated AE), Presses Universitaires de France (1888–present).
- George Davis Chase, "The Origin of Roman Praenomina", in Harvard Studies in Classical Philology, vol. VIII, pp. 103–184 (1897).
- Hermann Finke, "Neue Inschriften", in Berichte der Römisch-Germanischen Kommission, vol. 17, pp. 1–107, 198–231 (1927).
- Annona Epigraphica Austriaca (Epigraphy of Austria Annual, abbreviated AEA) (1979–present).
- John C. Traupman, The New College Latin & English Dictionary, Bantam Books, New York (1995).
