= Gallo-Roman Baths of Tours =

Architecture from the Roman Empire

Public thermal baths of Tours in Antiquity
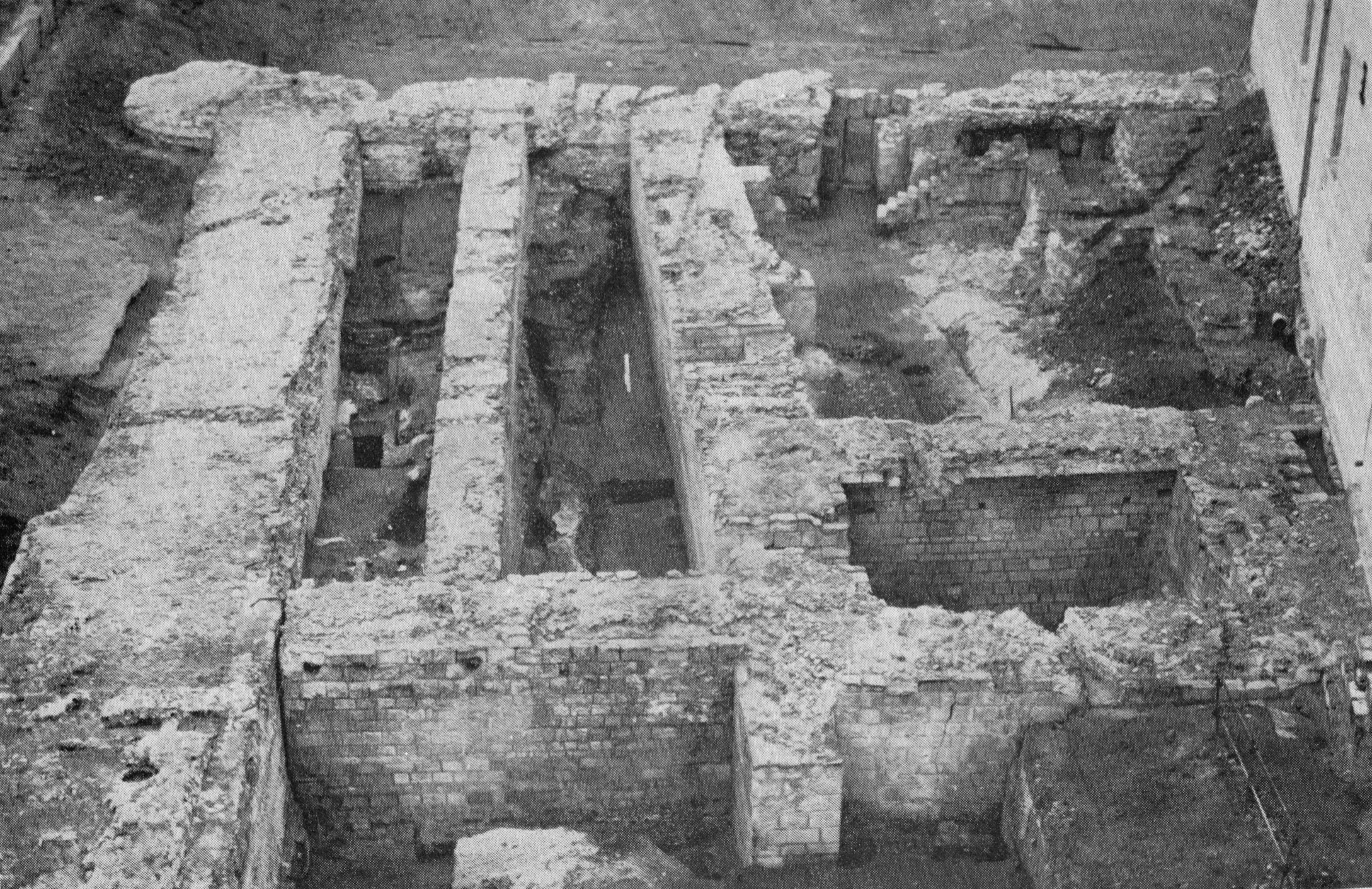
- Remains of the Eastern Baths at the back of the archaeological excavation in the foreground.
- Interactive map of Public thermal baths of Tours in Antiquity
- Location: Tours, Touraine, Indre-et-Loire, France
- Beginning date: 1st century

The Gallo-Roman baths of Tours were public bathhouses that, during the High Empire and for some until the end of the Roman Empire—none of them "survived" beyond that—were in operation in the ancient city of Caesarodunum, which would later become Tours. While these baths had long been widely accepted, their exact location began to be more clearly established in the 1980s.

Two monumental complexes were partially uncovered during excavations conducted between 1974 and 1979 for one, located in the northeast of the open city of the High Empire, which archaeologists refer to as the "Eastern Baths," and between 1999 and 2002 for the other, located in the south and called the "Southern Baths." Although excavations have not determined their exact extent, they seem to be located on the periphery of the ancient city or, at the very least, away from the most densely built-up areas. The Southern Baths were probably situated along one of the main roads of Caesarodunum, while the Eastern Baths were built along the Loire River. One or even two other public baths, of smaller size, may have existed—one to the west of the city and another to the south—but the evidence for their existence is very weak. The architecture of all these bath complexes is poorly understood, as excavations have only revealed a very small portion of their structures. Likewise, the details of how they were connected to water supply and drainage networks remain highly uncertain.

The remains of the Eastern Baths, which have been preserved, were reburied (it is possible to uncover them again in the future), whereas those of the Southern Baths were sealed under modern constructions after archaeological study. The rare masonry structures attributed to the baths located in the west are visible in an archaeological garden that traces the history of the site, which has been occupied almost continuously since Antiquity. The very tenuous evidence of a fourth thermal establishment disappeared after being studied.

== Baths in the ancient city ==
=== General topography of Caesarodunum ===
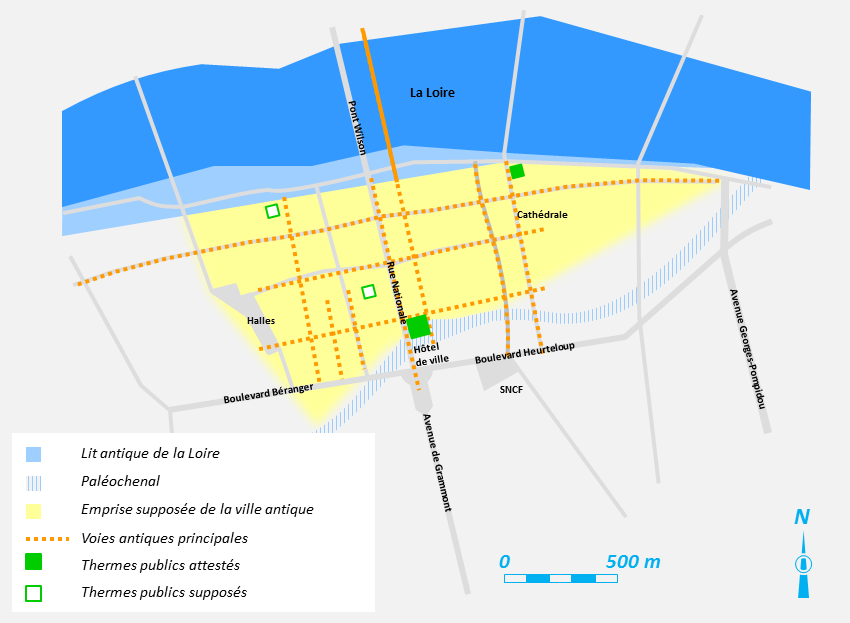
Location of the Gallo-Roman baths and some elements of ancient roadways reconstructed on a modern map of Tours.

The ancient city of Caesarodunum, likely a foundation ex nihilo (Note: Galinié 2007, pp. 199–206) from the beginning of our era, covered approximately 80 hectares on the left bank of the Loire, in the alluvial plain separating this river from its tributary, the Cher, near their confluence. (Note: Galinié 2007, pp. 326–328)

Although the topography of the city remains somewhat unclear, an embryonic street grid has been reconstructed and continues to be refined as new archaeological discoveries are made. The cardo maximus, which has completely disappeared from the modern cityscape, was probably located along the eastern edge of the Rue de Lucé, (Note: Galinié 2007, p. 191) extending from a wooden bridge built over the Loire in the early 1st century. (Note: Galinié 2007, pp. 233–235) The decumanus maximus, running parallel to the river, is thought to be covered by the alignment of Rue de la Scellerie and Rue des Halles; (Note: Galinié 2007, p. 147) it provided access to the amphitheater east of the city.

Near the intersection of these major axes stood the grand Gallo-Roman temple of Tours, as well as, most likely, the forum, although its exact location remains unknown.

Within this perimeter, urbanization appears to have been uneven, probably denser along the Loire. However, excavations conducted in 2006 and 2007, which were still being analyzed as of 2015, suggest the presence of a southern district in the ancient city with several contiguous domus accompanied by gardens, arranged in a well-defined parcel layout.

The presence of one or more public bath complexes in Caesarodunum has been hypothesized since the 19th century, by analogy with most other ancient cities. However, their location remained unknown for a long time. Until around 1850, historians believed they were located behind the cathedral, but the remains in that area were later identified as belonging to the amphitheater. (Note: Galinié 2007, p. 239)

=== Water supply and drainage systems ===
The water supply systems of Caesarodunum, particularly those intended for public use, have only recently begun to be understood, and likely in an incomplete manner. The most significant feature appears to be the Fontenay aqueduct, known since the 19th century, which transported water from multiple springs located 25 km east of Tours and probably entered the city from the south. (Note: Galinié 2007, pp. 335–336)

In 2003, an excavation site identified the position of the left bank of the Loire during the High Empire. At this site, an aqueduct perpendicular to the Loire, heading south toward the city center, was discovered. This aqueduct was fed by a noria that drew water from the river. However, this system appears to have had a relatively short lifespan, lasting only a few decades in the 1st century; (Note: Galinié 2007, pp. 171–175) it may have been a source of non-potable water intended for the city's artisanal activities. Nothing is known about the water distribution networks within the city that might have extended from the aqueducts.

As for drainage systems, gutters or sewers that could have evacuated wastewater from the baths have only been identified, as of the 21st century, at the Eastern Baths, and even then, only in their immediate vicinity. In the broader city, only two sections of a possible cloaca (large sewer), oriented north-south and possibly emptying into the Loire, were uncovered in the first half of the 20th century, but no link between this structure and the bathhouses has been established.

== Southern baths ==
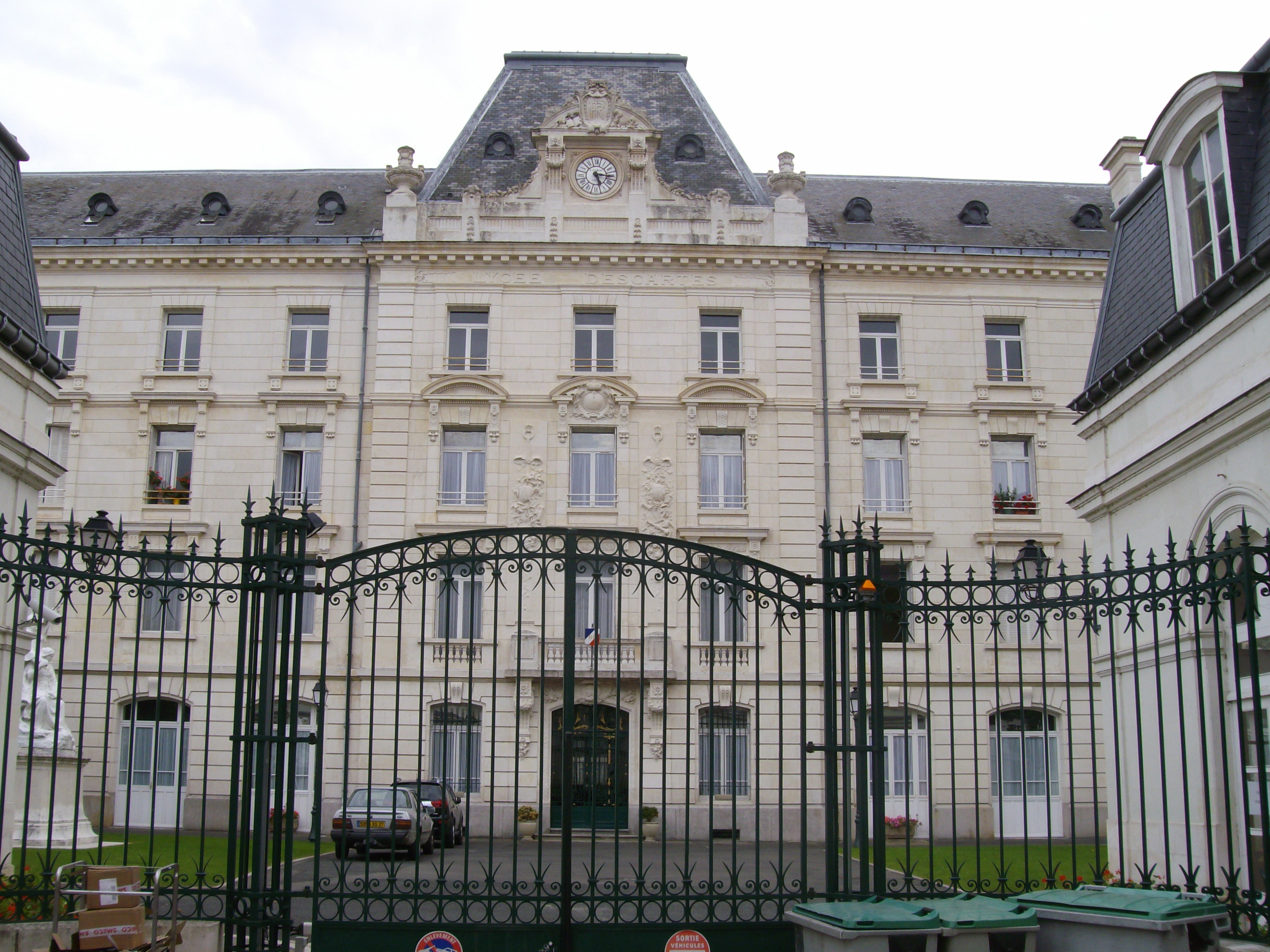
The excavated site is out of frame, on the right of the image.

Between 1999 and 2002, reconstruction work within the grounds of the Descartes High School led the French National Institute for Preventive Archaeological Research (INRAP) to conduct a preventive excavation operation. This consisted of six separate digs across the 1,000 m² affected by the reconstruction project. (Note: The Descartes High School in Tours occupies the entire western portion of the block bordered by Rue de la Préfecture and Rue des Minimes on one side and Rue Nationale and Rue de Buffon on the other, covering approximately 13,000 m².) (Note: The coordinates were obtained from Google Maps archive.)

It was already known that this area contained a fossil channel of the Loire, which had been largely filled in during Antiquity. This north-east to south-west oriented channel appeared to mark the southern limit of the urbanized area. (Note: Galinié 2007, p. 159) Therefore, the discovery of ancient buildings constructed within this paleo-channel was a surprise for archaeologists. The site underwent multiple restructuring phases during the High Empire, with each new phase erasing previous structures. Furthermore, it was heavily disturbed in 1939 when air raid shelters were built as part of France’s passive defense efforts. These factors made it difficult to analyze the site. Additionally, the limited excavation area did not allow for a complete reconstruction of the uncovered baths.

=== A chosen location ===
The Southern Baths were located in the southern part of the ancient city, in an area that, while built up, was probably not densely urbanized. During the High Empire, a major north-south road, identified as the cardo maximus, ran along the eastern side of the baths. Another parallel road, discovered beneath Rue Nationale during tramway construction in 2011, likely bounded the baths to the west. Perpendicularly, a decumanus likely ran along the northern edge of the baths, while another to the south, covered by Rue des Minimes, further defined the area.

The chosen location, within the bed of the paleo-channel, while imposing architectural constraints on the foundations of the buildings, may have been advantageous for facilitating the drainage of wastewater from the baths.

The installation of thermal establishments in the peripheral districts of cities seems to have been a fairly common practice in Roman Antiquity. (Note: Galinié 2007, p. 348) In a city where wood still played an important role in building architecture, the outlying position of the baths limited the risk of fire spreading; smoke pollution was also reduced; finally, a large area was necessary to accommodate all the buildings of the thermal complex. (Note: Galinié 2007, p. 168)

=== From restructuring to reconstruction ===
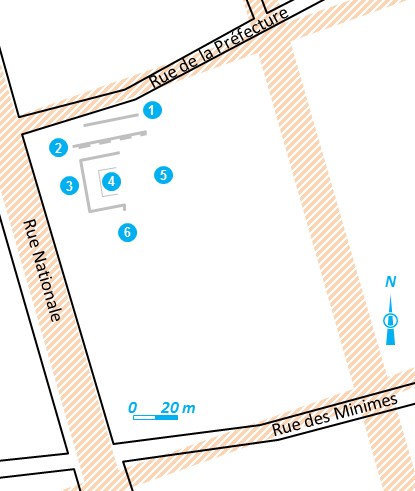
Schematic plan of the southern baths (2nd state). orange hatching: supposed ancient road system. (1) - Boundary wall? (2) - Apsidal wall. (3) - Columned wall. (4) - Swimming pool. (5) - Palaestra? (6) - Palaestra?

==== Before the baths ====
The Southern Baths were not built in an area free of prior human occupation. Final Bronze Age ceramics (900-600 BCE), sealed between two layers of alluvium, were discovered; however, they may have been transported by floodwaters carrying the alluvial deposits. The beginning of the Gallo-Roman period (20-60 CE), which coincided with the founding of the city, has yielded remains of habitations (postholes) and craft activities (bronze-smelting furnaces). (Note: Galinié 2007, pp. 160–165) As early as 1977, a Gallo-Roman archaeological layer had already been identified on the site of the Lycée Descartes.

==== Initial phase ====
During the last third of the 1st century CE, a period that saw the establishment of most known public monuments in Caesarodunum, (Note: Galinié 2007, pp. 325–326) new constructions appeared on the site. However, they were severely damaged by later modifications, leaving few usable remains. The ground level was raised, partially using charcoal, likely for drainage and sanitation purposes. Deep foundations over one meter in depth, set on alder piles, and a wall measuring at least 30 meters long, suggest a public building or complex, oriented precisely in line with earlier constructions. These features, along with the presence of a fragment of suspensura reused in later construction and the attribution of subsequent remains to a bath complex, support the hypothesis that these ruins belonged to an earlier version of the Southern Baths. (Note: Galinié 2007, p. 166) The operational period of these structures was surprisingly brief and precise—approximately 10 to 15 years, between 60 and 70-75 CE. (Note: Ceramics found in the backfill date to the year 60 (terminus post quem), while wooden piles used for later building foundations come from trees felled between 71 and 75 (terminus ante quem).)

==== Monumental baths ====
The following period (second phase of the baths) was characterized by monumental constructions, which were preceded by the systematic dismantling of earlier buildings, the leveling of unused sections, and a new ground fill. Additionally, the orientation of the buildings was slightly altered, possibly to mark a clear break from the previous phase. The foundations of the main load-bearing walls were set on oak piles, which were not force-driven into the ground but rather placed in trenches or individually dug holes. (Note: Galinié 2007, p. 167) A similar method was observed in the foundations of the nearby grand temple. For the Southern Baths, the construction of the walls' foundations took place after 71 or 75 CE, as these dates correspond to the probable felling period of the trees used for the piles, determined through dendrochronological analysis.

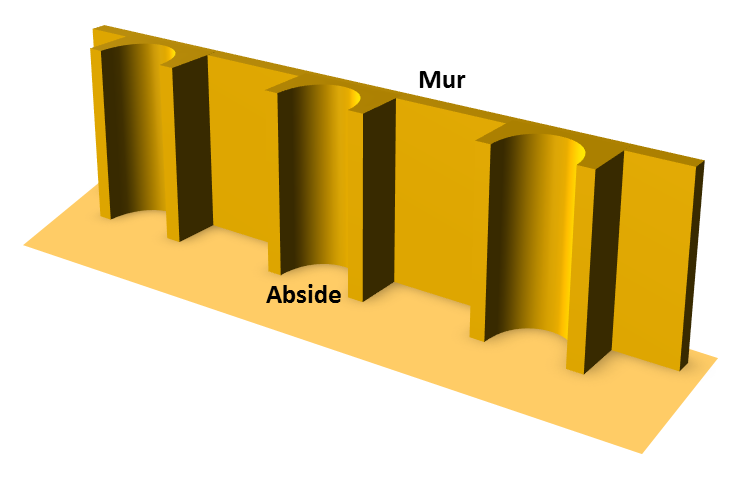
Reconstruction of an apsidal wall. The crown of the wall is hypothetical.

The southern part of the excavated area is occupied by a basin, whose floor is covered with several successive layers of masonry. This basin, identified as a cold-water pool, is surrounded by stylobate walls (supporting colonnades), which seem to define a room or area in which the pool forms the central element. Another wall, apparently enclosing the complex—at least to the north—has been identified. This wall features a series of apses, which may have been used to house statues. Further north, another wall appears to form the outer enclosure of the baths. The complex is believed to extend eastward beyond the excavated area, where it may have included a palaestra. To the south, also outside the excavation zone, lies a vast masonry complex of undetermined function, which could be the section dedicated to the actual bathing facilities. This suggests that the Southern Baths covered several thousand square meters; excavations have revealed only a fraction of the remains, most of which remain buried beneath the Lycée Descartes. Further restructuring work, initially planned for 2004–2005, might have provided an opportunity to learn more about these baths. However, ten years later, these projects had not been undertaken.

A section of the apse wall, one of the rare remains preserved in elevation, extends for 1.50 meters and includes several layers of masonry. This section confirms that the wall facing was built using small limestone rubble with iron-marked joints between the stones.

A mosaic fragment, discovered in 1900 during the construction of the town hall, located just to the south, has been attributed to the decoration of these baths. The fragment depicts the tail of an aquatic animal, possibly a dolphin or a triton. (Note: Galinié 2007, p. 221) Likely part of an emblema, the piece measures 0.25 × 0.33 meters and dates from the 2nd or 3rd century. It consists of more than 4,000 polychrome tesserae and was probably pre-fabricated. (Note: Blanchard-Lemée 1991, notice No. 655) Its discovery site reinforces the hypothesis that the baths extended southward.

A water source, identified north of the baths, may have contributed to their water supply. However, this remains the only fragile evidence of a possible water distribution system for the complex. As previously mentioned, wastewater evacuation may have been facilitated by the ancient riverbed.

==== Abandonment ====
The exact date when these baths ceased to function or were abandoned remains uncertain, based on available studies. There is no evidence of a deliberate dismantling or recovery of building materials. The remains of the High Empire period are covered by dark soil layers, but it is possible that during the Early Middle Ages, the ruins of the baths were still visible and may have even been occupied. Burials found on the site—one of which has been dated between 688 and 880—were placed on top of the remains of the baths. This confirms that by the late 7th century, the baths were no longer in operation. (Note: Galinié 2007, p. 169)

=== Chronology ===
Proposed chronology of the thermal baths of the South

Some dates in the history of Tours Chronology of the thermal baths of the South

The operating period attributed to the first phase of the baths, lasting only ten to fifteen years at most, raises questions. The dendrochronological dating of the foundation piles from the second phase of the baths may not be entirely reliable. The piles may have undergone drying before being used, (Note: However, using green wood as a foundation base in humid areas was a common practice that helped improve wood preservation.) or they may have been felled at that date and later reused in the foundations of the second phase—a similar issue arises with the Gallo-Roman temple of Tours. If this were the case, the construction of the monumental baths in their second phase would have occurred later, in the 2nd or 3rd century, a hypothesis also supported by their architecture and decor (such as the dolphin mosaic). Given the current state of knowledge in the early 21st century, this question remains unresolved.

== Eastern baths ==
The archaeological site containing the remains of the Eastern Baths is located at the southeastern corner of Avenue André-Malraux and Rue Lavoisier. However, it is positioned within the northwestern corner of the Gallo-Roman wall of Tours, built during the first half of the 4th century. This site also houses the Château de Tours.

This archaeological site has sometimes been called the Château de Tours site, but the archaeologists who excavated it more frequently refer to it as Site 3, following the general nomenclature of archaeological sites in Tours. Excavations were conducted between 1974 and 1978. (Note: Site 3 underwent five excavation campaigns from 1974 to 1978, totaling over 100 weeks of work, with 500 individuals participating in the observations. At the time of excavation, digital data recording techniques were not available, but later digitization enabled reanalysis, sometimes yielding conclusions significantly different from the original ones (Galinié 2007, p. 61). Left exposed to the elements for several years, the remains of this excavation were eventually covered with geotextile and backfilled. This measure aimed to preserve the quality of the remains while also facilitating potential future observations or site enhancement.) At the time, researchers had already identified a thermal complex, but they initially believed it consisted of two private bathhouses associated with domus (Roman houses), and the partial publications from that period reflected this interpretation. (Note: Galinié 1978, p. 644) These conclusions were later adopted in broader archaeological studies. However, after a deeper analysis of the excavation data and a revision of the dating—this remains the largest excavation site in Tours in terms of collected data as of the 21st century—these same archaeologists now interpret these remains as belonging to public baths.

=== A site influenced by History ===
This site has been continuously occupied from the Gallo-Roman period to the 21st century, undergoing multiple transformations. It served as the residence of the Counts of Anjou before becoming the Château de Tours. While its occupation in the early 1st century is more suggested than confirmed, its documented history spans from the mid-1st century to the 21st century. Initially, the site housed baths until the end of the Roman Empire, after which civil buildings of unclear purpose were constructed there during the Early Middle Ages. By the 11th century, it became the residence of the Counts of Anjou, who at the time controlled part of Touraine. In the 13th century, this structure was replaced by the royal Château de Tours. The castle was partially dismantled in the 18th century and converted into barracks, with new buildings added. Until the late 1960s, the site remained state-owned but was then divided between the City of Tours and private developers. This site is often cited as an illustration of the theory of continuity regarding locations originally designated for public use, regardless of changes over time.

=== Baths succeed baths ===
==== During the High Empire ====
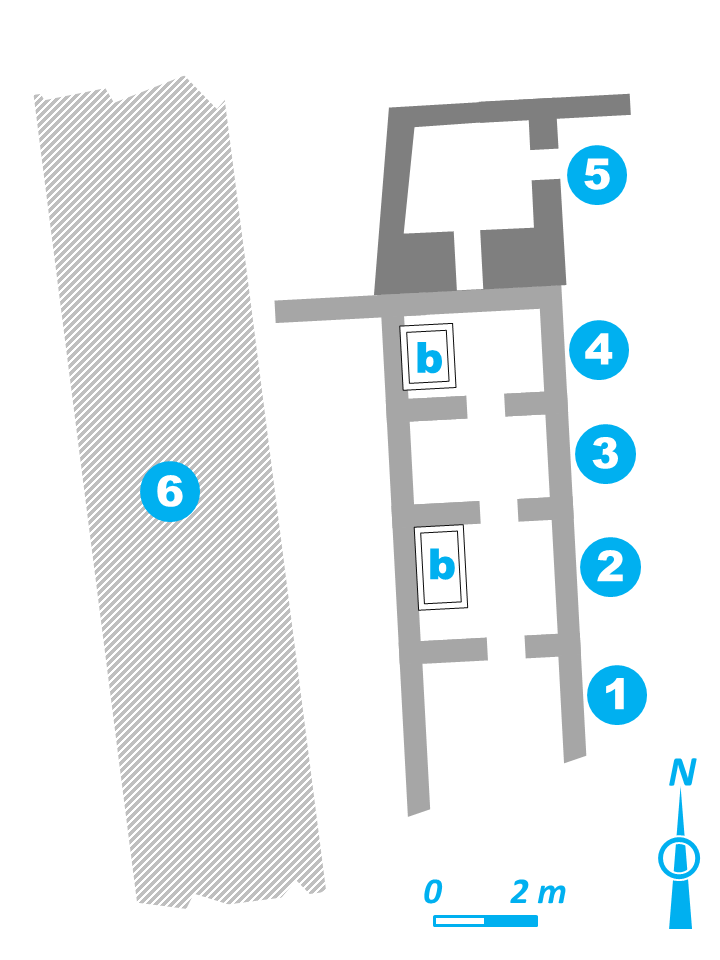
Diagrammatic plan of the Eastern Baths, 2nd state. (Note: Galinié, Husi & Motteau 2014, p. 119) (1) - apodyterium. (2) - frigidarium. (3) - tepidarium. (4) - caldarium. (5) - praefurnium. (6) - enclosure from the Late Empire. (b) - bathtub.

The first constructions of buildings on the site, around 60 or 70 AD, were accompanied by landfilling to the north to create a terrace, allowing for the reclamation of land from the Loire River’s bank. The first phase of the Eastern Baths, dating to around 60 or 70 AD, was characterized by two building structures positioned to the south and east of an open space identified as the palaestra. The eastern wing, entirely outside the excavation area, is only identified by its western wall, which separates it from the palaestra; its masonry consists of a small apparatus of regular limestone blocks (opus vittatum). The southern wing is known only by a north-south corridor, at least 10 meters long, which provides access to a room built on a hypocaust as well as an east-west gallery serving the eastern wing of the baths. The room with the hypocaust is identified as the tepidarium. If it had been a caldarium, the high temperature and humidity that prevailed there would have required frequent repairs, (Note: Bedon, Pinon & Chevallier 1988, p. 302) which are not observed. The southern wing of the baths likely extends well beyond the excavated area, to the south and possibly also to the west. Around 150 AD, an initial renovation affected the large corridor of the southern wing, which was terminated at its northern end by an apse. The palaestra, in turn, allowed direct access to the Loire River’s bank, which may have been developed accordingly; the Loire itself could have served as a bathing site. The baths, in this configuration, appear to have remained in use until the last quarter of the 3rd century. Within the excavated area, the baths occupied a surface of more than 800 m²; it is generally accepted that the total surface area of this thermal complex was approximately and perhaps exceeded 2,500 m².

==== Urban reorganization ====
Between 275 and 300 AD, the baths underwent partial dismantling—though difficult to discern due to multiple disturbances in the archaeological layers—without the site losing its function. This dismantling may have been a preliminary step for the construction of the Late Empire wall, whose western section was built in the supposed location of part of the southern wing of the baths. Rooms located along the future wall’s path were taken down, their materials salvaged, and the floors leveled.

In the first half of the 4th century, the Low Empire enclosure wall was built, enclosing an area of about 9 hectares, with the baths occupying the northwestern corner. The evolution of the baths during this period is not archaeologically documented, but it is generally accepted that they were no longer in operation. However, their definitive abandonment does not seem to have been immediately planned, as a postern gate was created on the western side of the northern section of the wall, facing the palaestra. This postern does not lead to any internal road, suggesting that its only purpose was to maintain access to the Loire River from the area formerly occupied by the palaestra.

==== Baths of the Late Empire ====
Around the year 350, and for only a few decades—at most about fifty years—the baths resumed operation, maintaining their function as a public space. Before this, they had undergone significant renovations, though the exact date of these modifications is unknown, their existence being confirmed solely through architectural evidence. Although this phase of the Eastern Baths' second state was the shortest in duration, it left the most archaeological remains, allowing for a partially reconstructed but highly precise layout of the buildings. The long corridor of the southern building, the only surviving structure from the first phase of this southern wing of the baths, was transformed into a small-scale thermal complex, subdivided to create a sequence of rooms. From south to north, the layout included an apodyterium (changing room), a frigidarium equipped with a small pool or bathtub, a tepidarium with a limestone tile floor, and a caldarium also fitted with a bathtub. These last two rooms, heated by an hypocaust system—some of whose supporting pilae have been preserved—featured walls equipped with tubuli (hollow clay pipes for heat circulation). The heating system (praefurnium) was located to the north of the caldarium, (Note: Galinié, Husi & Motteau 2014, p. 118) and its furnace may have supported a tank used to heat water. This room arrangement follows a linear layout, meaning that visitors would have had to retrace their steps in reverse to exit the baths. (Note: Bedon, Pinon & Chevallier 1988, p. 297) The rooms were relatively small, around 5 m² each, except for the apodyterium, whose exact size is unknown but exceeded 9 m². This limited size does not seem to challenge the baths' status as a public facility. Wastewater appears to have been discharged through the western wall of the wing into a depression located between the buildings and the city wall, before a ditch—of unknown purpose—was later dug in the area. (Note: Galinié, Husi & Motteau 2014, p. 119) Such an arrangement is surprising, as maintaining an open space at the base of the rampart for surveillance patrols would have been a more logical design. (Note: Galinié 1978, p. 645)

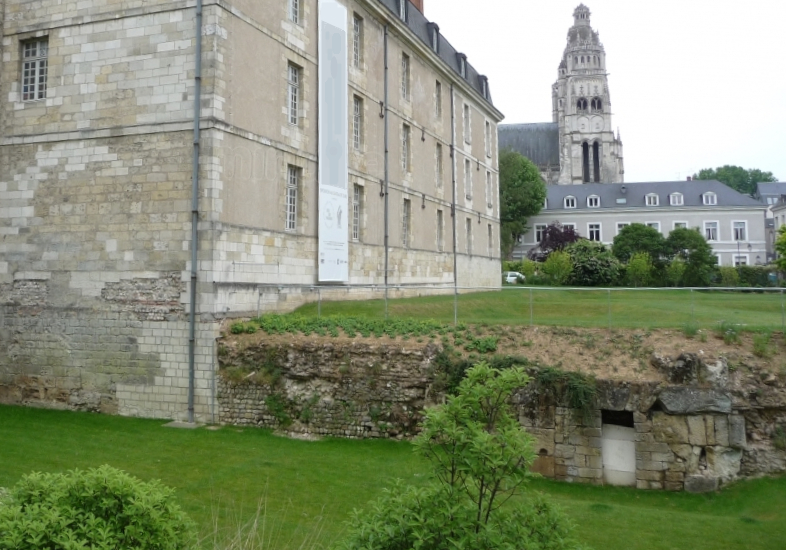
The postern gate to the thermal baths area, seen from the north.

The postern gate providing access to the area corresponding to the palaestra may have served as a service entrance for supplying the baths with fuel. An underground sewer running beneath its threshold paving has been identified.

The eastern wing remains outside the excavated area, but an examination of its only visible wall reveals modifications similar to those in the southern wing, such as partitioning, heated rooms with tubuli inserted into the walls, and a wastewater drainage system that used a masonry channel leading toward the postern. Even in this configuration, the Eastern Baths appear larger than their intramural counterparts in other Late Empire cities.

During the brief period when these baths were operational again, the praefurnium in the southern wing, built of stone and local clayey sand, (Note: Galinié, Husi & Motteau 2014, p. 121) suffered severe water damage, likely from leaking pipes or overflowing reservoirs. It had to be reconstructed but was ultimately abandoned as the damage persisted. (Note: Galinié, Husi & Motteau 2014, p. 120) These leaks may have originated from an aqueduct supplying the baths, though this hypothesis is tenuous and based on the presence of a transverse wall that might have supported a water conduit passing over the enclosure wall. (Note: The archaeologists responsible for the excavations suggest that these recurring water leakage issues might indicate a chronic malfunction affecting the entire city (Galinié 2007, p. 66).)

By the 4th century, the Eastern Baths were enclosed within the fortified perimeter of the castrum. This enclosure likely housed residences belonging to individuals of higher social status than those living outside the walls. It is therefore plausible that the Eastern Baths were frequented by a wealthier population at this time. (Note: Galinié, Husi & Motteau 2014, p. 132)

==== From baths to housing ====
Around 400–420 AD, thermal activity ceased simultaneously in both wings. The bathhouse floors deteriorated, and building materials were salvaged. The structures were repurposed as residential dwellings. Artifacts recovered from the site, along with evidence of dietary habits, suggest that the new occupants may have been military troops, either Roman or "barbarian." (Note: Galinié 2007, p. 221)

Proposed chronology for the Eastern Baths

Some dates in the history of Tours Chronology of the Eastern Baths

== Possible bathing establishments ==
The hypothesis regarding the existence of these two bath complexes is based on excavations conducted during the 1970s and 1980s. No further studies—whether new excavations or a reassessment of the data gathered at that time—have confirmed or refuted these theories.

=== Saint-Pierre-le-Puellier ===
This site corresponds to the cloister of a former medieval abbey, of which only a few remains of the abbey church survive.

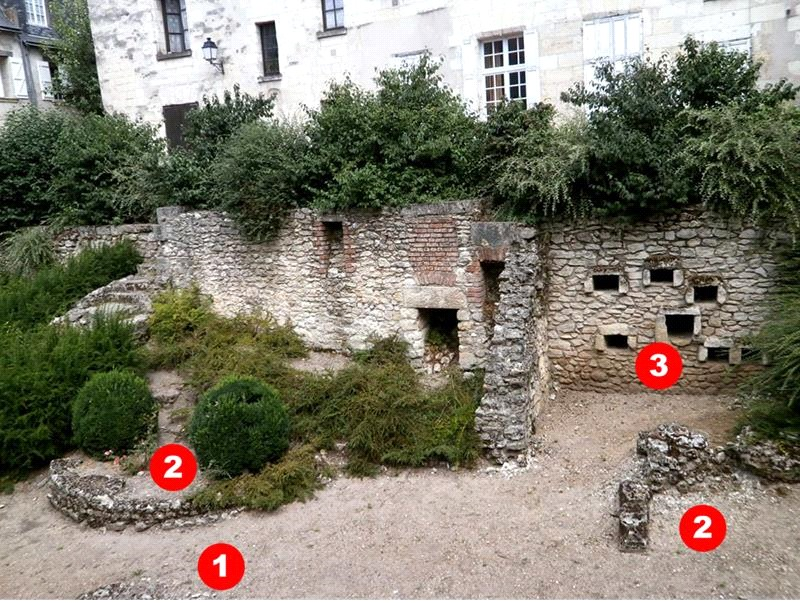
The archaeological garden of Saint-Pierre le Puellier. (1) - Remains from the High Empire. (2) and (3) - Late antique or medieval remains.

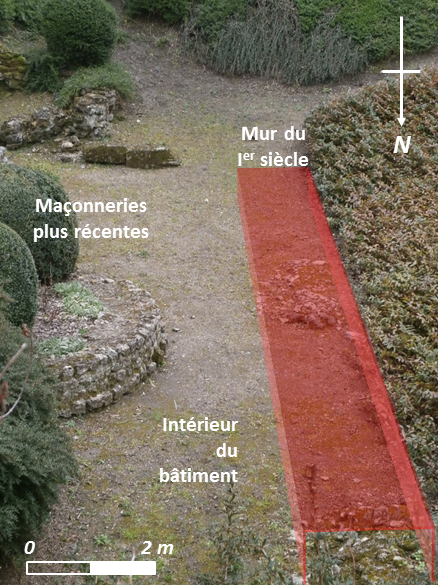
Remains of an ancient building on the site of Saint-Pierre-le-Puellier (the Loire is to the north).

Excavations and surveys were carried out between 1969 and 1974 during the first urban archaeology project in Tours. The site was occupied throughout the Roman Empire. After a period of abandonment, during which standing ruins remained, it was repurposed at the end of the first millennium, possibly as a dumping ground among the still-existing ruins. In antiquity, it was located near the southern bank of the Loire.

The earliest remains found at the site seem to date from the beginning of the Common Era, corresponding to the city's founding, and include traces of walls and ceramic sherds. A large north-south oriented building with a doorway opening onto the Loire’s shoreline has been identified. Its purpose is unclear, but its size suggests it was a public structure (photo: Le jardin archéologique de Saint-Pierre-le-Puellier, marker 1). Fragments of mosaics "covered in layered calcite" (Note: Blanchard-Lemée 1991, notice No. 645) were discovered at the site. These mosaics had been exposed to prolonged contact with hot water, alternating with periods of evaporation when exposed to air, which led to the precipitation and stratification of calcium carbonate. They likely covered the floor or walls of a heated pool. The north-south building was bordered on its western side by a stream or an open-air sewer that emptied into the Loire.

It is possible that this 1st-century building was part of a public bath complex, but this hypothesis remains unconfirmed. It is based on the interpretation of archaeological remains and the site’s topography: the proximity of the Loire would have facilitated water supply and/or drainage, while the location at the periphery of the urban area would have minimized pollution from the bath heating fumes. However, the highly fragmented nature of the unearthed remains does not allow for a reconstruction of the thermal establishment.

In the 3rd century, the site underwent reorganization. The buildings, which included several small basins and a wastewater drainage system, seem to have taken on an artisanal function. It may have housed tanneries that partially repurposed the facilities of the former baths. (Note: In antiquity and the Middle Ages, tanneries were often established outside cities due to pollution concerns (mainly odor). The soaking baths required for leather processing demanded a significant and consistent water supply (Coulon 2006, p. 147).)

=== Rue Néricault-Destouches ===
This site corresponds to the location of the former labor exchange (Bourse du Travail) of Tours, situated between Rue Néricault-Destouches and Rue de Clocheville: 47°23′33″N 0°41′11″E.

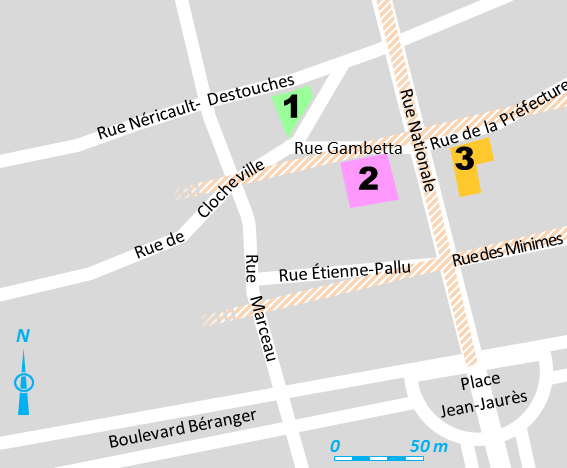
Location of the supposed thermal baths in rue Néricault-Destouches. Orange hatching: supposed ancient road network. (1) - supposed thermal baths. (2) - urbanized area. (3) - proven thermal baths in the South.

In this area of Tours, the oldest archaeological layers were significantly disturbed in the 14th century by the digging of a ditch at the base of the medieval city walls, which were built at that time. (Note: Rue de Clocheville and part of Rue Néricault-Destouches follow the path of the former Rue des Fossés-Saint-Georges, which was built along the ditches that accompanied the 14th-century city wall, positioned on their northern flank.) Subsequent repairs to the ditch further altered these layers. On the site itself, a construction project in 1965 led to the deliberate destruction of uncovered archaeological remains, due to concerns over potential delays to the work.

In 1982, a preventive excavation on the edge of Rue Néricault-Destouches (Saint-Michel-de-la-Guerche site) revealed ancient structures, though they had been heavily damaged by later developments. These remains were identified as part of a private bathhouse: a room with a hypocaust, a basin coated in tuileau mortar, and several other rooms. The foundations and walls of these structures were built using reused materials, "very likely originating from monumental buildings."

The hypothesis suggests the presence of small public baths at this location or within this sector, built in the 1st century and later sold when the city's geographical contraction began. Due to the extremely fragmentary nature of these reused remains, no reconstruction proposal can be made for the building to which they originally belonged. In the 2nd century, the owner of a domus is believed to have reused elements from these public baths for the construction of a private bathing facility.

At the time of its discovery, archaeologists thought that this small thermal establishment, like the one at Saint-Pierre-le-Puellier—the only other presumed public bathing facility known in the 1980s—was located on the outskirts of the ancient city. However, it now appears that the urbanized area in the 1st and 2nd centuries was more extensive, meaning that if the baths on Rue Néricault-Destouches did exist, they would have been within the city limits.

== Protection of sites ==
Among the known remains, only those of the Eastern Baths, which are preserved in situ, and those of the presumed baths at Saint-Pierre-le-Puellier, which are exposed to the open air in an archaeological pit, remain easily accessible for further studies. None of the remains mentioned above benefit from official protection as historical monuments. However, in the safeguarded sector of Tours classified as “Level A,” as defined by the prefectural decree of August 6, 2003—which includes the remains of the supposed bathhouses—all construction work affecting buildings (demolition, construction, modifications), except for roof repairs and façade restoration of modern buildings, regardless of their scale, must be subject to prior approval from the regional prefect for potential “archaeological instructions and requirements.”

== See also ==
- Gallia Lugdunensis

== Bibliography ==
=== Specific publications on the archaeology and history of Tours ===
- Audin, Pierre (2002). Tours à l'époque gallo-romaine [Towers in the Gallo-Roman era] (in French). Saint-Cyr-sur-Loire: Alan Sutton. ISBN 2-84253-748-3.
- Chevalier, Bernard (1985). Histoire de Tours [History of Tours] (in French). Toulouse: Privat. ISBN 2-7089-8224-9.
- Croubois, Claude (1986). L'indre-et-Loire – La Touraine, des origines à nos jours [Indre-et-Loire – Touraine, from its origins to the present day]. L’histoire par les documents (in French). Saint-Jean-d’Angely: Bordessoules. ISBN 2-903504-09-1.
- Galinié, Henri (1976). "Fouilles archéologiques sur le site de Saint-Pierre-le Puellier (1969-1974) - Rapport préliminaire" [Archaeological excavations at the site of Saint-Pierre-le Puellier (1969-1974) - Preliminary report]. Bulletin de la Société archéologique de Touraine (in French). XXXVIII: 155–172.
- Galinié, Henri (1978). "Fouilles archéologiques sur le site du Château royal de Tours, 1974-1978. Rapport préliminaire, 1re partie" [Archaeological excavations on the site of the Château Royal de Tours, 1974-1978. Preliminary report, 1st. part]. Bulletin de la Société archéologique de Touraine (in French). XXXVIII: 636–662.
- Galinié, Henri (2007). Tours antique et médiéval. Lieux de vie, temps de la ville. 40 ans d'archéologie urbaine, Supplément à la RACF n° 30, numéro spécial de la collection Recherches sur Tours [Ancient and medieval towers. Living spaces, city times. 40 years of urban archaeology, Supplement to RACF No. 30, special issue of the Recherches sur Tours collection] (in French). Tours: FERACF. ISBN 978-2-913272-15-6.
- Galinié, Henri; Husi, Philippe; Motteau, James (2014). Des Thermes de l'Est de Caesarodunum au Château de Tours : le site 3 : 50e supplément à la Revue archéologique du centre de la France (RACF) [From the Eastern Baths of Caesarodunum to the Château de Tours: site 3: 50th supplement to the Revue archéologique du centre de la France (RACF)]. Recherches sur Tours 9 (in French). Tours: FERACF. ISBN 978-2-913272-36-1.
- Jouquand, Anne-Marie; Lorans, Élisabeth; Seigne, Jacques (2024). Tours. Carte archéologique de la Gaule (in French). Paris: Académie des Inscriptions et Belles-Lettres and Maison des Sciences de l'Homme. ISBN 978-2-8775-4703-1.
- Provost, Michel (1988). Carte archéologique de la Gaule : l'Indre-et Loire-37 [Archaeological map of Gaul: Indre-et-Loire-37] (in French). Paris: Académie des Inscriptions et Belles-Lettres. ISBN 2-87754-002-2.

=== General publications on architecture and town planning in the Roman Empire ===
- Barideau, Stéphanie. L'approvisionnement en eau des capitales de cités en région Centre (Tours, Bourges, Chartres, Orléans) : Mémoire de maîtrise en Histoire de l'Art [The water supply of the regional capitals of the Center region (Tours, Bourges, Chartres, Orléans): Master's thesis in Art History] (in French). Tours: Université François-Rabelais.
- Boudeau, Boudeau (2009). La réorganisation spatiale de cinquante-cinq villes de Gaule remparées au Bas-Empire : Thèse de doctorat en histoire, mention archéologie [The spatial reorganization of fifty-five Gallic cities fortified in the Late Empire: Doctoral thesis in history, with a mention in archaeology] (PDF) (in French). Tours: Université François-Rabelais.
- Bedon, Robert; Pinon, Pierre; Chevallier, Raymond (1988). Architecture et urbanisme en Gaule romaine : L'architecture et la ville [Architecture and urban planning in Roman Gaul: Architecture and the city]. Les Hespérides (in French). Vol. 1. Paris: Errance. ISBN 2-903442-79-7.
- Blanchard-Lemée, Michèle (1991). Recueil général des mosaïques de la Gaule : II : Province de Lyonnaise, 4. Partie occidentale [General collection of the mosaics of Gaul: II: Province of Lyonnaise, 4. Western part] (in French). Paris: Éditions du CNRS. ISBN 2-222-04437-5.
- Coulon, Gérard (2006). Les Gallo-Romains [The Gallo-Romans]. Civilisations et cultures (in French). Paris: Errance. ISBN 2-87772-331-3.
- Duby, Georges (1980). Histoire de la France urbaine, vol. 1 : La ville antique, des origines au 9e siècle [History of Urban France, vol. 1: The Ancient City, from its Origins to the 9th Century]. L’univers historique (in French). Paris: le Seuil. ISBN 2-02-005590-2.
