= Denklingen =

- Municipality
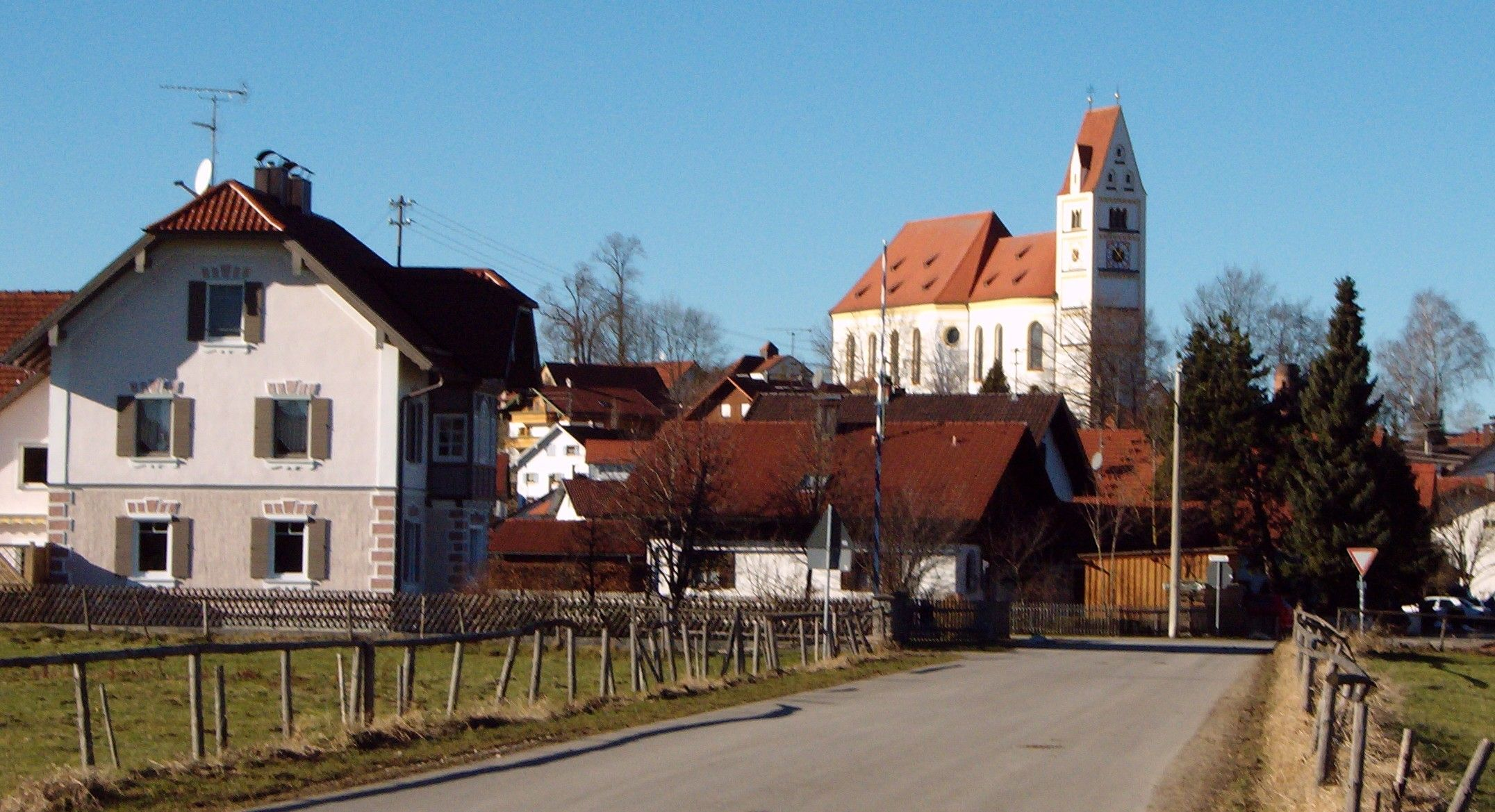
- Church of Saint Michael in Denklingen

- Coat of arms

- Location of Denklingen within Landsberg am Lech district
- Interactive map of Denklingen
- Location within Germany Location within Bavaria
- Coordinates: 47°55′N 10°51′E
- Country: Germany
- State: Bavaria
- Admin. region: Oberbayern
- District: Landsberg am Lech
- Subdivisions: 3 Ortsteile

Government
  - Mayor (2023–29): Andreas Braunegger

Area
  - Total: 56.77 km^{2} (21.92 sq mi)
- Elevation: 708 m (2,323 ft)

Population (2025-12-31)
  - Total: 2,898
  - Density: 51.05/km^{2} (132.2/sq mi)
- Time zone: UTC+01:00 (CET)
  - Summer (DST): UTC+02:00 (CEST)
- Postal codes: 86920
- Dialling codes: 08243 (Denklingen) 08869 (Epfach)
- Vehicle registration: LL
- Website: www.denklingen.de

Denklingen (German pronunciation: [ˈdɛŋklɪŋən]) is a municipality in the district of Landsberg (also called Landsberg am Lech) in Bavaria in Germany. The former municipality of Epfach, which has a history back to the Roman period, is now part of Denklingen.

== Geography ==
Denklingen is the most southwesterly municipality in the district of Landsberg. It is located on flats to the west of the Lech River. It is at the edge of Denklinger Rotwalds (red forest of Denklingen) and Sachsenrieder forest.
