= Epfach =

- Ortsteil of Denklingen
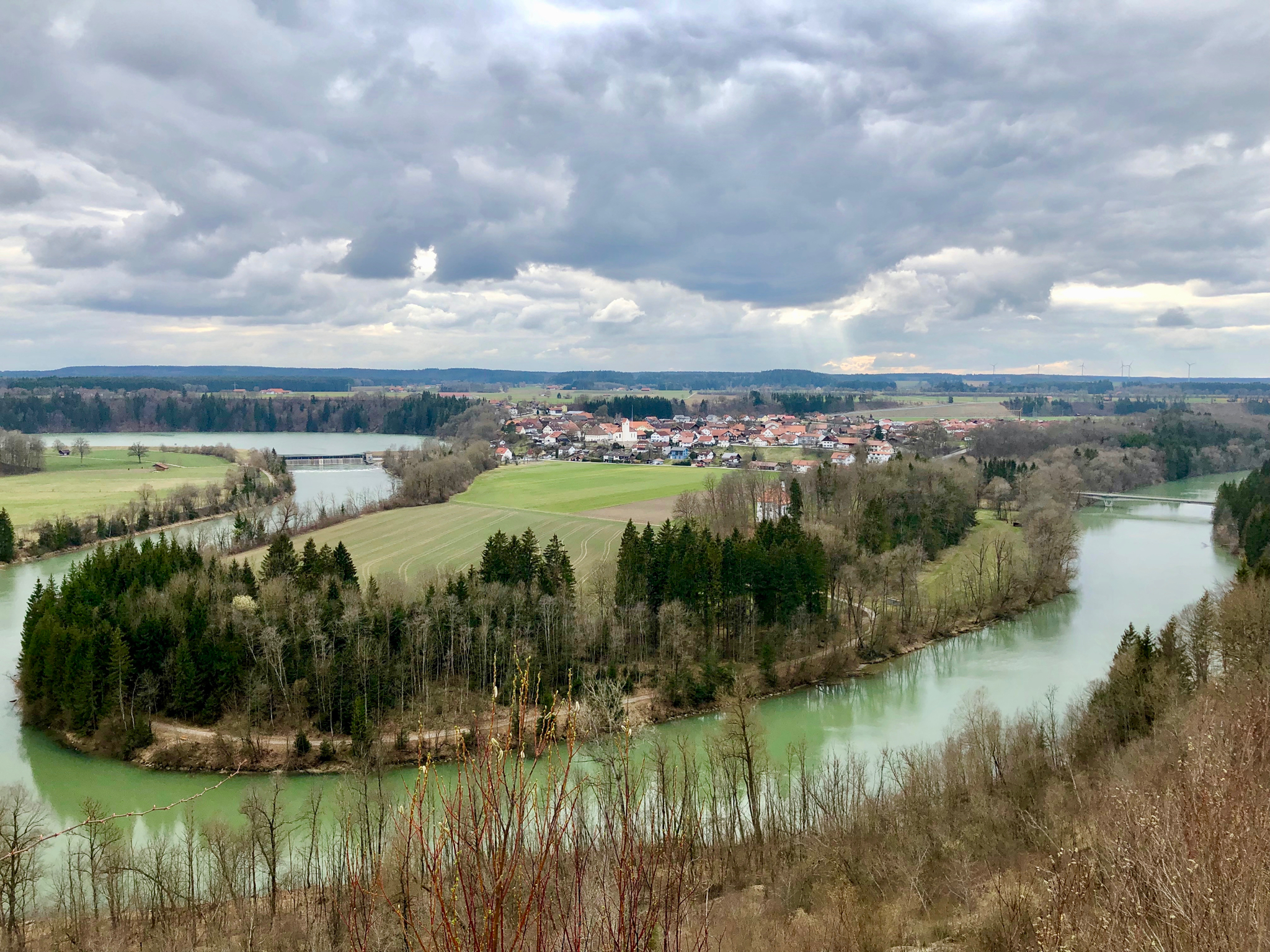
- Epfach and the Lech

- Coat of arms
- Interactive map of Epfach
- Location within Germany Location within Bavaria
- Coordinates: 47°54′43″N 10°54′36″E
- Country: Germany
- State: Bavaria
- Admin. region: Oberbayern
- District: Landsberg
- Municipality: Denklingen
- Elevation: 650 m (2,130 ft)
- Time zone: UTC+01:00 (CET)
  - Summer (DST): UTC+02:00 (CEST)
- Postal codes: 86920
- Dialling codes: 08869
- Vehicle registration: LL

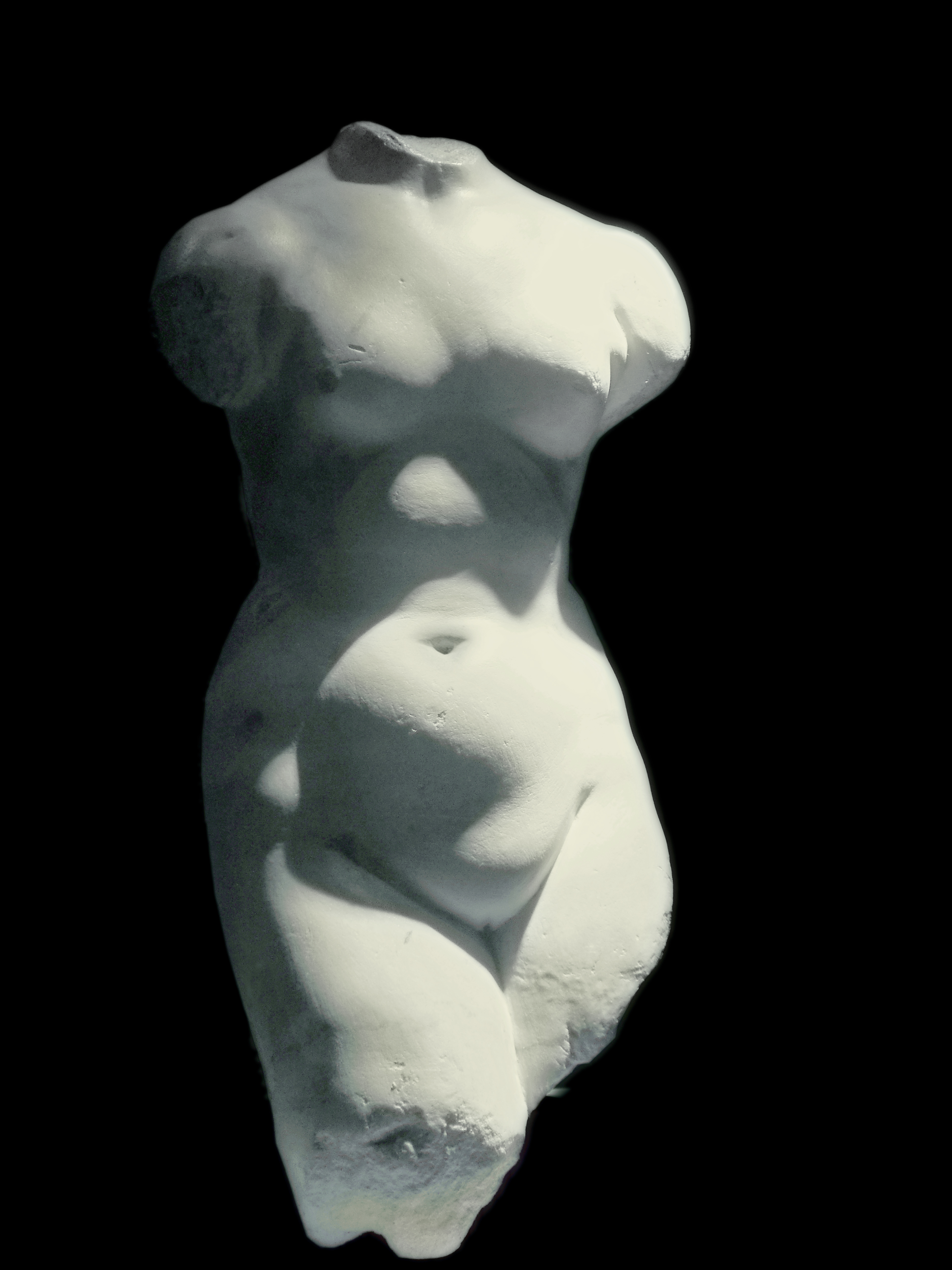
Venus from Epfach.

Epfach is a village and former municipality (Gemeinde) located on the left bank of Lech, in the municipality of Denklingen in the Upper Bavarian District of Landsberg, Bavaria, Germany.

== History ==
Around 14 BCE there was, near the present village, on the hill later called Lorenzberg, directly on the Lech, a Roman road station (castra) with about 80 soldiers and riders. These had the task of securing the intersection of the Via Claudia with the old salt road, which came from Salzburg, and here crossed the Lech, then on to Kempten. At the time, it was the most important road junction in southern Bavaria.

From 50 CE, the castra became unnecessary. The expansion of the Roman Empire made surrounding area safe enough. Now a settlement was built on the site, in which craftsmen and traders settled. It was named Abodiacum.

In 233, the Alemanni destroyed the settlement and left a field of rubble. But between 260 and 270, the site of Lorenzberg was re-populated, but this time with an enclosure wall built out of fear of Germanic raids.

Around 355, the settlement was again destroyed by the Alemanni, but soon colonized and rebuilt by the Romans. Until 388 Roman troops were stationed on the Lorenzberg.

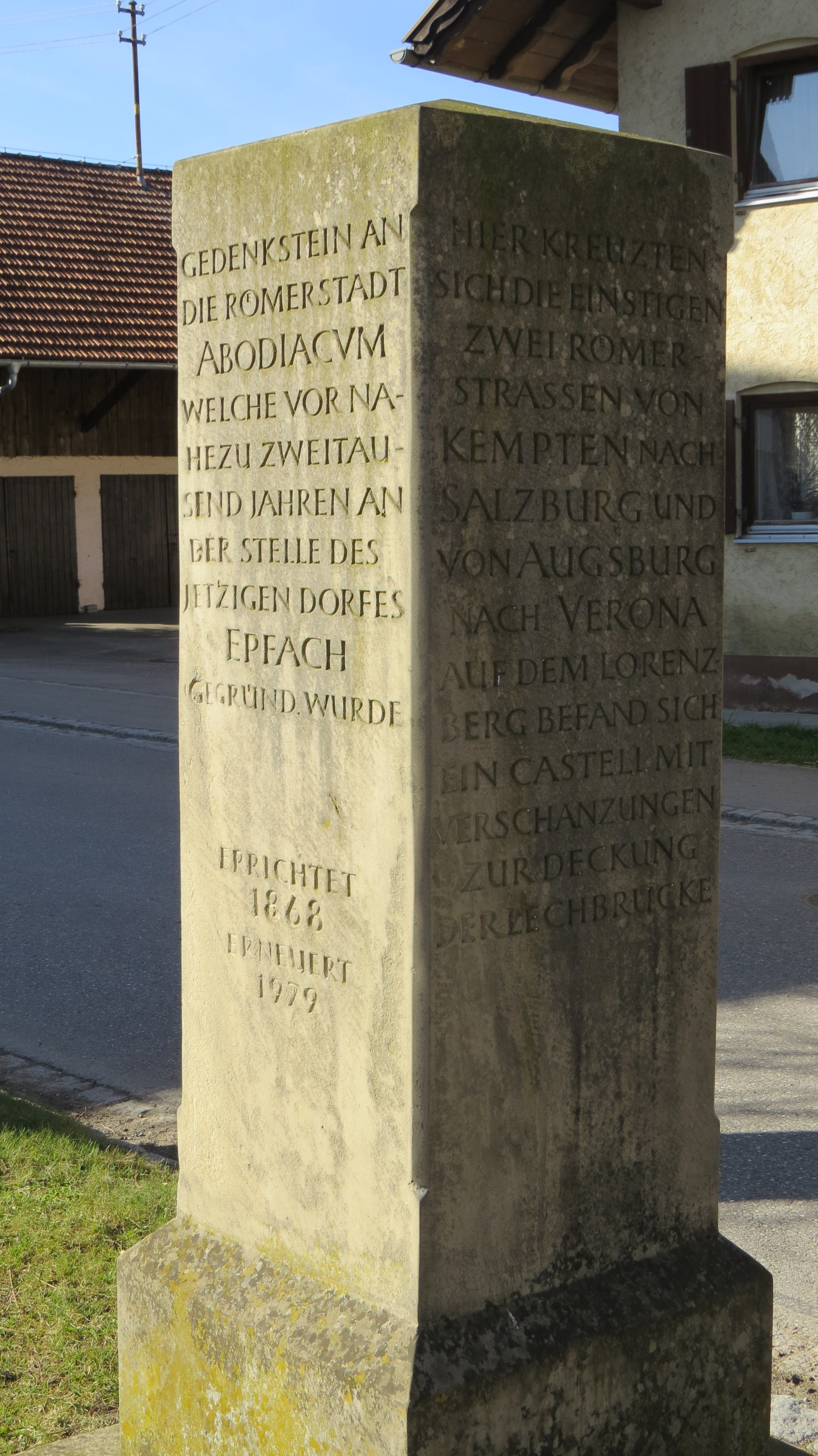
Memorial to the town's Roman foundations.

Around 370 or 380 a rectangular hall building with a three-part choir end was built on the highest point of the Lorenzberg, which is interpreted as a Christian "community building". After 955, a larger church, dedicated to St. Lawrence, was built, partly over the oldest church from the 4th century. The former coat of arms shows a Roman oil lamp together with the golden Christogram.

Today, the town lies on the long-distance cycling route, which runs along the Via Claudia Augusta. On 1 July 1972, the previously independent municipality, which belonged to the erstwhile Schongau district, was incorporated into the municipality of Denklingen.

== Visitor attractions ==
- The small museum Abodiacum in the former fire department with finds from the Roman period, two models and wall panels with descriptions of the historical period
- St. Lawrence (St Lorenz) church on the Lorenzberg
- A Roman fountain house nymphaeum near the school
- A bronze statue of St. Lawrence with plaque on the Lech bridge
- Catholic parish church of St. Bartholomew (St. Bartholomäus)

== Literature ==
- Klaus Fischer: 2000 Jahre Epfach. Beiträge zur Ortsgeschichte. Epfach 1986.
- Günter Ulbert: Der Lorenzberg bei Epfach. Die frührömische Militärstation. Münchner Beiträge zur Vor- und Frühgeschichte. Vol. 9, Beck, Munich 1965.
- Joachim Werner (ed.): Studien zu Abodiacum – Epfach. Münchner Beiträge zur Vor- und Frühgeschichte. Vol 7, Beck, Munich 1964.
- Joachim Werner: Der Lorenzberg bei Epfach. Die spätrömischen u. frühmittelalterlichen Anlagen. Münchner Beiträge zur Vor- und Frühgeschichte. Vol 8m Beck, Munich 1969.
- Anton Huber, Martha Ikier, Bruno Ikier: Epfach in alten Photographien. EOS-Druckerei, St. Ottilien 1998.

== See also ==
- Abodiacum, old Roman castra adjacent to the village
