= Anvallus =

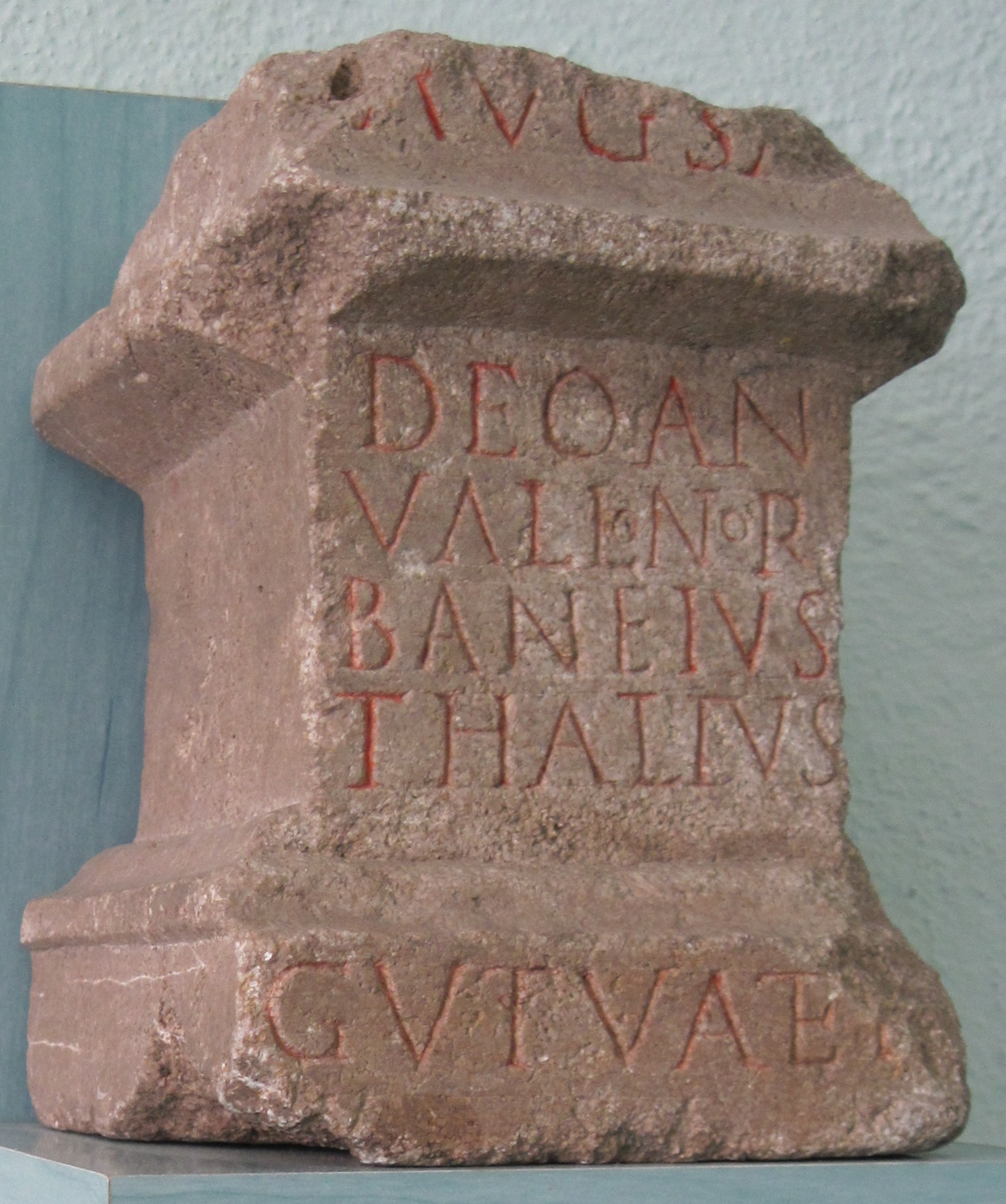
One of the two Latin altars dedicated to Anvallus. The inscription may be interpreted as "Consecrated to the august, to the god Anvallus, Norbaneius Thallus the gutuater [freely and deservedly fulfilled his vow]".

Anvallus was a Gaulish god, known from several public inscriptions at Augustodunum (Autun). Two Latin inscriptions on altars were dedicated by gutuatres in requital of vows; both such dedications began with the formula Aug(usto) sacr(um). The title gutuater is typically understood to mean 'priest'; the gutuatres have at times been taken to be Romanized continuations of the druids. These altars were both discovered in 1900 on the site of Autun's railway station, along with a Greek-style helmet of thin bronze that would have been left there as a votive offering.

The third text mentioning a name similar to Anvallus was a Gaulish text found on a limestone cartouche:

LICNOS · CON
TEXTOS · IEVRV
ANVALONNACV ·
CANECOSEDLON ·

According to P.-Y. Lambert and J.-P. Savignac, this stone commemorated the dedication of a kind of seat or throne by a person named Licnos Contextos. The seat was dedicated to a sanctuary of Anvalos, in the interpretation of P.-Y. Lambert; Delmarre gives the translation "Licnos Contextus dedicated to Anvalonnacos the (golden?) seat".

The god's name has been analyzed as a composition an-ualos, of which the second root has been understood to mean 'sovereign' or 'prince', and the first 'without' or 'not'. The name might therefore be understood as 'without a sovereign', i.e. inferior to none.
