= Gallia Lugdunensis =

Province of the Roman Empire (area now part of France)

Coordinates: 45.7597°N 4.8194°E

Province of Gallia Lugdunensis Provincia Gallia Lvgdvnensis
- Province of the Roman Empire
- 27–25 BC / 16–13 BC – 486
- Province of Gallia Lugdunensis highlighted.
- Capital: Lugdunum
- Historical era: Antiquity
  - Established after the Gallic Wars: 27–25 BC / 16–13 BC
  - Gallic Empire: 260–274
  - Kingdom of the Franks: 486
Succeeded by
Kingdom of the Franks
- Today part of: France

Gallia Lugdunensis (French: Gaule Lyonnaise) was a province of the Roman Empire in what is now the modern country of France, part of the Celtic territory of Gaul formerly known as Celtica. It is named after its capital Lugdunum (today's Lyon), possibly Roman Europe's major city west of Italy, and a major imperial mint. Outside Lugdunum was the Sanctuary of the Three Gauls, where representatives met to celebrate the cult of Rome and Augustus.

== History ==
In De Bello Gallico describing his conquest of Gaul (58–50 BC), Julius Caesar distinguished between provincia nostra in the south of Gaul, which already was a Roman province in his time, and the three other parts of Gaul: the territories of the Aquitani, of the Belgae, and of the Galli also known as the Celtae. The territory of the Galli extended from the rivers Seine and Marne in the north-east, which formed the boundary with Gallia Belgica, to the river Garonne in the south-west, which formed the border with Gallia Aquitania. Under Augustus, Gallia Lugdunensis was created by reducing in size the territory of the Gauls (Galli): the portion between the river Loire and the Garonne was given to Gallia Aquitania, and central-eastern portions were given to the new province of Germania Superior. The map shows the extent after these reductions. The date of the creation of Gallia Lugdunensis is under discussion, whether between 27 and 25 BC or between 16 and 13 BC, during Augustus' visits to Gaul.

It was an imperial province, deemed important enough to be governed by an imperial legate. Under the Tetrarchy (AD 296), it was first divided into two, Lugdunensis Prima, with its capital at Lyon, and Lugdunensis Secunda, with its capital at Rouen. This division is recorded in the Verona List. Both new provinces belonged to the diocese of Gaul, alongside the Helvetic, Belgian and German provinces.

Constantine I (r. 306–337 AD) divided the provinces again. Lugdunensis Senonia, with its capital at Sens, was split off from Prima, while Lugdunensis Tertia, with its capital at Tours, was separated from Secunda. According to the Notitia Dignitatum, Prima was governed by a consularis, while the other three were governed by a praeses. All the provinces were gradually overrun by invading Franks and Burgundians during the 5th century. What was left of the provinces effectively ceased to exist in AD 486/487 when the Roman general Syagrius, who controlled Secunda and Senonia, was defeated by the Franks.

The cities and castra of the four provinces are listed in the late 4th-century Notitia Galliarum by their ethnic titles. The castrum of Mâcon is a later addition to the Notitia. They are listed here with their conventional short names (where different from the ethnic name) and their modern names:

- Lugdunensis Prima
  1. Metropolis civitas Lugdunensium
    (Lyon)
  2. Civitas Aeduorum
    (Augustodunum, Autun)
  3. Civitas Lingonum
    (Andematunnum, Langres)
  4. Castrum Cabillonense
    (Chalon-sur-Saone)
  5. Castrum Matisconense
    (Mâcon)
- Lugdunensis Secunda
  1. Metropolis civitas Rotomagensium
    (Rouen)
  2. Civitas Baiocassium
    (Augustodorum, Bayeux)
  3. Civitas Abrincatum
    (Ingena, Avranches)
  4. Civitas Ebroicorum
    (Mediolanum, Évreux)
  5. Civitas Saiorum
    (Sées)
  6. Civitas Lexoviorum
    (Noviomagus, Lisieux)
  7. Civitas Constantia
    (Coutances)
- Lugdunensis Tertia
  1. Metropolis civitas Turinorum
    (Caesarodunum, Tours)
  2. Civitas Cenomannorum
    (Suindunum, Le Mans)
  3. Civitas Redonum
    (Condate, Rennes)
  4. Civitas Andecavorum
    (Iuliomagus, Angers)
  5. Civitas Namnetum
    (Condivincum, Nantes)
  6. Civitas Coriosolitum
    (Fanum Martis, Corseul)
  7. Civitas Venetum
    (Darioritum, Vannes)
  8. Civitas Osismorum
    (Vorgium, Carhaix)
  9. Civitas Diablintum
    (Noviodunum, Jublains)
- Lugdunensis Senonia
  1. Metropolis civitas Senonum
    (Agedincum, Sens)
  2. Civitas Carnotum
    (Autricum, Chartres)
  3. Civitas Autisiodorum
    (Auxerre)
  4. Civitas Tricassium
    (Augustobona, Troyes)
  5. Civitas Aurelianorum
    (Cenabum, Orléans)
  6. Civitas Parisiorum
    (Lutetia, Paris)
  7. Civitas Melduorum
    (Iatinum, Meaux)

== Governors ==
The Roman Empire in the time of Hadrian (ruled 117–138 AD), showing, in central Gaul, the imperial province of Gallia Lugdunensis (north/central France). Note that the coast lines shown on the map are those of today, known to be different from those in Roman times in parts of Gallia Lugdunensis.

- c. 21: Acilius Aviola
- 66-69 Junius Blaesus
- 78–80: Titus Tettienus Serenus
- 80–83: Gaius Cornelius Gallicanus
- 83–87: Lucius Minicius Rufus
- Between 123 and 130: Tiberius Claudius Quartinus
- Between 126 and 137: Titus Vitrasius Pollio
- c. 146–149: Titus Flavius Longinus Quintus Marcius Turbo
- Between 138 and 161: [...] Pacatus
- Between 138 and 161: [...]latin Pi[...]atus
- 161–162: Gaius Popilius Carus Pedo
- Between 161 and 168: Lucius Aemilius Frontinus
- Between 160 and 169 or 177 and 180: [...] Egr[ilius Plarianus Larcius Lep]idus [Flavius ...]
- 187–188 or 185–189: Septimius Severus
- c. 195–198: Titius Flavius Secundus Philippianus
- c. 218: Tiberius Claudius Paulinus
- 220–222: Marcus Aedinius Julianus (procurator agens vice praesidis)
- After 223: Badius Comnianus (procurator agens vice praesidis)
- Between 240 and 245: Appius Alexander (praeses provinciae)

== See also ==
- Lyonesse
- Forum of Vieux-la-Romaine
- Gallo-Roman Baths of Tours
