= Abodiacum =

Ancient town of Vindelicia in modern Bavaria

Coordinates: 47°54′43″N 10°54′36″E

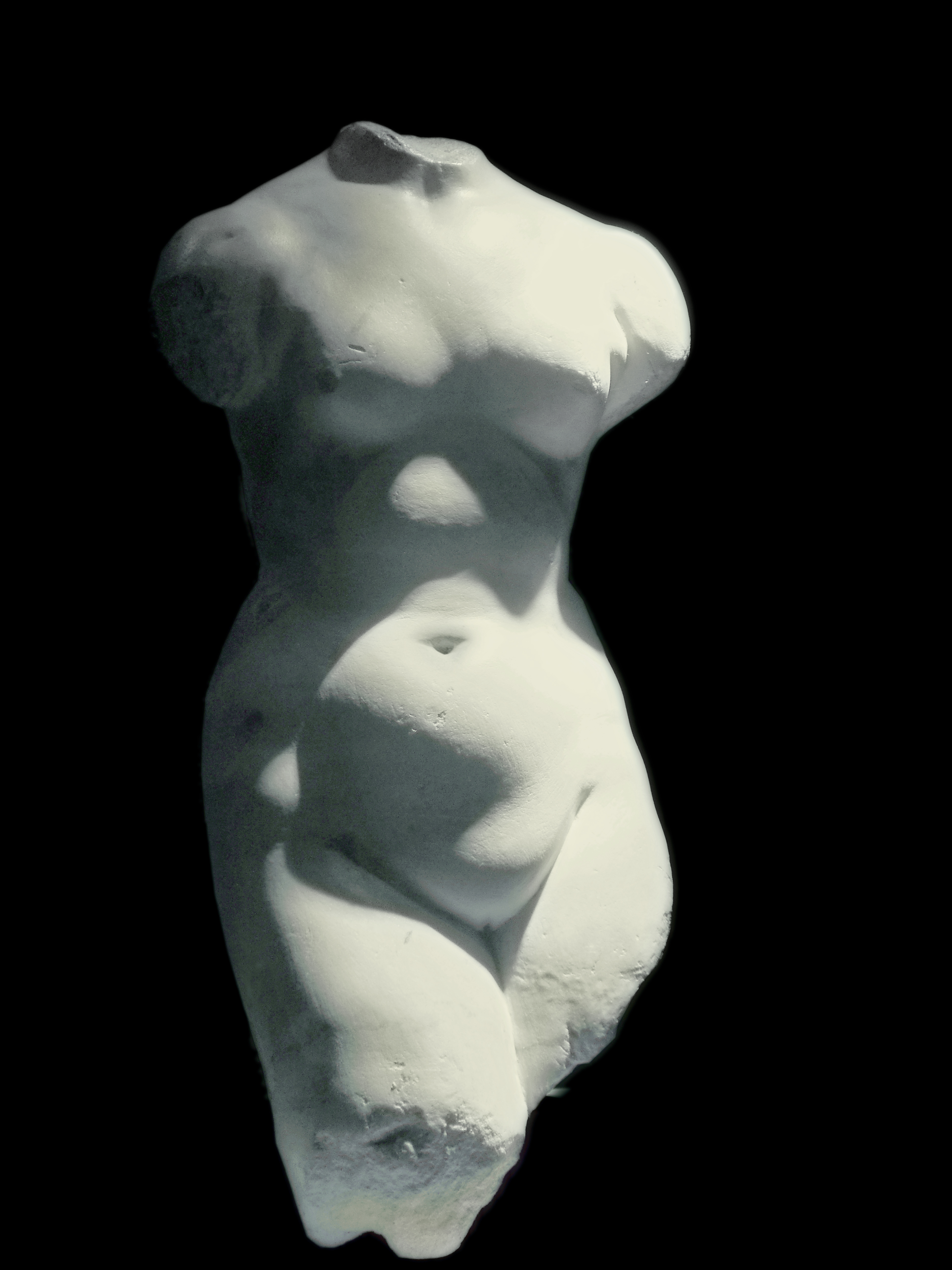
Statue of Venus recovered from Epfach.

Abodiacum or Auodiacum (Ancient Greek: Ἀβουδίακον) or Abuzacum was a town of Vindelicia, probably coinciding with the modern Epfach on the river Lech, where remains of Roman buildings are still extant. The stations, however, in the Itineraries and the Peutingerian Table are not easily identified with the site of Epfach; and Abodiacum is placed by some topographers at the hamlet of Peisenberg, on the slope of a hill with the same name, or in the neighbourhood of Rosenheim in Bavaria.
