= Bremerhaven Radar Tower =

Coordinates: 53°32′19″N 8°34′48″E

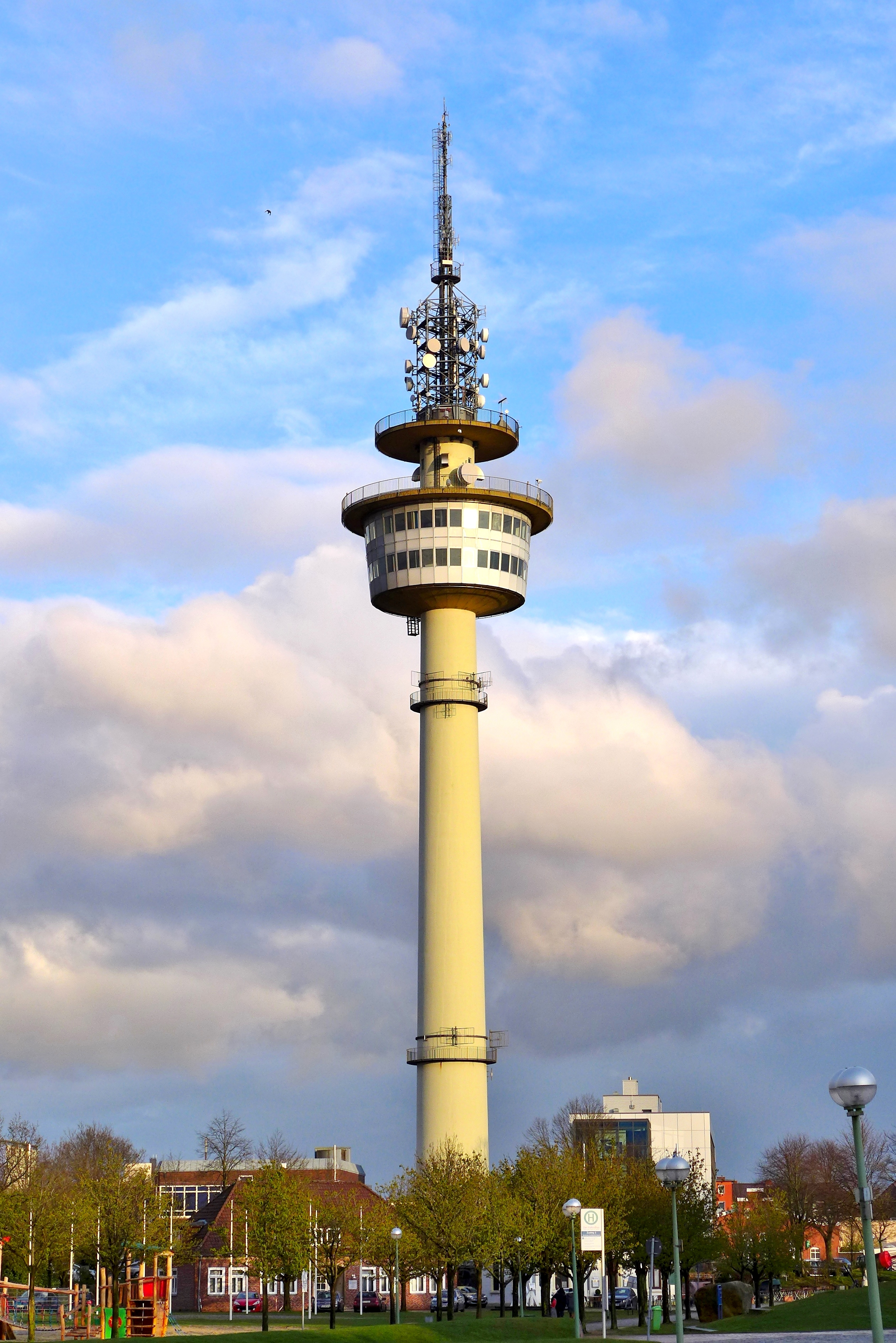
The radar tower in Bremerhaven

The Bremerhaven Radar Tower is a 106-metre reinforced concrete tower located in Bremerhaven, Germany. The radar tower, which was constructed between 1962 and 1965, accommodates numerous transmitting plants for maritime radio purposes, in addition to its radar equipment. A viewing platform is situated at the 60 metre level, and is accessible to the public.

Unlike other transmitting towers, the Bremerhaven facility belongs to the Bremerhaven Water and Shipping department and not Deutsche Telekom AG or a broadcasting corporation.

== See also ==
- List of towers
