= Bremerhaven University of Applied Sciences =

State university founded in 1975 in Bremerhaven, Germany

University of Applied Sciences Bremerhaven
- Hochschule Bremerhaven
- Motto: Alle an Bord
- Type: Public
- Established: September 1, 1975
- Rector: Alexis Papathanassis
- Academic staff: 150
- Students: 3,200
- Location: Bremerhaven, Germany; 53°32′23″N 8°34′58″E
- Campus: Urban
- Website: www.hs-bremerhaven.de

Bremerhaven University of Applied Sciences (Hochschule Bremerhaven) is a state university founded in 1975 in Bremerhaven. Around 3,200 students from 66 nations are currently enrolled in the 25 technical, natural, social, and economic science Bachelor's and Master's programs at the "University by the Sea".

The university has two faculties: one focused on energy and marine engineering; the other on life sciences, and further areas like logistics, ICT, automation, and services. The programs range from biotechnology, social work, maritime technologies, and ship operation engineering to cruise management, process engineering, energy technology, and medical technology, as well as digital media production and business informatics. Around 150 staff members in teaching and administration support the students.

== History ==
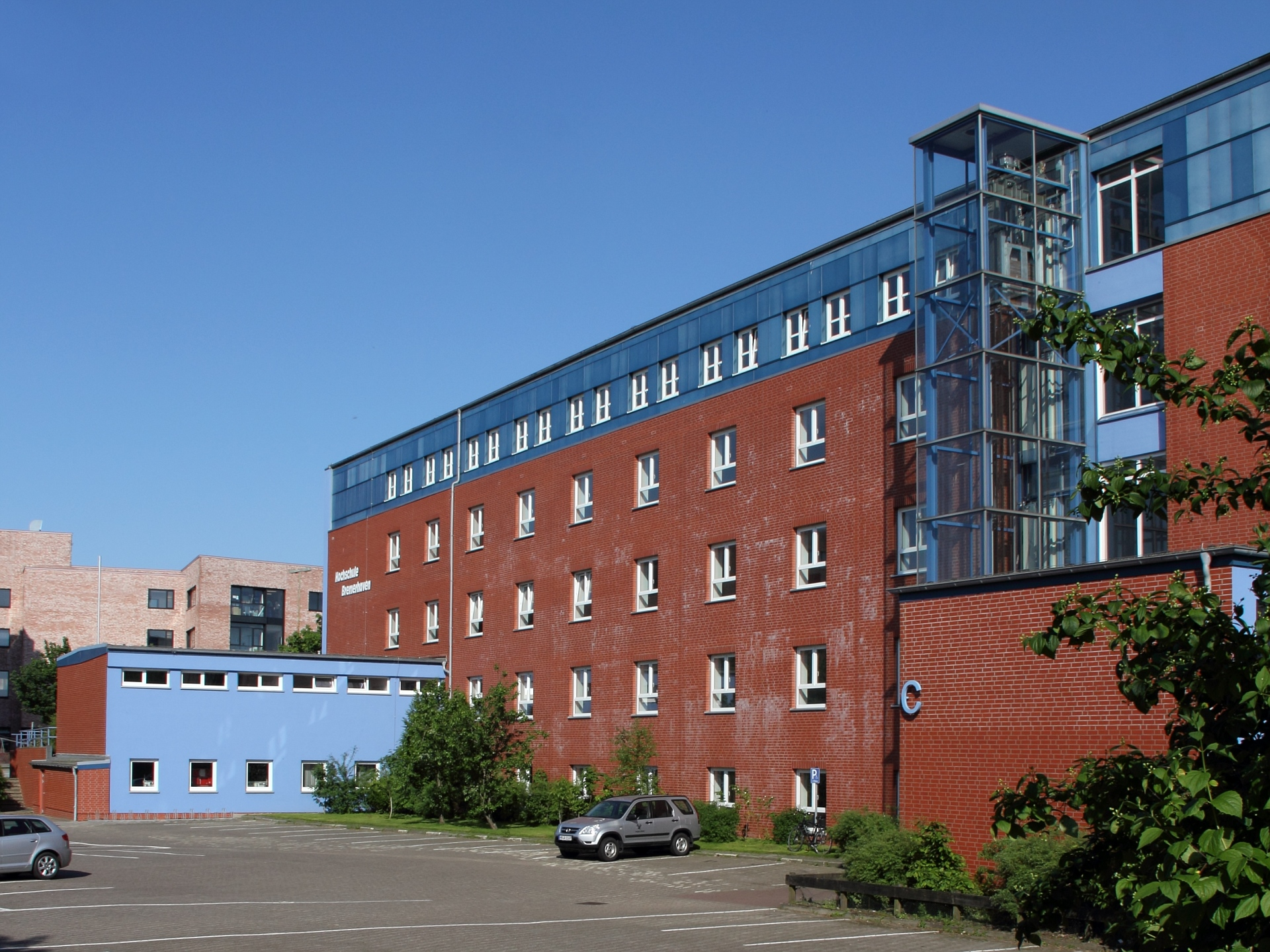
Building C, dating from 1960, is located west of Columbusstraße.

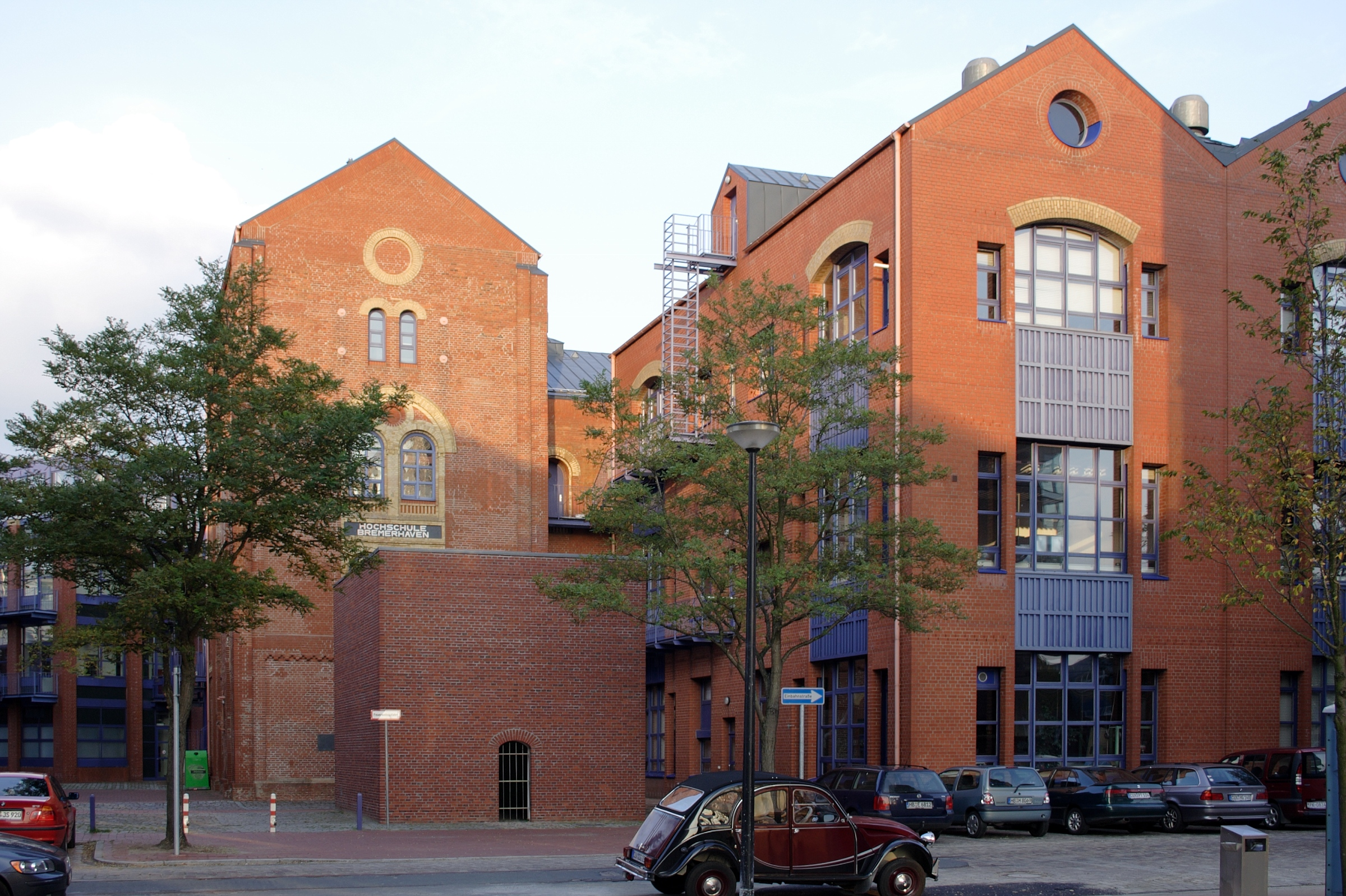
Building K (1985) faces Karlsburg Street. In front of it stands the cube-shaped emigration monument The Last Step.

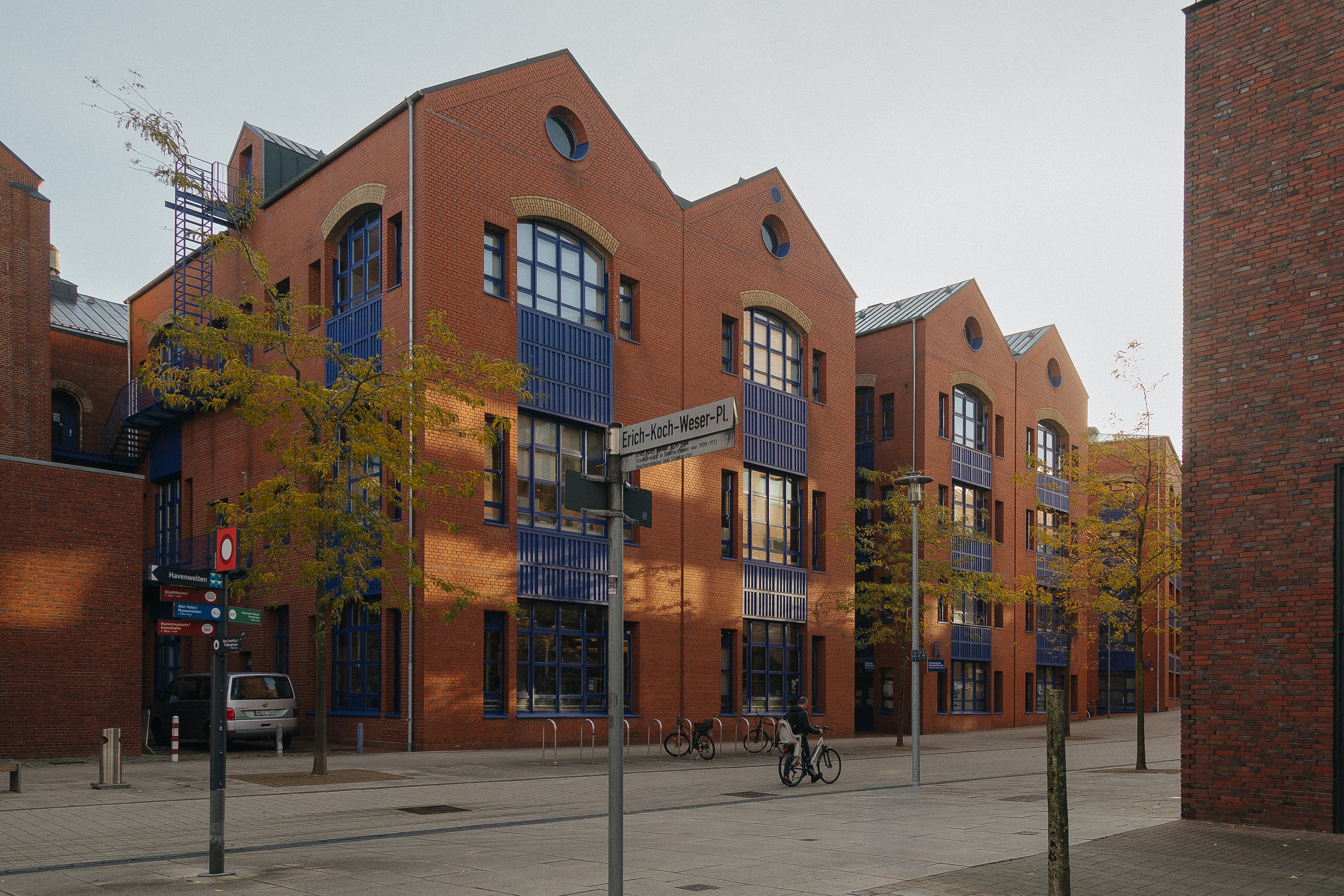
Building K (1985) facing Am Alten Hafen Street.

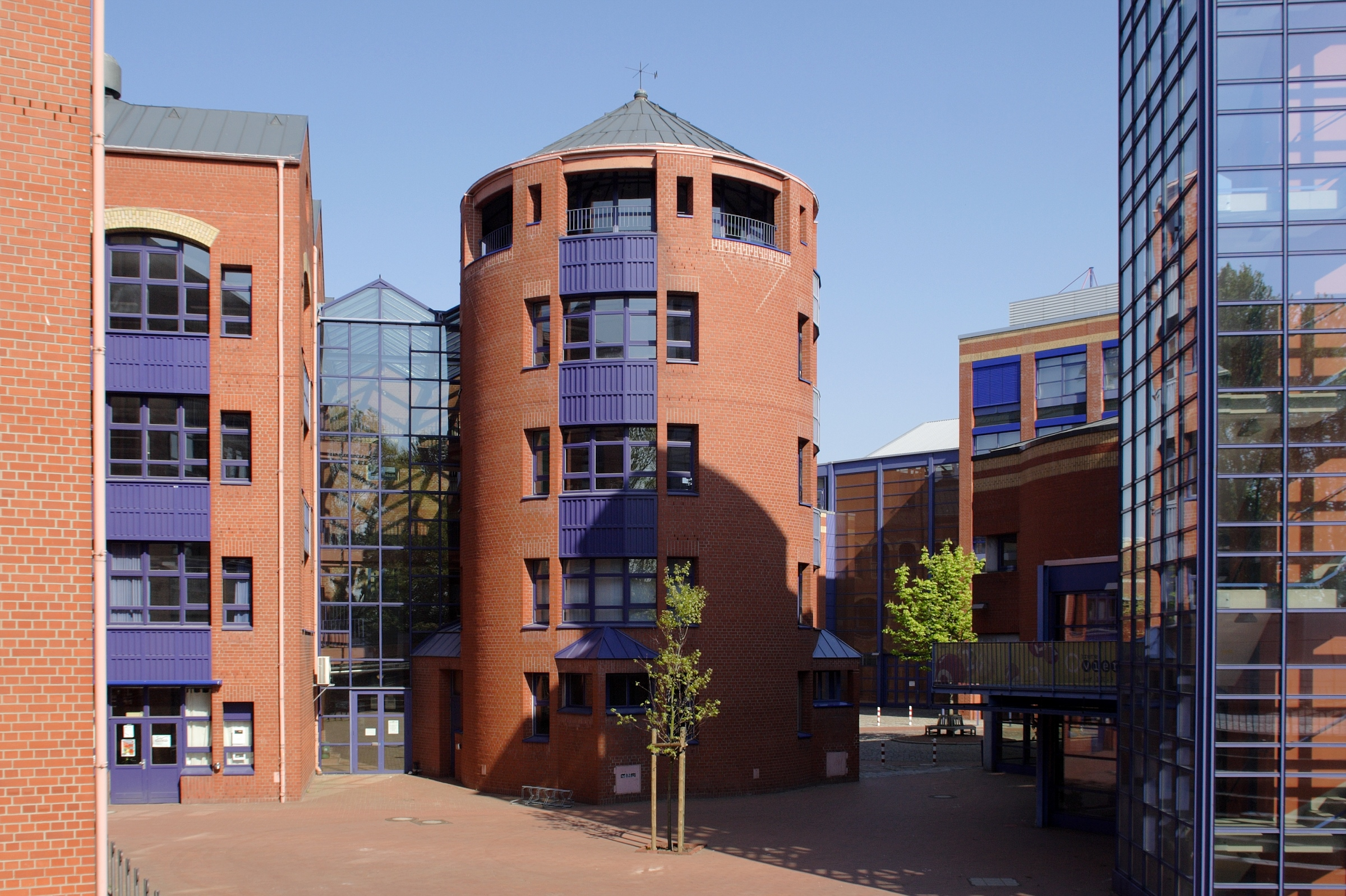
Building K with the round tower (left of center) and parts of Buildings M and Z.

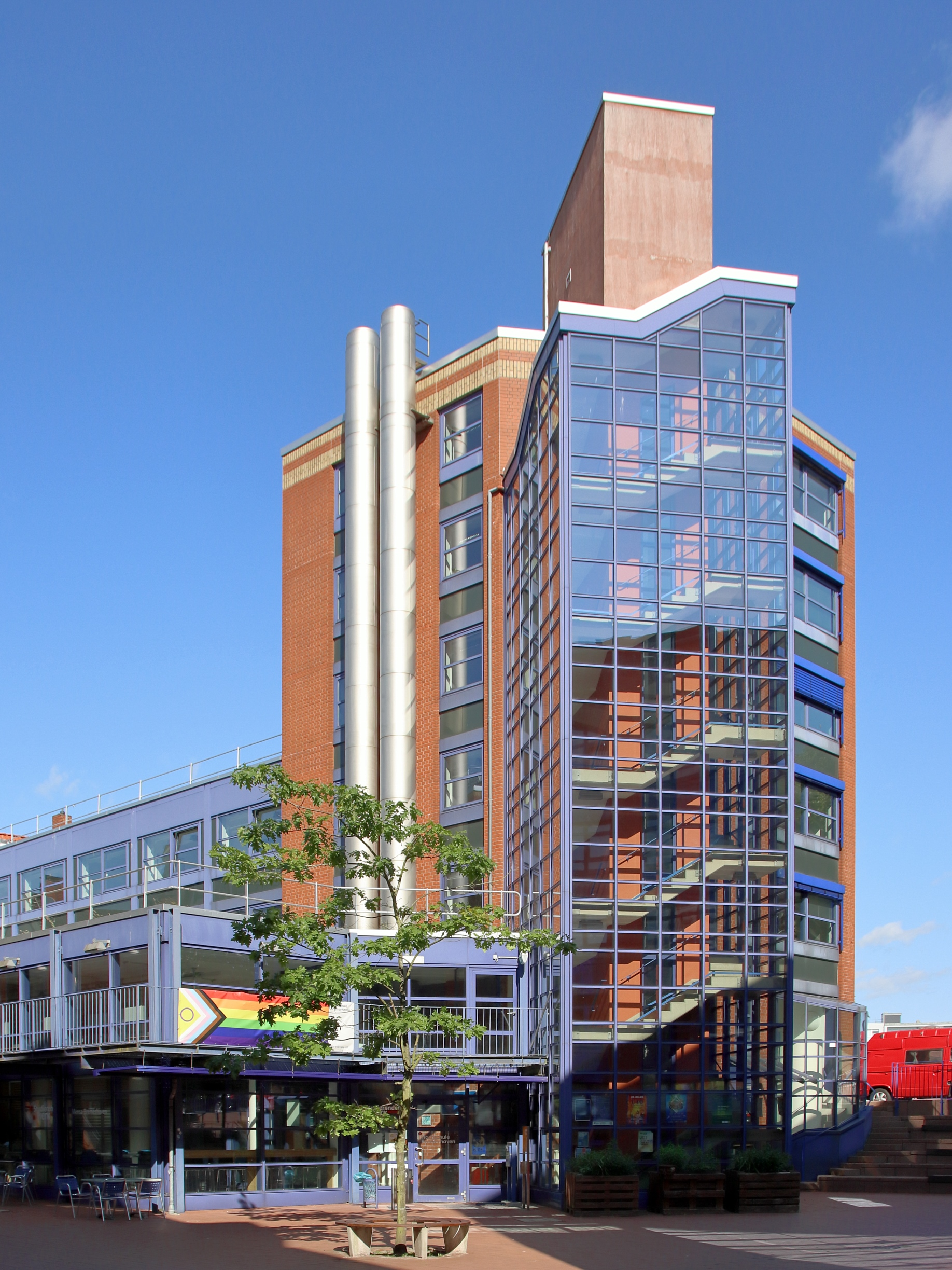
Building M

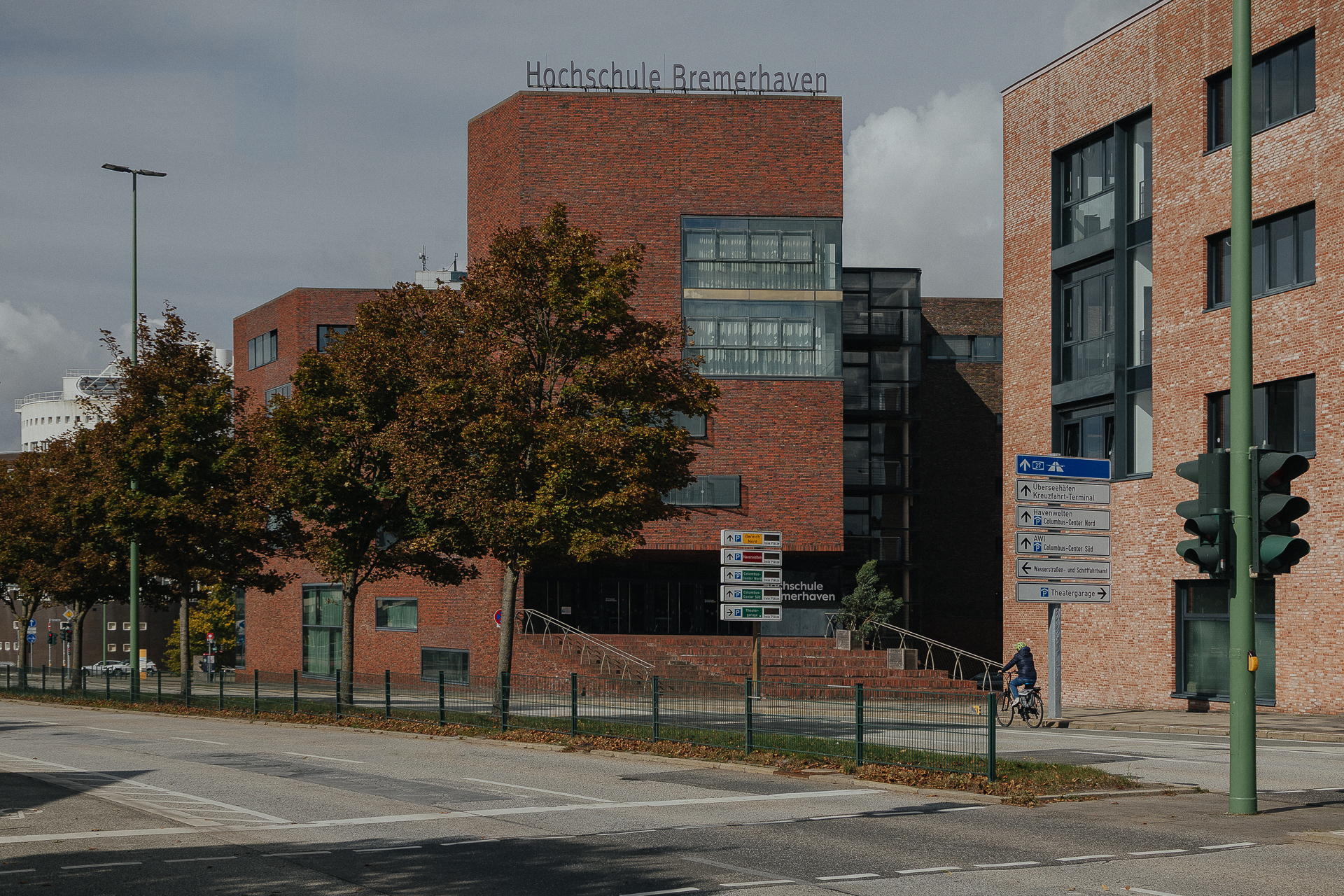
Building S from 2005.

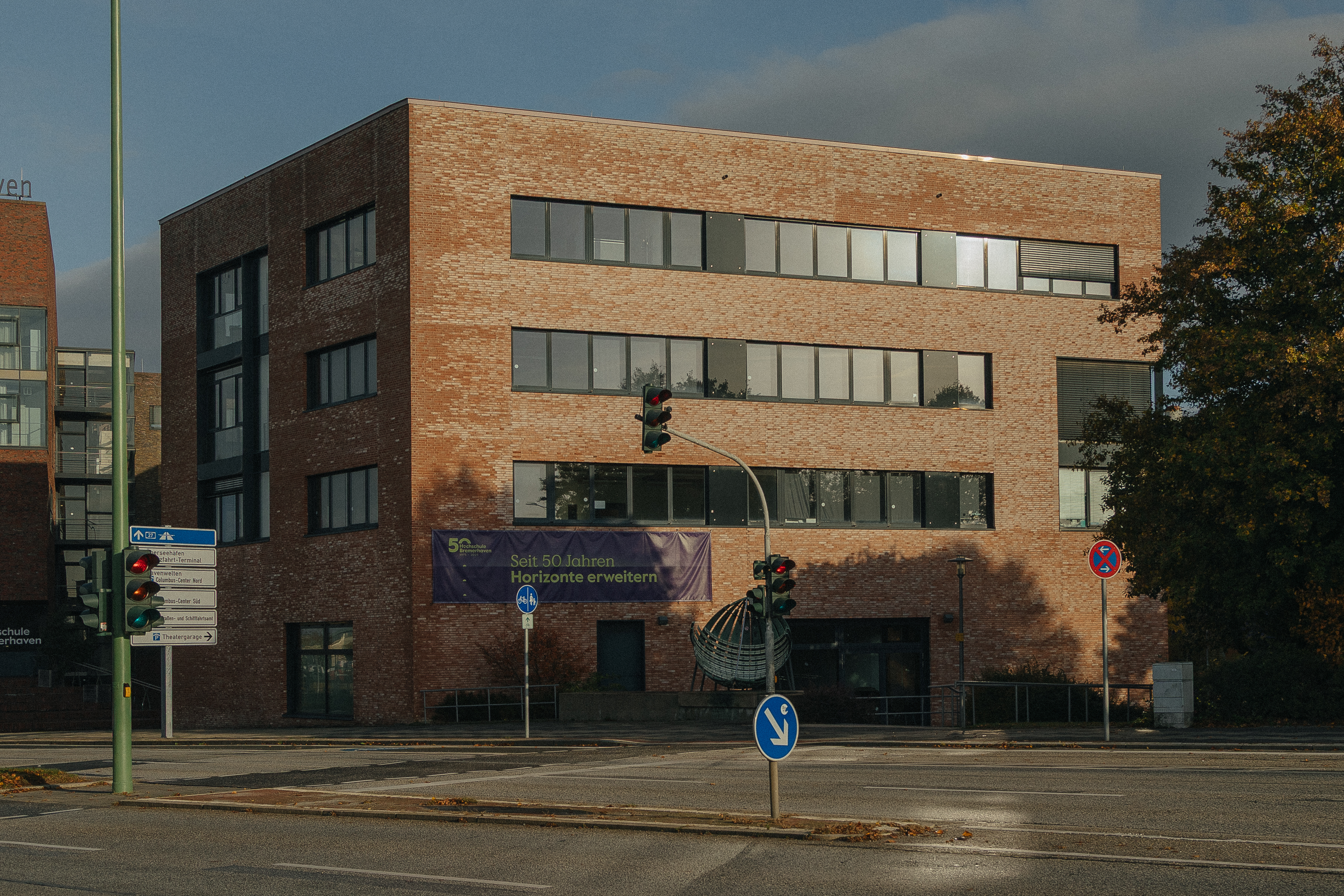
Building T from 2005.

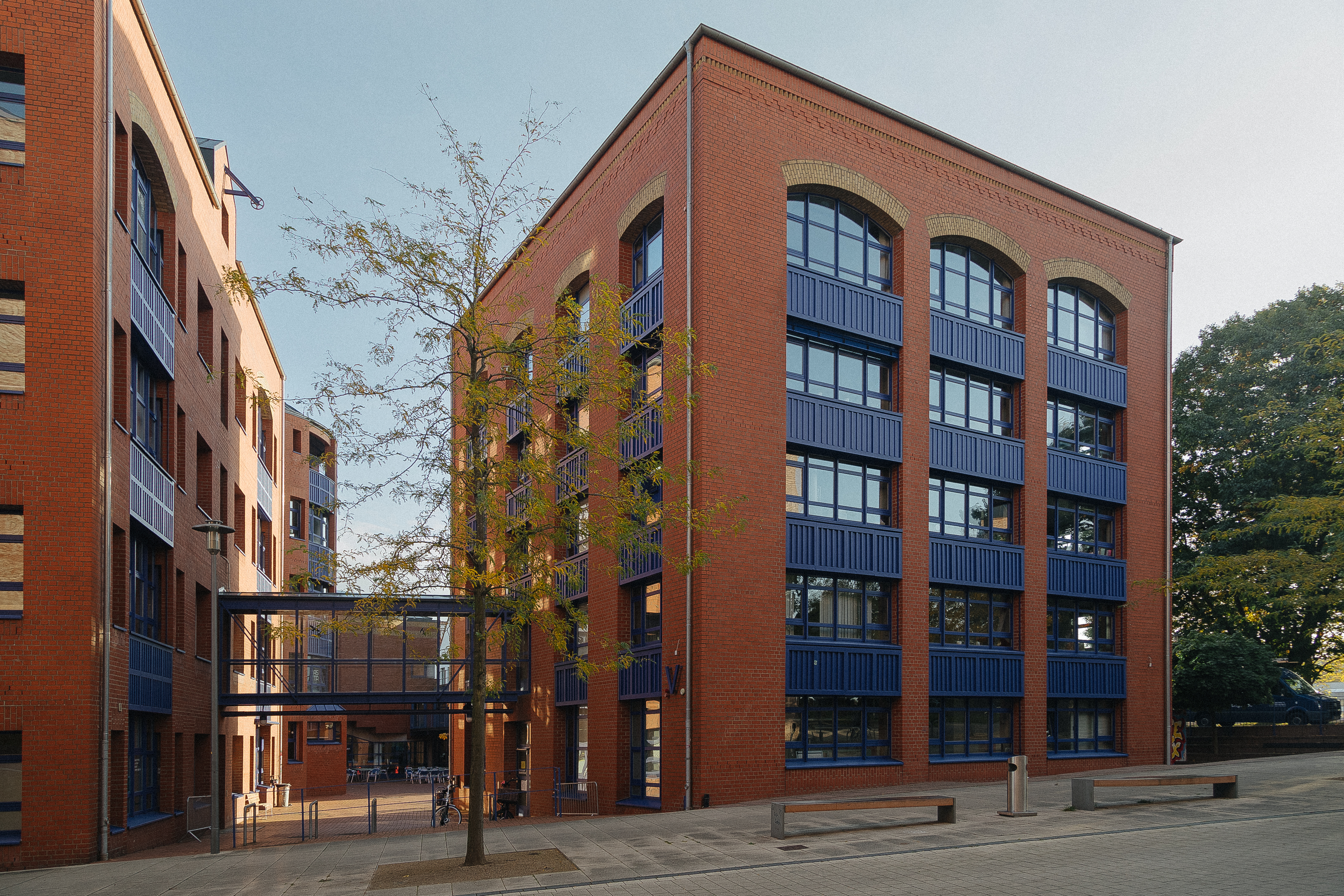
Building V from 1989.

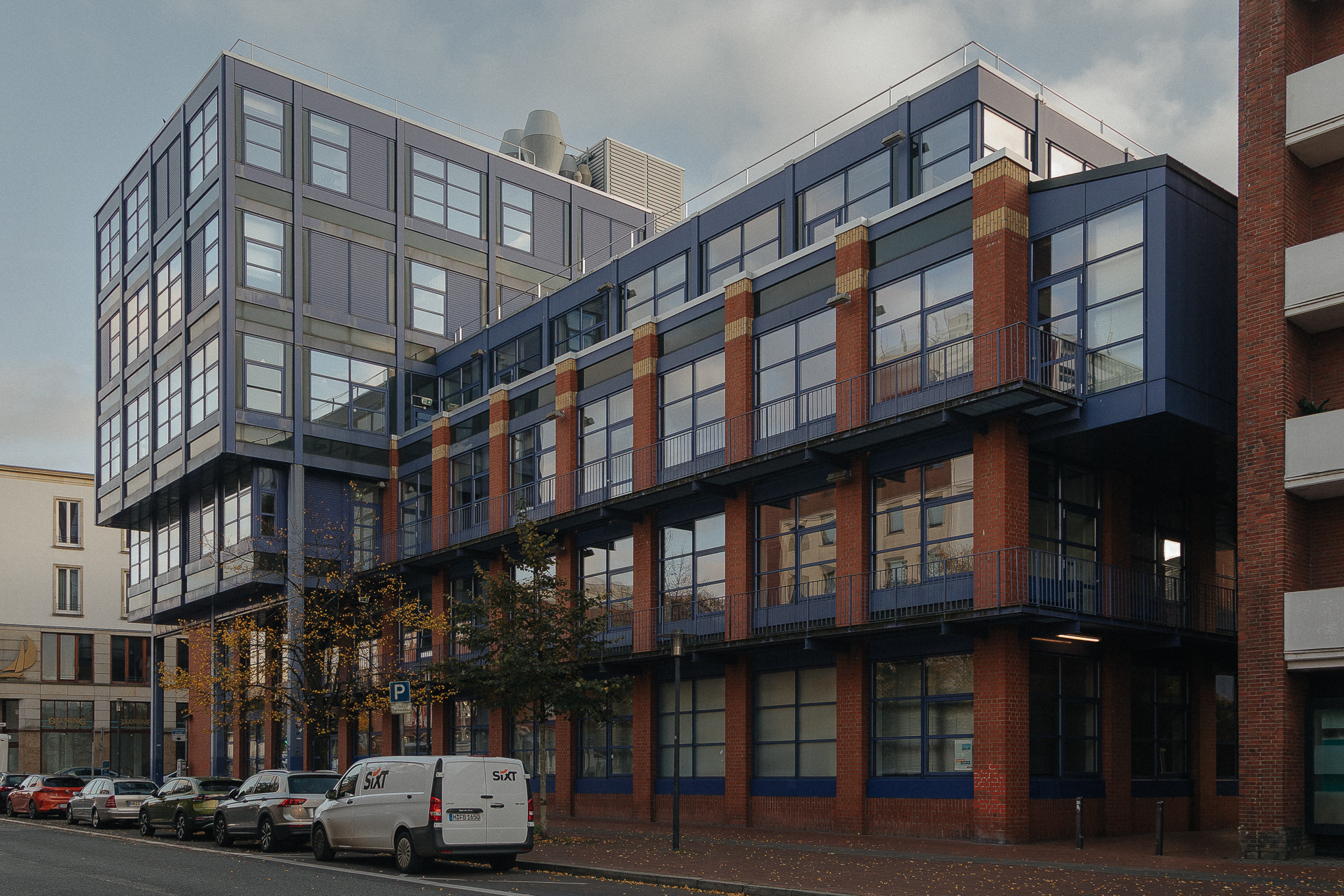
Building Z from 1998.

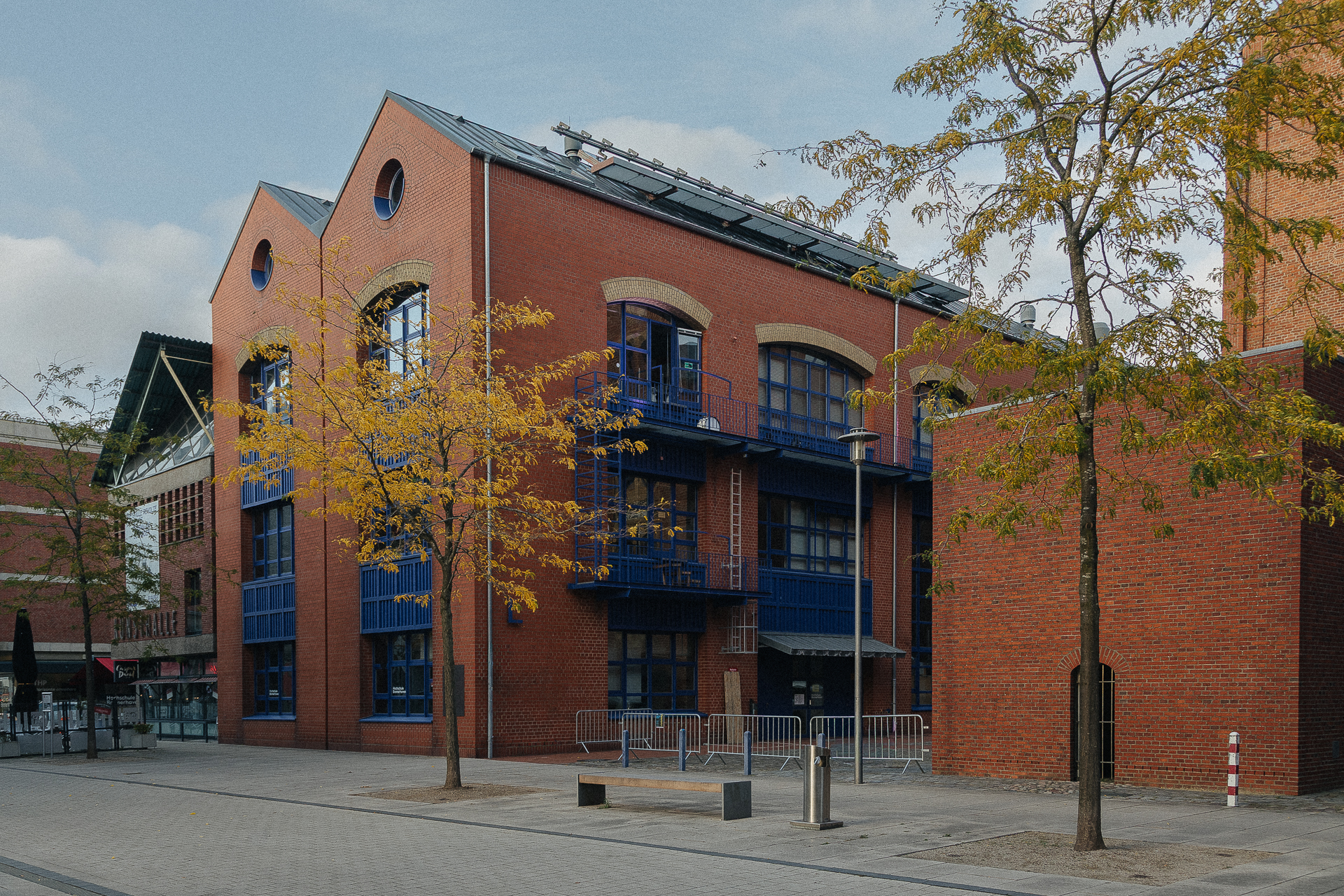
Building L.

In 1879, a navigation school was established on Bussestraße, which in 1884 became the Municipal Technical School (later the School of Ship Engineering). In Geestemünde, there was also the Prussian Sea Engineers' School on Bülowstraße. In 1927, the Bremerhaven School of Ship Engineering was incorporated into the Technical State Institutes of Bremen.

In 1960, the Bremerhaven School of Ship Engineering began classes in a three-story new building at 21 Columbus Street, which today is the renovated Building C, used as a seminar building.

Bremerhaven University of Applied Sciences was founded on September 1, 1975. The foundation for its establishment was based on

- the School of Ship Engineering from 1960, which became the Engineering Academy in 1968 and the University of Applied Sciences for Technology in 1970
- the Bremerhaven branch of the Navigation School, later Navigation Academy Bremen (1968), which in 1970 became the University of Nautical Studies Bremen with the Bremerhaven Institute.

In 1977, the German Science and Humanities Council recommended federal support for the university. In 1978, Bremerhaven University of Applied Sciences and Gdynia University of Technology signed a cooperation agreement for the training of ship officers. Further collaborations followed, including with Oldenburg University of Applied Sciences, Wilhelmshaven University of Applied Sciences, and the Cuxhaven Navigation School. In 1984, the training of graduate nautical officers (captains for long-distance shipping) ended. In the winter semester of 1974-1975, the program in operations and supply engineering was added alongside the traditional courses in navigation and ship operation engineering, and in the summer semester of 1976, the program in transport management was also introduced.

In 1983, the foundation stone was laid for the new buildings (Building M) on the site of the former Karlsburg Brewery. According to plans by the architect Gottfried Böhm, the first red-brick buildings were completed by 1985. Parts of the Emigrants' House from 1849–1850 were incorporated into the design, connecting old and new architectural elements. The round tower recalls the old fortifications of the Swedish Carlsburg Fortress from the 17th century. In 1989, a second construction phase followed, including the laboratory wing and the square tower for administration (Building V).

In 2000, 1,171 students were enrolled at the university, supported by 69 professors and 69 additional staff members. In the 2003–2004 academic year, the number of students increased to 2,064, of whom 15% were international and 29% were female.

The extension building (Building S), opened in 2005 and designed by the kister scheithauer gross architects and urban planners, was awarded the prize of the Association of German Architects in 2006. It houses the library, two lecture halls, 20 seminar rooms, the IT laboratory, and a dean's office. In 2011, Building T was completed by the same architects.

In 2014, the new cafeteria opened in Building K, occupying the rooms of the old canteen.

In 2022, the social sciences branch of the university was established with the Social Work program, designed for 150 students. This program uniquely includes a study-accompanying counseling qualification in Transactional Analysis, a first in Germany. Also in 2022, the health sciences program Physician Assistance was introduced, serving as a link in healthcare between medicine and nursing.

== Facilities ==
- The university library in Building S, with specialized literature for the degree programs, is part of the Bremen State and University Library.
- The canteen and cafeteria.
- The Central Computing Services Unit (ZBRV) in Buildings Z and S supports all faculties as well as students of the FernUniversität in Hagen.
- The General Student Committee (AStA), with the AStA Secretariat (An der Karlstadt 8), the chairpersons, and the officers, represents the interests of the students.
- The Alumni network serves the interests of graduates, current students, and the university, consisting of alumni associations as well as support and friends' groups.
- The Association for the Promotion of Bremerhaven University of Applied Sciences was founded in 1978 by Wilhelm Kröncke together with 16 other citizens of Bremerhaven.
- VdWT – Association of Industrial Engineers for Transport Management e.V.

== Institute ==
- Institute for Applied Microbiology and Biotechnology
- Institute for Media and Systems Engineering
- Institute for Automation and Electrical Engineering
- Institute for Management and Economics
- Institute for Maritime Tourism
- Institute for Mechanical and Thermal Basic Operations
- Institute for Building Services Engineering and Facility Management
- Dangerous Goods Information Center
- Institute for Food Technology and Bioprocess Engineering (at the Technology Transfer Center Bremerhaven)
- Institute for Health Technologies (at the Technology Transfer Center Bremerhaven)
- Institute for Biological Information Systems (at the Technology Transfer Center Bremerhaven)
- Institute for Organization and Software (at the Technology Transfer Center Bremerhaven)
- Institute for Water, Energy, and Landscape Management (at the Technology Transfer Center Bremerhaven)
- Life Sciences Institute
- ILRM – Institute for Logistics Law and Risk Management
- Institute for Thermal Power and Engines
- Institute of Artificial Intelligence Methods and Information Mining
- IMARE – Institute for Marine Resources
- Institute for Public-Private Partnership
- Institute for Safety and Security Studies (ISaSS)

== Locations ==
Bremerhaven University of Applied Sciences is located very centrally in the Bremerhaven-Mitte district, near Theodor-Heuss-Platz, at An der Karlstadt 8, 27568 Bremerhaven.

- Building B – Bussestrasse 24
- Building C – Columbusstraße 21, seminar rooms, ship operation engineering (1960)
- Building K – Karlsburg, seminar rooms and cafeteria, An der Karlstadt 8 (1985)
- Building L – Laboratories, workshop, An der Karlstadt 8
- Building M – Canteen and auditorium, Deichstraße (1998)
- Building S – Seminar building and library, Karlsburg 7 / Columbusstraße (2005)
- Building T – Technology, An der Karlstadt 8 / Columbusstraße (2011)
- Building THP – Administration and seminar rooms, Theodor-Heuss-Platz 3 (2019)
- Building V – Administration, An der Karlstadt 8 / Deichstraße (1989)
- Building Z – Central laboratory, An der Karlstadt 6 / Fährstraße (1998)

== Honorary Senators ==
- 1994: Hans-Dietrich Genscher, former Federal Minister, Bonn
- 2000: Wilhelm Kröncke, Bremerhaven
- 2003: Hans Rummel, Dedesdorf
- 2015: Ulrich Sander

== Awards and Prizes ==
- Red Dot Design Award in the category Corporate Identity
- Award for Gender-Equality-Oriented University in the Professors Program 2030
- ″ITRoleModelUniversity″ at the 53rd Conference of Computer Science Student Councils
