= Bremerhaven =

Bremerhaven Bremerhoben (Low German)
- City
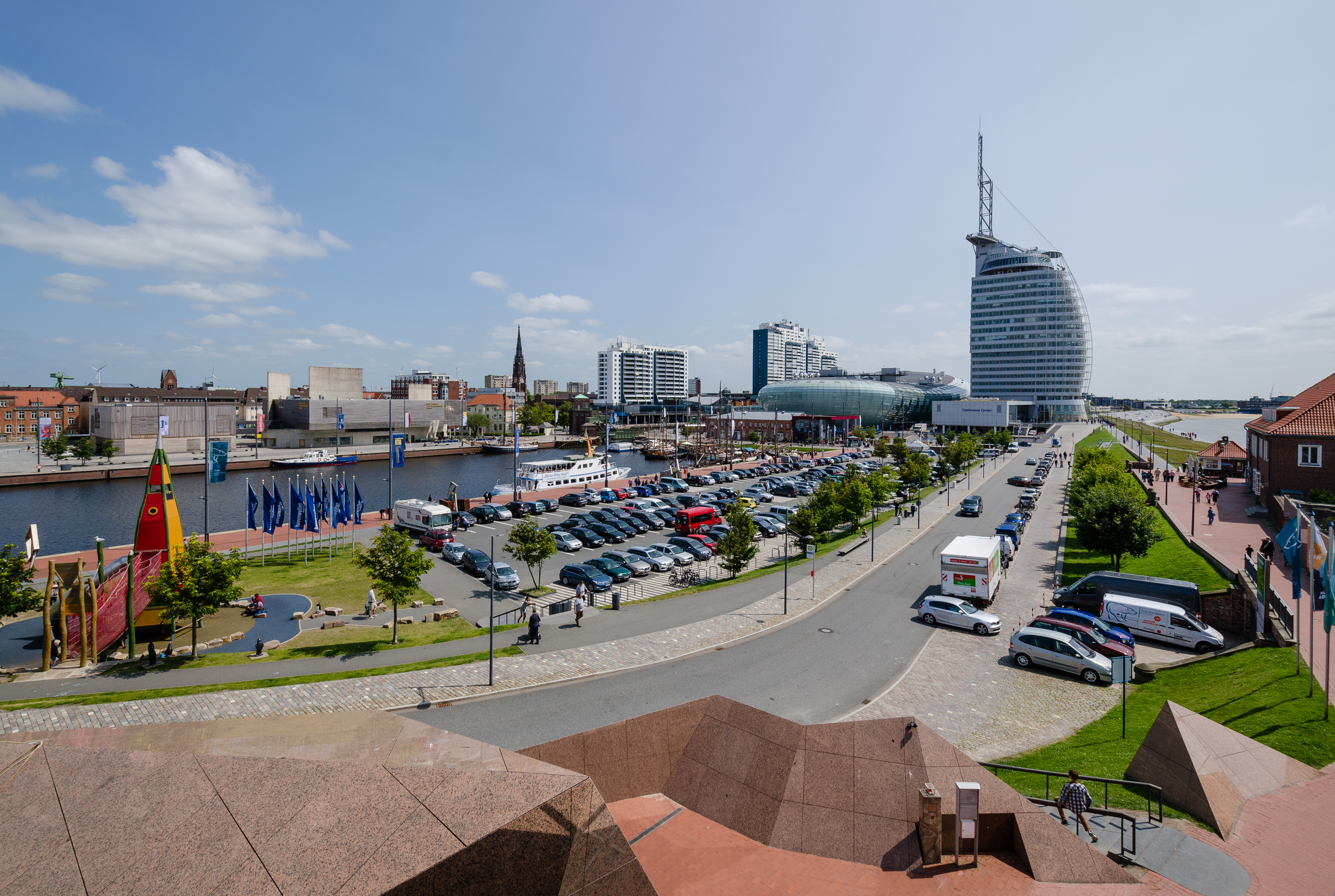
- Bremerhaven in July 2013

- Flag Coat of arms
- Interactive map of Bremerhaven
- Location within Germany Location within Bremen
- Coordinates: 53°33′N 8°35′E
- Country: Germany
- State: Bremen
- Founded: 1827
- Subdivisions: 2 boroughs with 9 districts

Government
  - Mayor: Melf Grantz (SPD)
  - Governing parties: SPD/ CDU/ FDP

Area
  - Total: 93.82 km^{2} (36.22 sq mi)
- Elevation: 2 m (6.6 ft)

Population (2025-12-31)
  - Total: 118,502
  - Density: 1,263/km^{2} (3,271/sq mi)
- Time zone: UTC+01:00 (CET)
  - Summer (DST): UTC+02:00 (CEST)
- Postal codes: 27568-27580
- Dialling codes: 0471
- Vehicle registration: HB (with 1 letter and 4 digits)
- Website: bremerhaven.de

Bremerhaven (German: [ˌbʁeːmɐˈhaːfn̩]; Low German: Bremerhoben) is a port city on the east bank of the Weser estuary in northern Germany. It forms an exclave of the city-state of Bremen. The River Geeste flows through the city before emptying into the Weser.

Bremerhaven was founded in 1827 as a seaport for Bremen, and it remains one of the busiest ports in the country. It was historically rivalled by Geestemünde [de] on the opposite side of the Geeste, which belonged to Hanover (and later Prussia). Geestemünde united with neighbouring Lehe [de] to form the city of Wesermünde [de] in 1924, and Bremerhaven was itself annexed to Wesermünde in 1939, but the entire conurbation was restored to Bremen in 1947.

== History ==
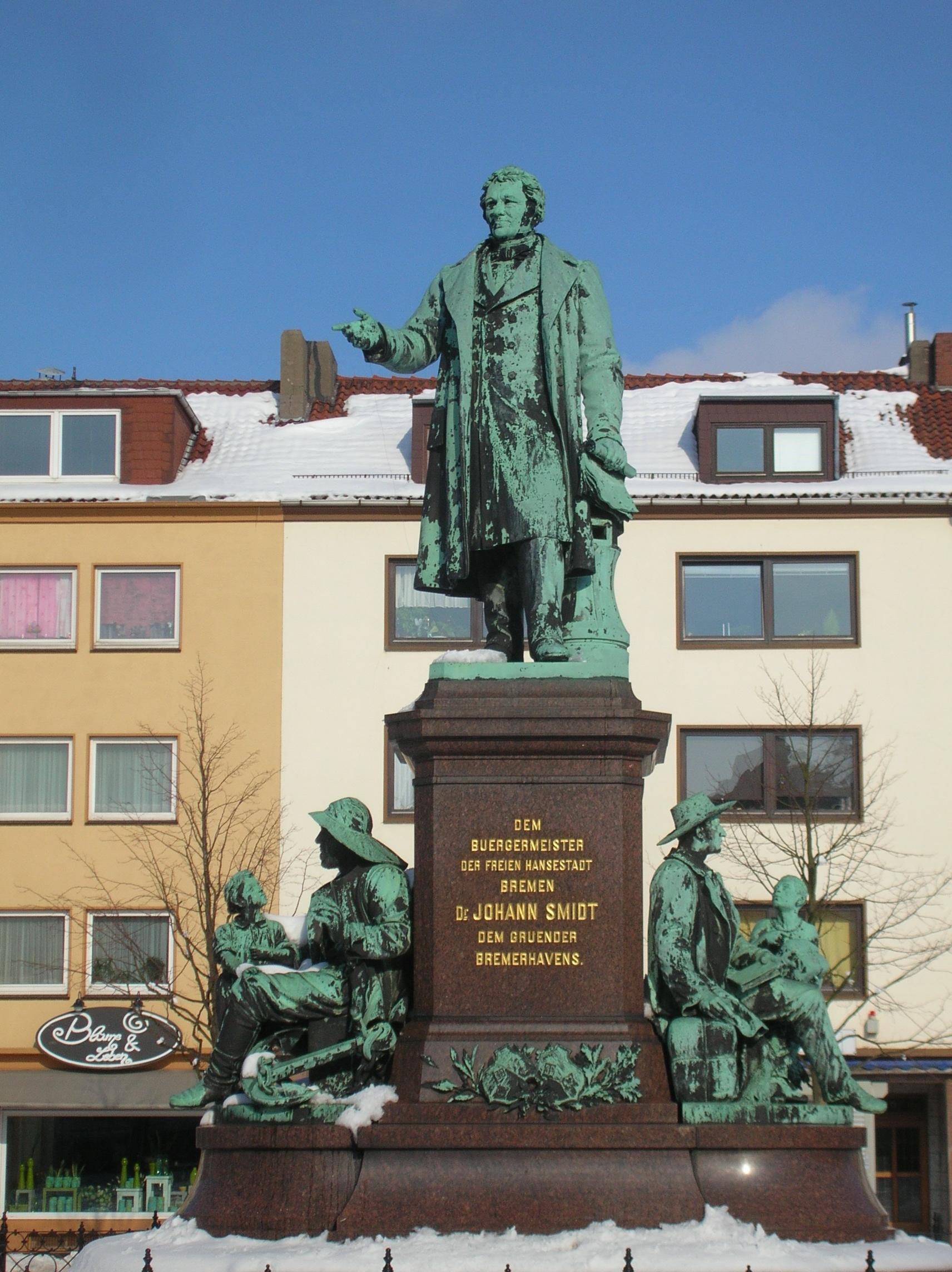
City founder Johann Smidt

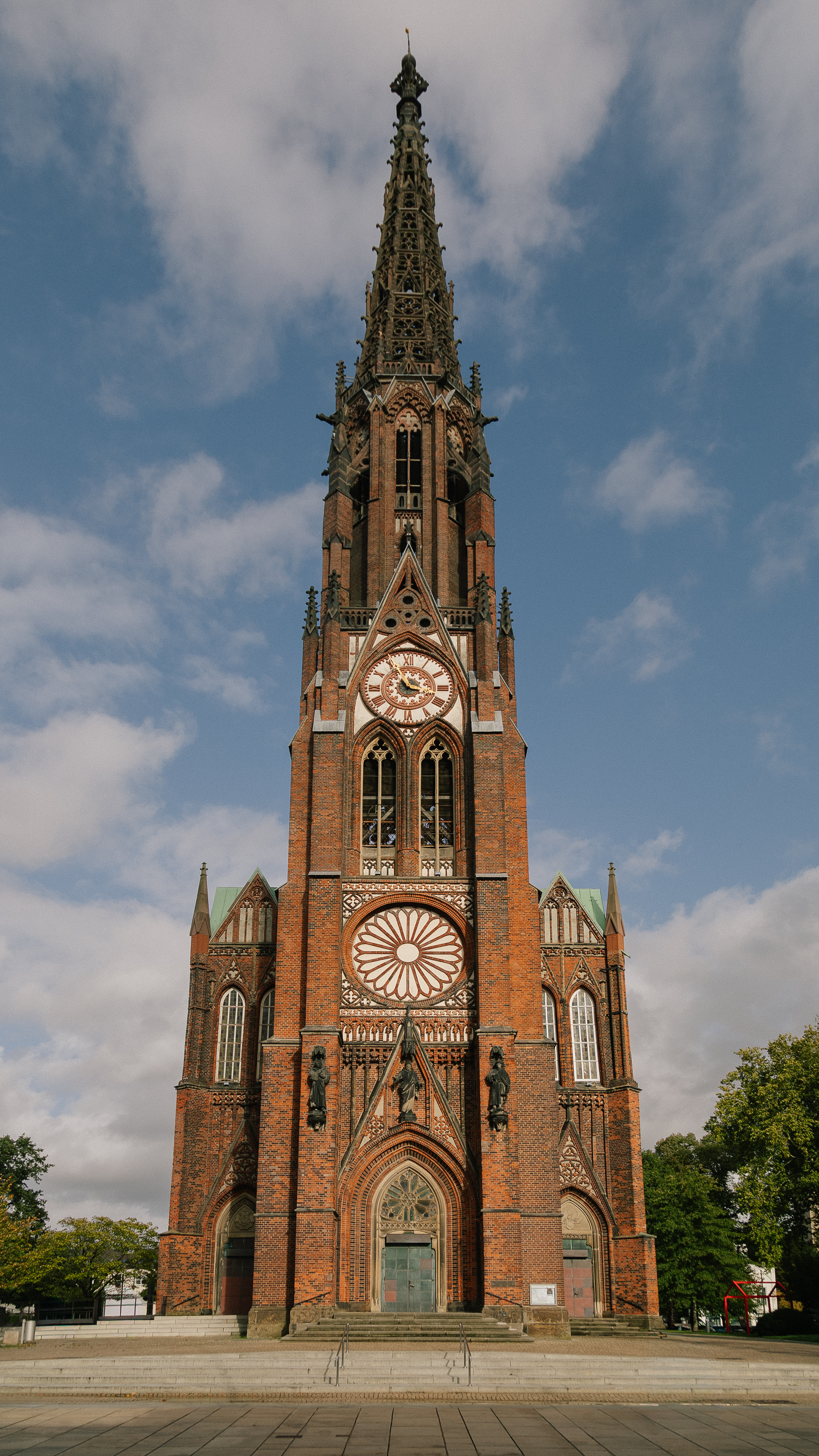
Bürgermeister-Smidt-Gedächtniskirche of the Evangelical Church of Bremen

The town was founded in 1827, but neighboring settlements such as Lehe were in the vicinity as early as the 12th century, and Geestendorf was "mentioned in documents of the ninth century". These tiny villages were built on small islands in the swampy estuary. In 1381, the city of Bremen established de facto rule over the lower Weser stream, including Lehe, later therefore called Bremerlehe. Early in 1653, Swedish Bremen-Verden's troops captured Bremerlehe by force.

The Emperor Ferdinand III ordered his vassal Christina of Sweden, then Duchess regnant of Bremen-Verden, to restitute Bremerlehe to Bremen. However, Swedish Bremen-Verden began the First Bremian War (March – July 1654). In the subsequent peace treaty (First Stade Recess; November 1654) Bremen had to cede Bremerlehe and its surroundings to Swedish Bremen-Verden. The latter developed plans to found a fortified town on the site, and much later this location became the present-day city of Bremerhaven. In 1672, under the reign of Charles XI of Sweden, in personal union Duke of Bremen-Verden—colonists tried unsuccessfully to erect a castle (named Carlsburg after Charles XI) there; this fortified structure was meant to protect, as well as control shipping heading for Bremen.

Finally, in 1827, the city of Bremen under Bürgermeister Johann Smidt bought the territories at the mouth of the Weser from the Kingdom of Hanover. Bremen sought this territory to retain its share of Germany's overseas trade, which was threatened by the silting up of the Weser around the old inland port of Bremen. Bremerhaven (literally in English: Bremer Haven/Harbour) was founded to be a haven for Bremen's merchant marine, becoming the second harbour for Bremen, despite being 50 km (31 mi) downstream. Due to trade with, and emigration to, North America, the port and the town grew quickly. In 1848, Bremerhaven became the home port of the German Confederation's Navy under Karl Rudolf Brommy.

The Kingdom of Hanover founded a rival town next to Bremerhaven and called it Geestemünde (1845). Both towns grew and established the three economic pillars of trade, shipbuilding and fishing. Following inter-state negotiations at different times, Bremerhaven's boundary was several times extended at the expense of Hanoverian territory. In 1924, Geestemünde and the neighbouring municipality of Lehe were united to become the new city of Wesermünde, and in 1939 Bremerhaven (apart from the overseas port) was removed from the jurisdiction of Bremen and made a part of Wesermünde, then a part of the Prussian Province of Hanover.

Bremerhaven was one of the important harbours of emigration in Europe.

As possibly the most critical North Sea base of the Kriegsmarine, 79% of the city was destroyed in the Allied air bombing of Bremen in World War II; however, key parts of the port were deliberately spared by the Allied forces to provide a usable harbour for supplying the Allies after the war. The Allied bombing of 18 September 1944 left the inner city largely destroyed. All of Wesermünde, including those parts which did not previously belong to Bremerhaven, was a postwar enclave run by the United States, separate to but within the British zone of northern Germany. Most of the US military units and their personnel were assigned to the city's Carl Schurz Kaserne. One of the longest based US units at the Kaserne was a US military radio and TV station, an "Amerikanischer Soldatensender", AFN Bremerhaven, which broadcast for 48 years. In 1993, the Kaserne was vacated by the US military and returned to the German government.

In 1947, the city became part of the federal state Free Hanseatic City of Bremen and was consequently renamed from Wesermünde to Bremerhaven. Today, Bremerhaven is a city in its own right, but also part of the city-state of Bremen, which is for all intents and purposes a state comprising two cities. In addition to being part of the federal state, the city of Bremen has owned the "overseas port" within Bremerhaven since 1927. This and other parts of Bremerhaven owned by the city of Bremen are known as stadtbremisch. To complicate matters, a treaty between the two cities (as mentioned in Section 8 of Bremerhaven's municipal constitution) makes Bremerhaven responsible for the municipal administration of those parts owned directly by Bremen.

== Economy ==
Frosta AG, a frozen food company which is a market leader in Germany and one of the largest frozen food companies in Europe, as well as Nordsee, one of Europe's leading fish restaurant chains, are headquartered in Bremerhaven. BLG Logistics operates Europe's largest car transshipment center and car workshop in the city.

The port of Bremerhaven is the sixteenth-largest container port in the world and the fourth-largest in Europe with 4.9 million twenty-foot equivalent units (TEU) of cargo handled in 2007 and 5.5 million in 2015. The container terminal is situated on the bank of the river Weser opening to the North Sea. In the wet dock parts, accessible by two large locks, more than 2 million cars are imported or exported every year with 2.3 million in 2014. Bremerhaven imports and exports more cars than any other city in Europe. Another million tons of "High-and-Heavy" goods are handled with ro-ro ships. In 2011 a new panamax-sized lock has replaced the 1897 Kaiserschleuse, then the largest lock worldwide.

== Gallery ==
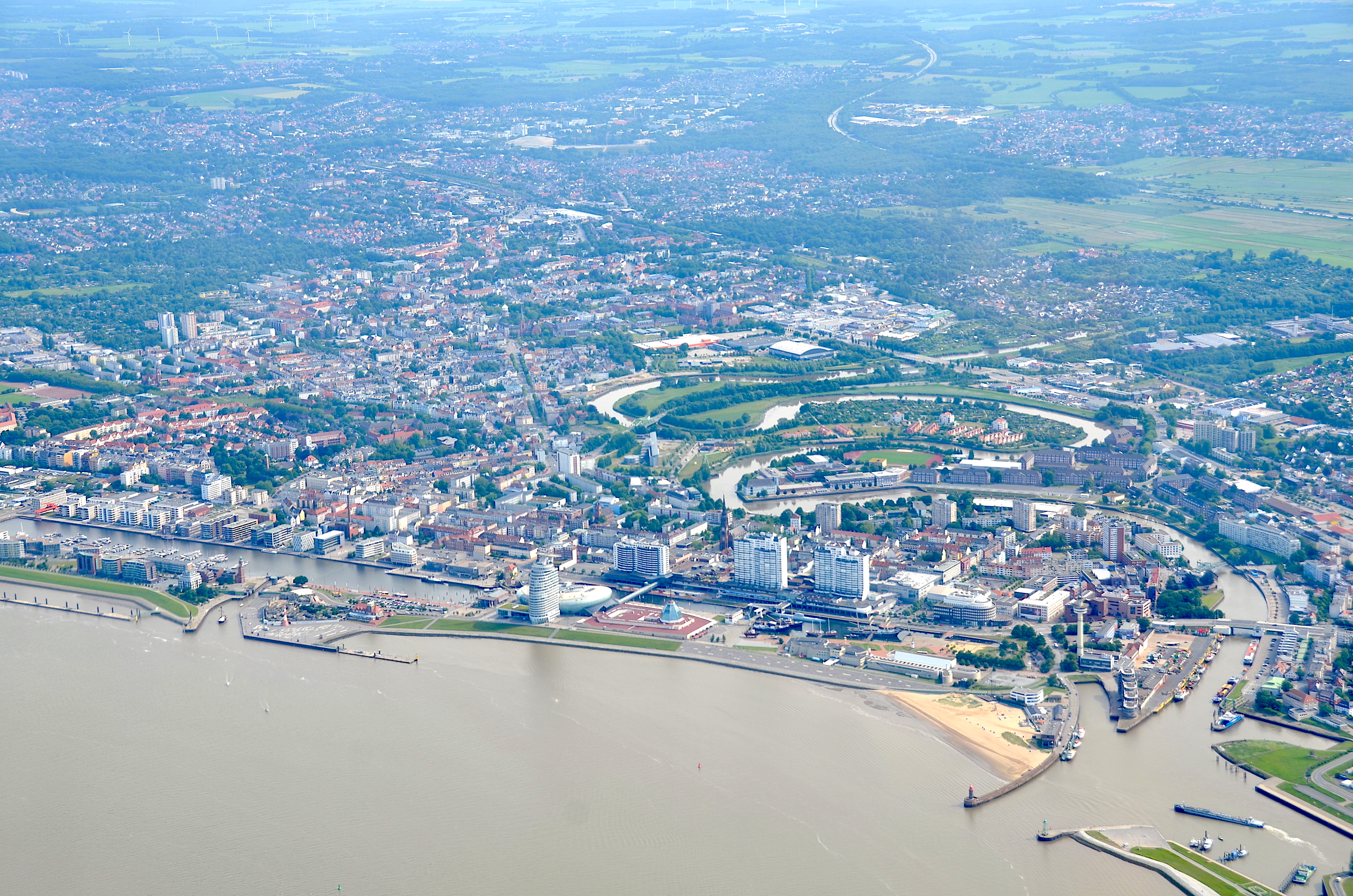
Aerial view of Bremerhaven

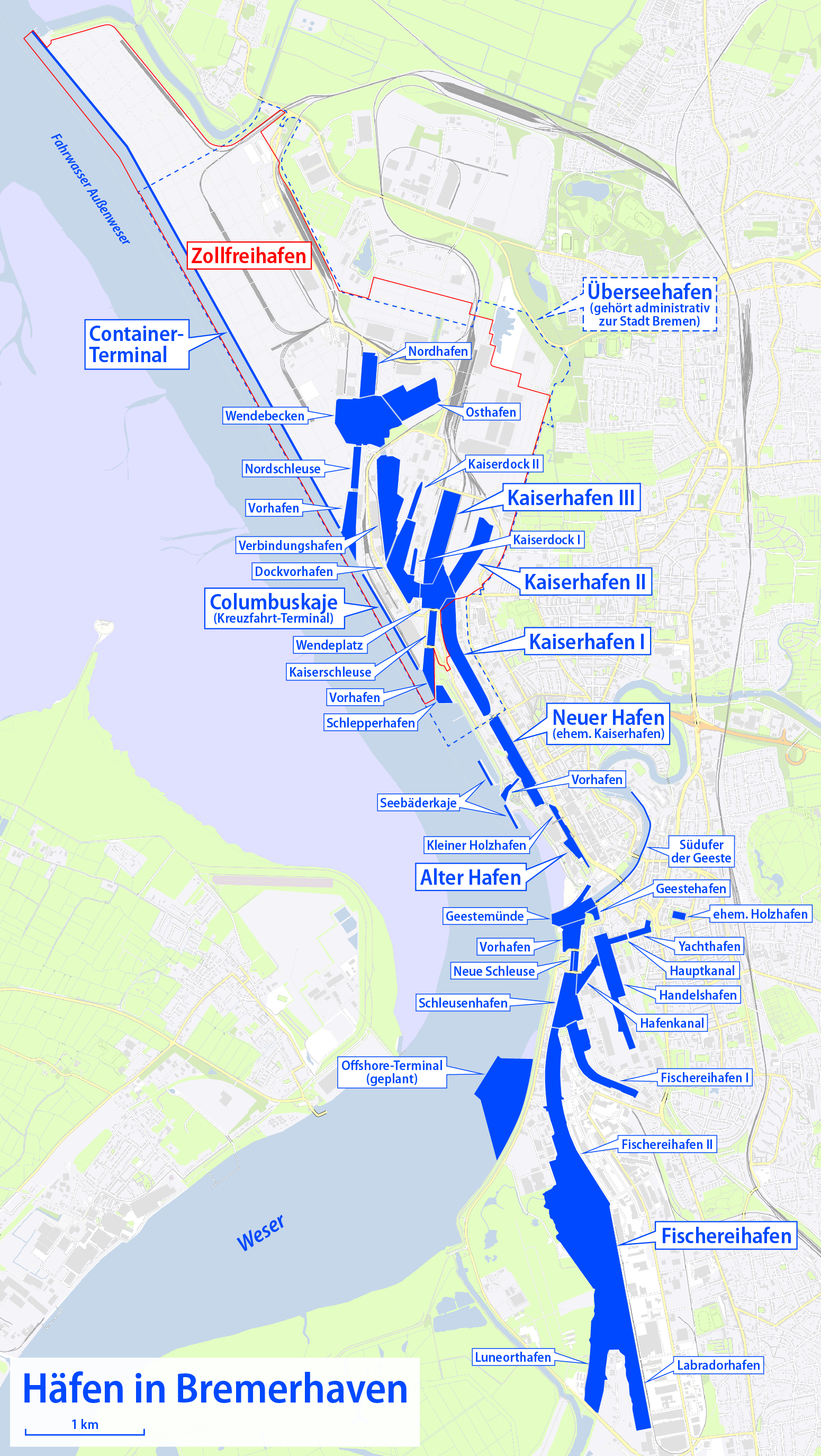
Harbors of Bremerhaven

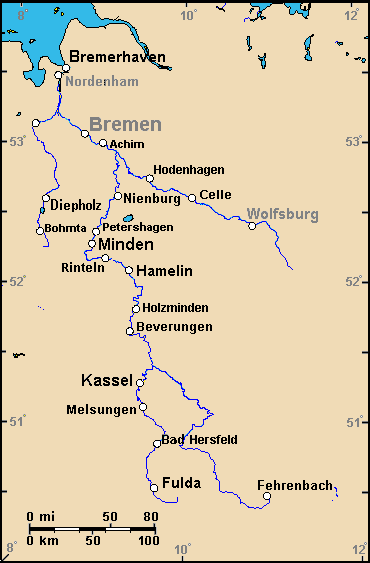
The river Weser flows by Bremen to the estuary at Bremerhaven (top)

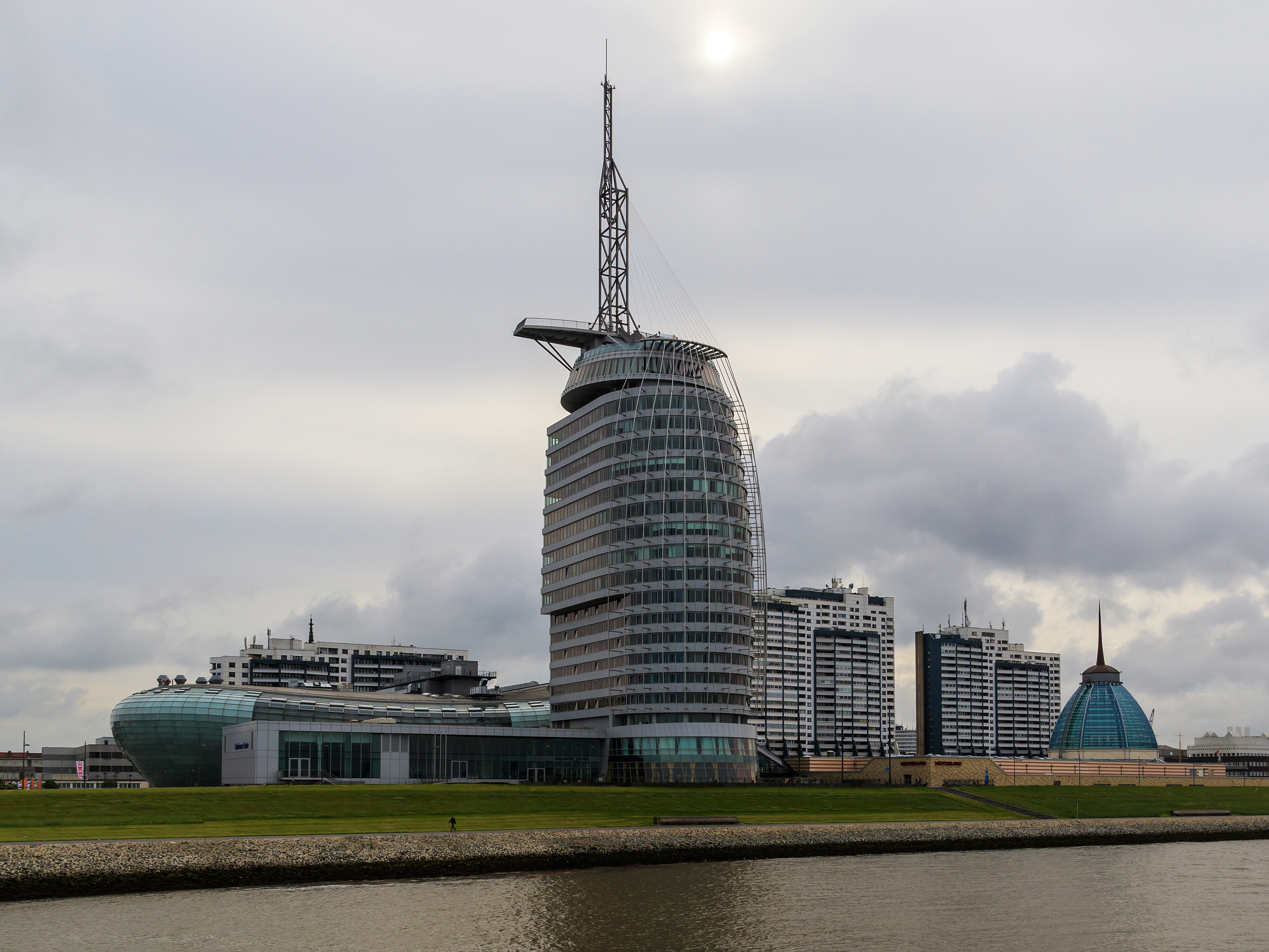
Skyline of Havenwelten-district

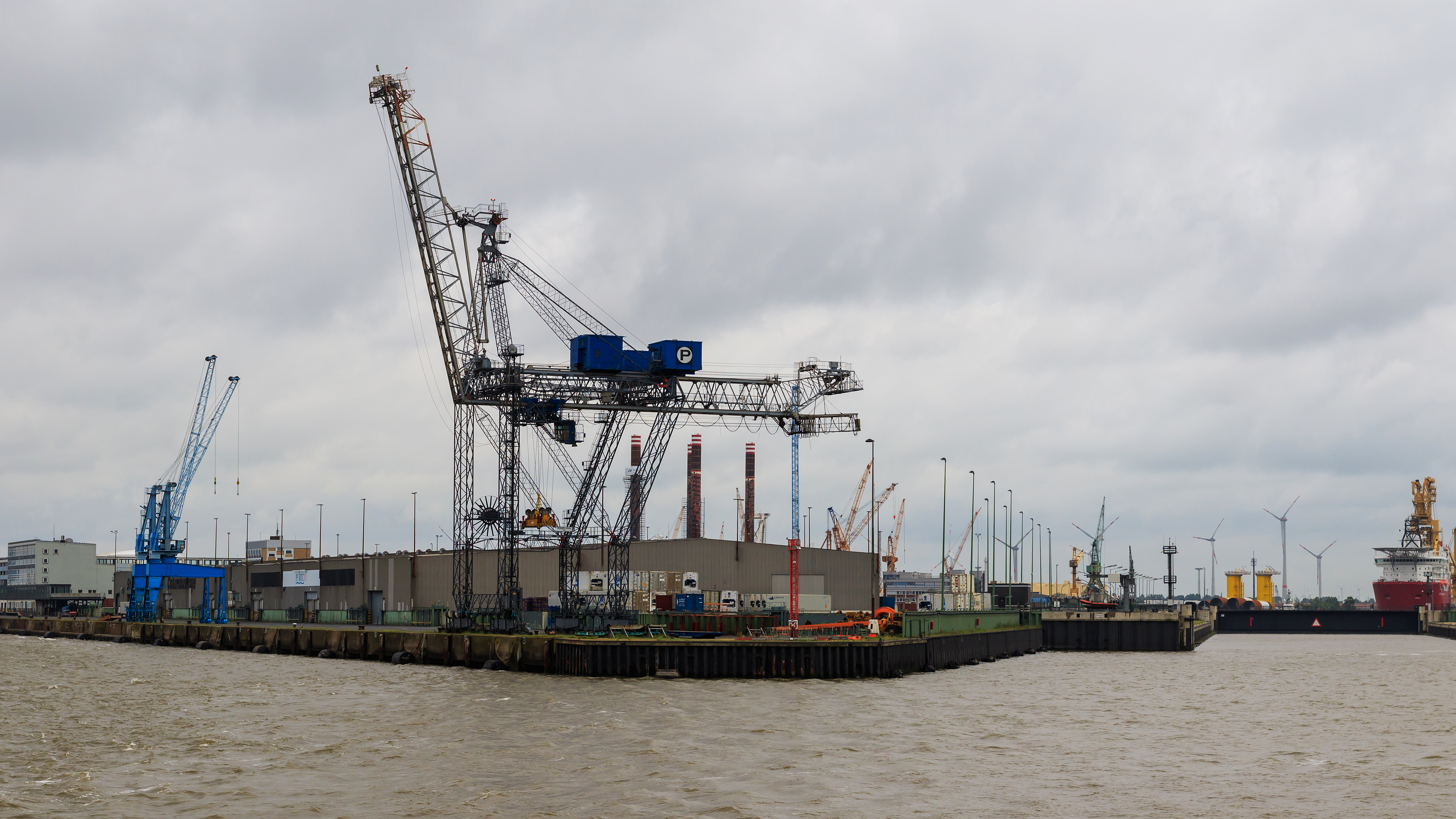
Overseas port of Bremerhaven

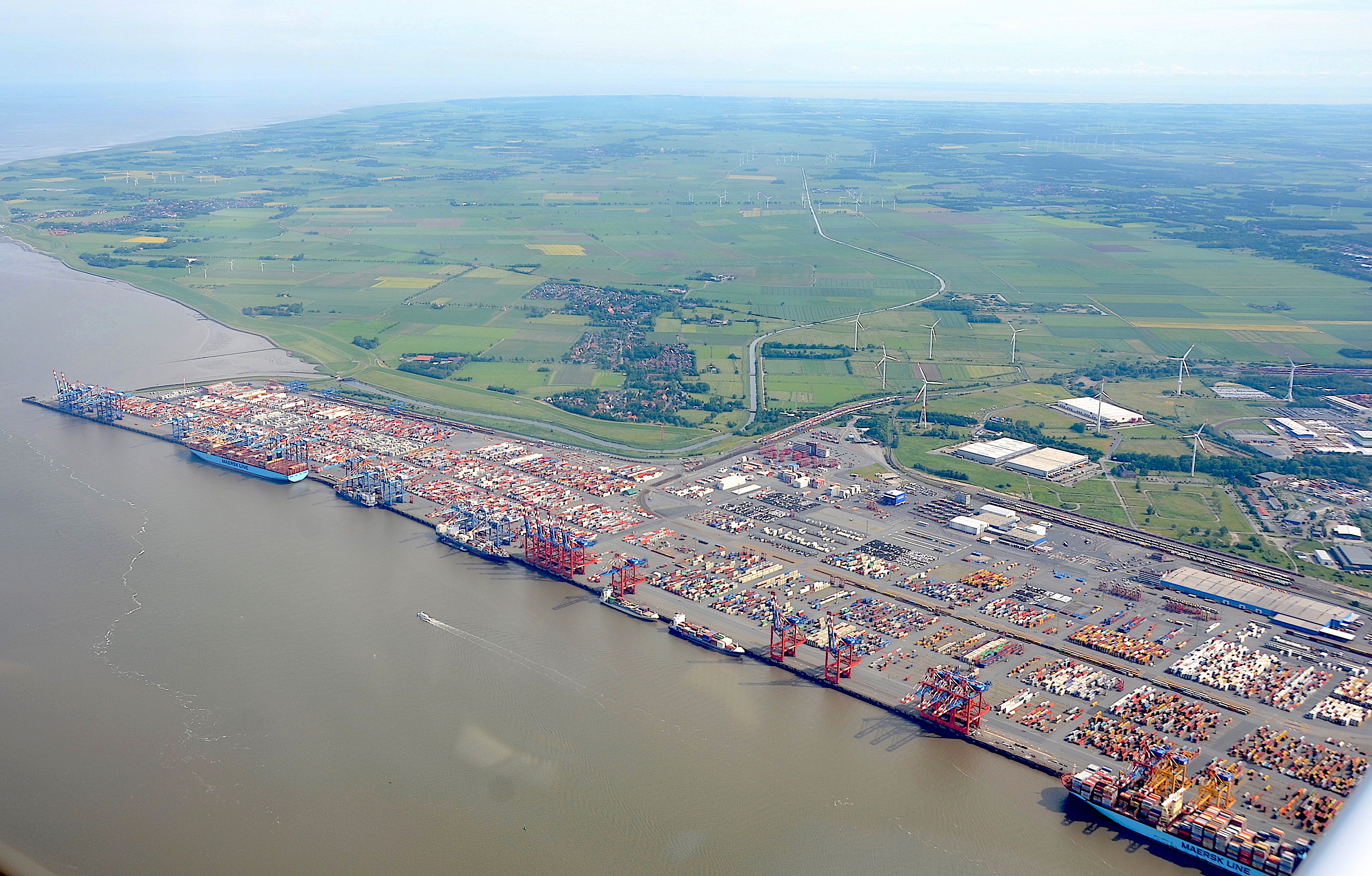
Bremerhaven container port

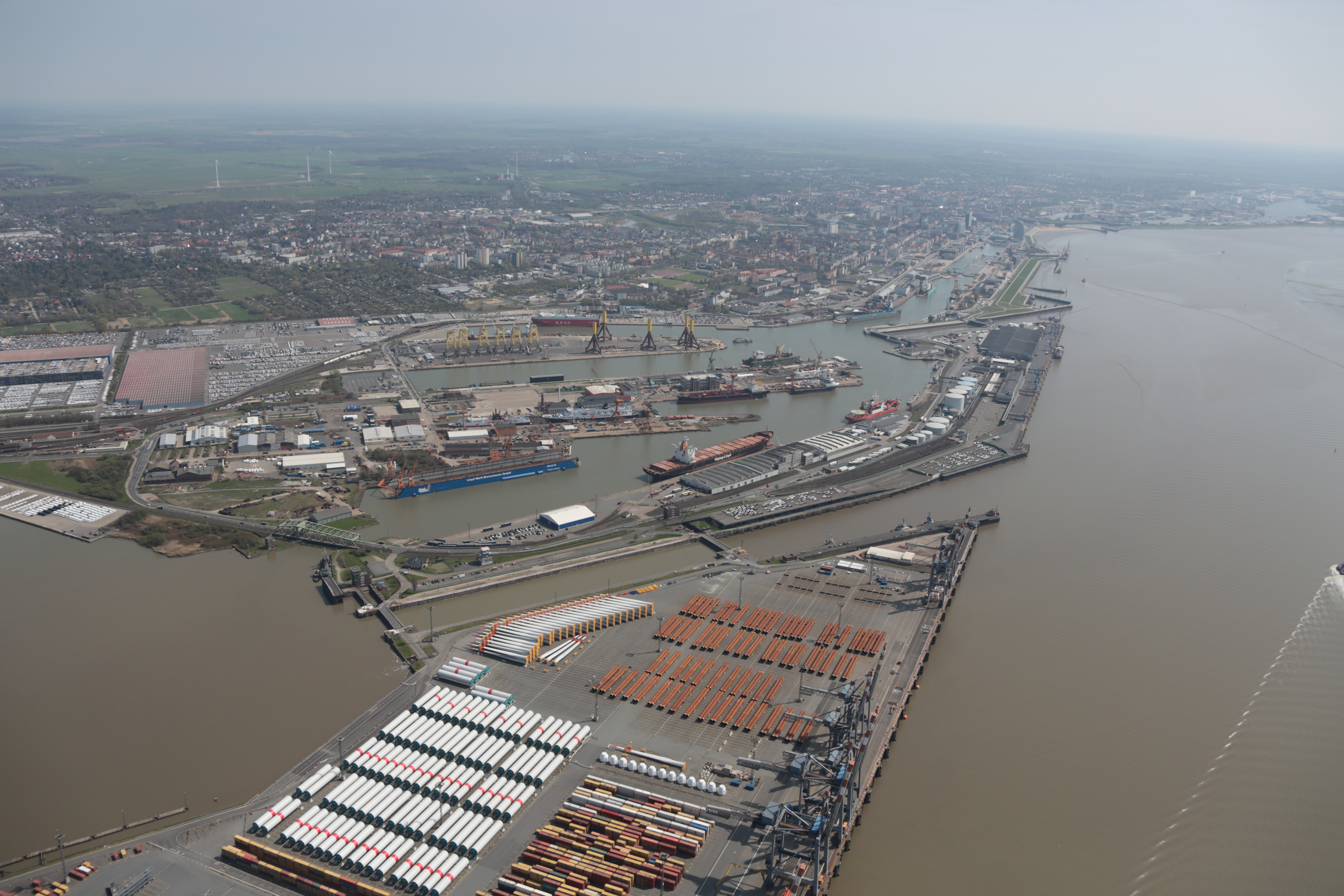
Locks and docks around Lloyd Werft

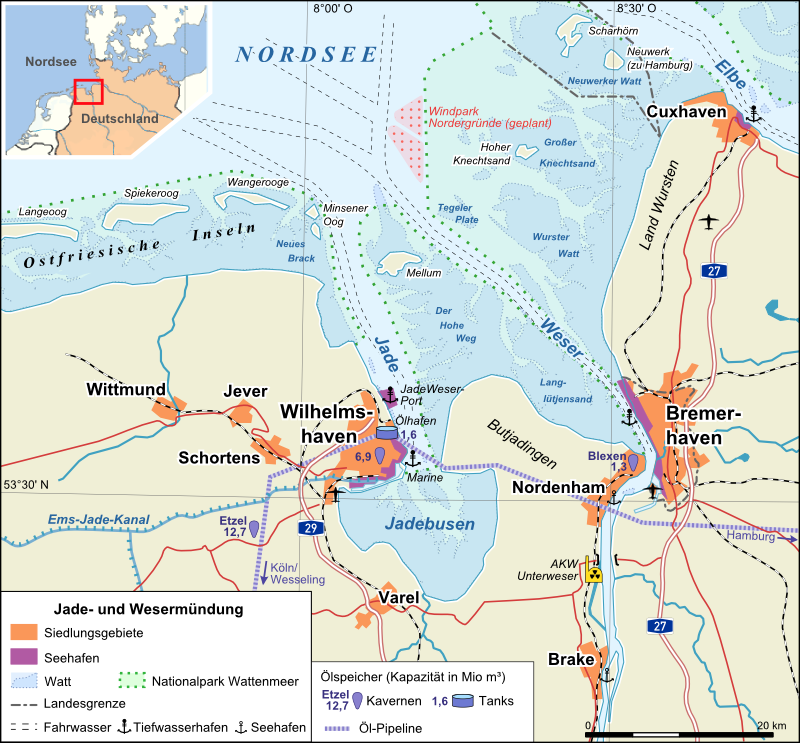
Bremerhaven on the east bank of the Weser

== Climate ==
Bremerhaven has a temperate maritime climate; severe frost and heat waves with temperatures above 30 °C (86 °F) are rare. On average, the city receives about 751 mm (29.6 in) of precipitation distributed throughout the year, with a slight peak in the summer months between June and August and a slightly drier season in late winter and early spring. Snow does fall in winter and early spring and, more rarely, in late autumn. However, it usually does not stay on the ground for long. The hottest temperature ever recorded was 35.9 °C (96.6 °F) on 20 July 2022, and the coldest was −18.6 °C (−1.5 °F) on 25 February 1956.

Climate data for Bremerhaven (1991–2020 normals). Extremes 1949-2026
| Month | Jan | Feb | Mar | Apr | May | Jun | Jul | Aug | Sep | Oct | Nov | Dec | Year |
|---|---|---|---|---|---|---|---|---|---|---|---|---|---|
| Record high °C (°F) | 13.6 (56.5) | 17.2 (63.0) | 22.5 (72.5) | 28.9 (84.0) | 31.7 (89.1) | 35.8 (96.4) | 35.9 (96.6) | 35.8 (96.4) | 30.8 (87.4) | 26.0 (78.8) | 18.8 (65.8) | 14.0 (57.2) | 35.9 (96.6) |
| Mean daily maximum °C (°F) | 4.5 (40.1) | 5.1 (41.2) | 8.3 (46.9) | 13.2 (55.8) | 16.8 (62.2) | 19.6 (67.3) | 22.0 (71.6) | 22.1 (71.8) | 18.5 (65.3) | 13.7 (56.7) | 8.5 (47.3) | 5.3 (41.5) | 13.1 (55.6) |
| Daily mean °C (°F) | 2.5 (36.5) | 2.9 (37.2) | 5.3 (41.5) | 9.4 (48.9) | 13.1 (55.6) | 16.1 (61.0) | 18.4 (65.1) | 18.4 (65.1) | 15.1 (59.2) | 10.8 (51.4) | 6.4 (43.5) | 3.4 (38.1) | 10.1 (50.2) |
| Mean daily minimum °C (°F) | 0.5 (32.9) | 0.6 (33.1) | 2.5 (36.5) | 5.8 (42.4) | 9.5 (49.1) | 12.7 (54.9) | 15.0 (59.0) | 15.0 (59.0) | 12.0 (53.6) | 8.1 (46.6) | 4.2 (39.6) | 1.5 (34.7) | 7.3 (45.1) |
| Record low °C (°F) | −17.2 (1.0) | −18.6 (−1.5) | −14.6 (5.7) | −4.9 (23.2) | −1.1 (30.0) | 3.0 (37.4) | 7.1 (44.8) | 7.5 (45.5) | 3.6 (38.5) | −2.1 (28.2) | −10.2 (13.6) | −15.6 (3.9) | −18.6 (−1.5) |
| Average precipitation mm (inches) | 62.0 (2.44) | 47.9 (1.89) | 48.6 (1.91) | 36.2 (1.43) | 49.8 (1.96) | 72.4 (2.85) | 84.1 (3.31) | 77.9 (3.07) | 72.1 (2.84) | 67.6 (2.66) | 63.9 (2.52) | 71.2 (2.80) | 751.3 (29.58) |
| Average precipitation days (≥ 0.1 mm) | 18.4 | 16.1 | 15.8 | 13.1 | 14.0 | 15.9 | 15.8 | 16.6 | 15.6 | 16.6 | 18.0 | 19.3 | 194.4 |
| Average snowy days (≥ 1.0 cm) | 3.4 | 3.7 | 1.5 | 0 | 0 | 0 | 0 | 0 | 0 | 0 | 0.1 | 3.0 | 11.3 |
| Average relative humidity (%) | 87.5 | 84.7 | 80.6 | 74.0 | 73.3 | 75.5 | 75.7 | 75.8 | 79.1 | 82.8 | 87.3 | 88.9 | 80.2 |
| Mean monthly sunshine hours | 46.3 | 69.0 | 121.2 | 184.9 | 219.4 | 204.7 | 217.3 | 200.3 | 149.6 | 105.4 | 52.2 | 38.1 | 1,604.8 |
Source 1: NOAA
Source 2: Deutscher Wetterdienst, European Climate Assessment and Dataset, and Dekadenrekorde deutscher Städte

== Transport ==
Road map of Bremerhaven and the port of Bremen

=== Roads ===
Due to its unique geographic situation, Bremerhaven suffers from a few transportation difficulties. The city has been connected to the autobahn network since the late 1970s. The A 27 runs north–south, east of the city, connecting Bremerhaven to Bremen and Cuxhaven. Road connections to Hamburg, however, are poor. The Bundesstraße 71 and secondary roads therefore carry most of the heavy lorry traffic. A proposed solution is the construction of the A 22, the so-called Küstenautobahn (or "coastal motorway"), which would link Bremerhaven to Hamburg and Wilhelmshaven/Oldenburg (using the Weser tunnel). Roads leading to the overseas port are frequently overloaded with freight traffic, and solutions are presently being discussed, including a deep-cut road favoured by the city government and various interest groups.

=== Railway ===
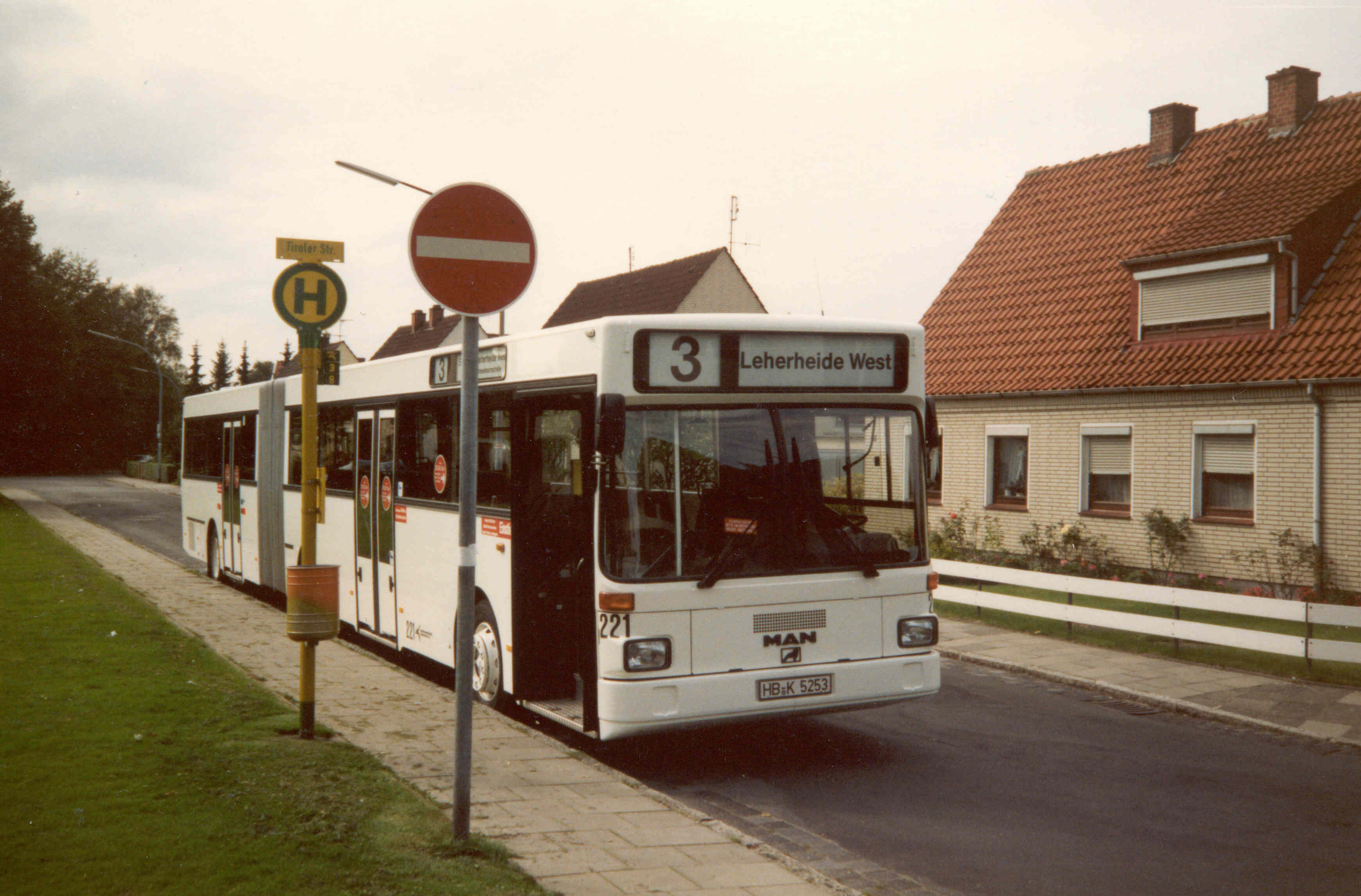
Bus in Bremerhaven, Final stop Tiroler Str.

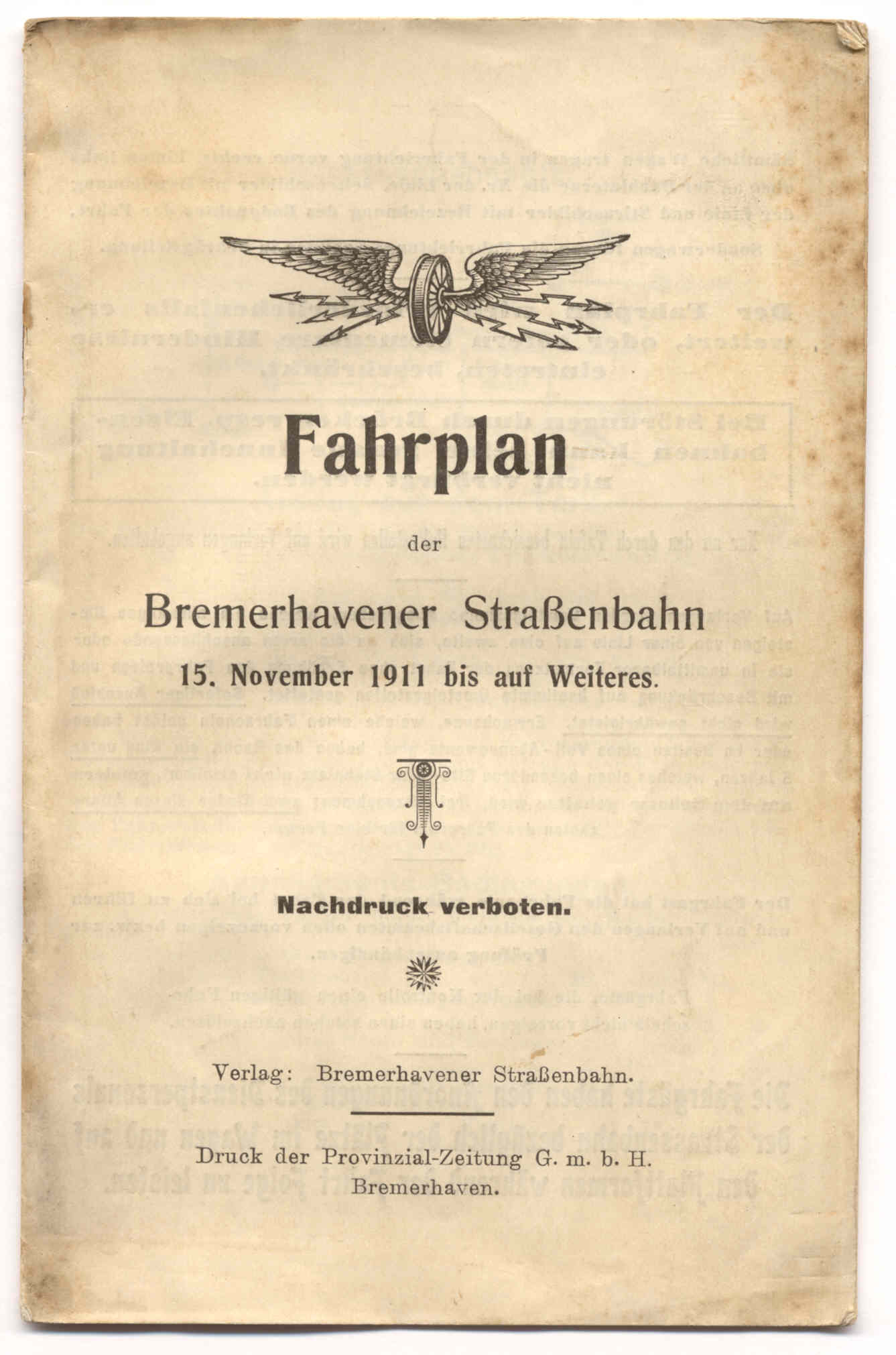
Timetable Tram 1911

Bremerhaven has three active passenger rail stations: Bremerhaven Hauptbahnhof in the city centre, Bremerhaven-Lehe north of the centre and Bremerhaven-Wulsdorf in the southern part of the city. All three stations are served by hourly Bremen S-Bahn trains on the line RS 2 as well as regional services to Cuxhaven and Buxtehude on the line RB 33. Additionally, Bremerhaven Hauptbahnhof is served by regional express trains to Hanover (RE 8) and Osnabrück (RE 9) and was reconnected to Deutsche Bahn's Intercity network in late 2021, after nearly 20 years without long-distance rail services in the city.

A fourth station, Bremerhaven-Speckenbüttel near the border with Langen, has been out of service since 1988. Apart from passenger traffic, the railways in Bremerhaven carry a heavy load of freight traffic from and to the seaport, mostly new cars, containers and food.

=== Bus ===
In 2020, Bremerhaven had a bus network with 19 bus routes operated by BREMERHAVEN BUS. Two of the bus routes are night routes that only run on weekends. In addition, there is the Schnellbus-Line S, which serves selected stops and is therefore faster. BREMERHAVEN BUS operates up to 87 regular buses through the company Verkehrsgesellschaft Bremerhaven AG (VGB). There are numerous regional buses operated by other companies that depart from Bremerhaven Central Station, to Bad Bederkesa, Beverstedt, Hagen, Nordholz and Otterndorf. In addition, Bremerhaven is also served by buses from Flixbus.

=== Tram ===
Bremerhaven had a tram service from 1881 to 1982. In its heyday, in 1949, there were six lines. The last line was Line 2 from the north of the city to the main train station; but this was shut down on 30 July 1982.

=== Air ===
The city does not have its own civil airport. The nearest airport is Bremen Airport, which is located 58 km (36 mi) south east of Bremerhaven.

== Tourist attractions ==
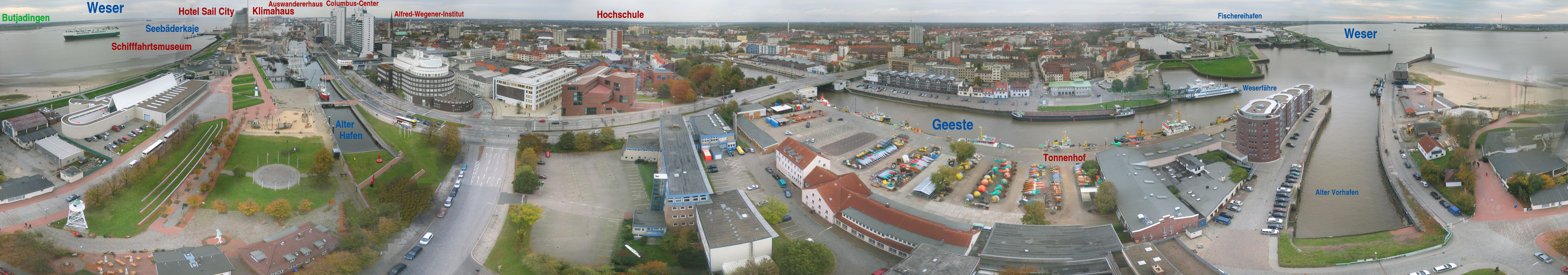
Panoramic view of Bremerhaven from Bremerhaven Radar Tower. On the left side the city including Columbus-Center are some tourist attractions and the de:Havenwelten just under construction.

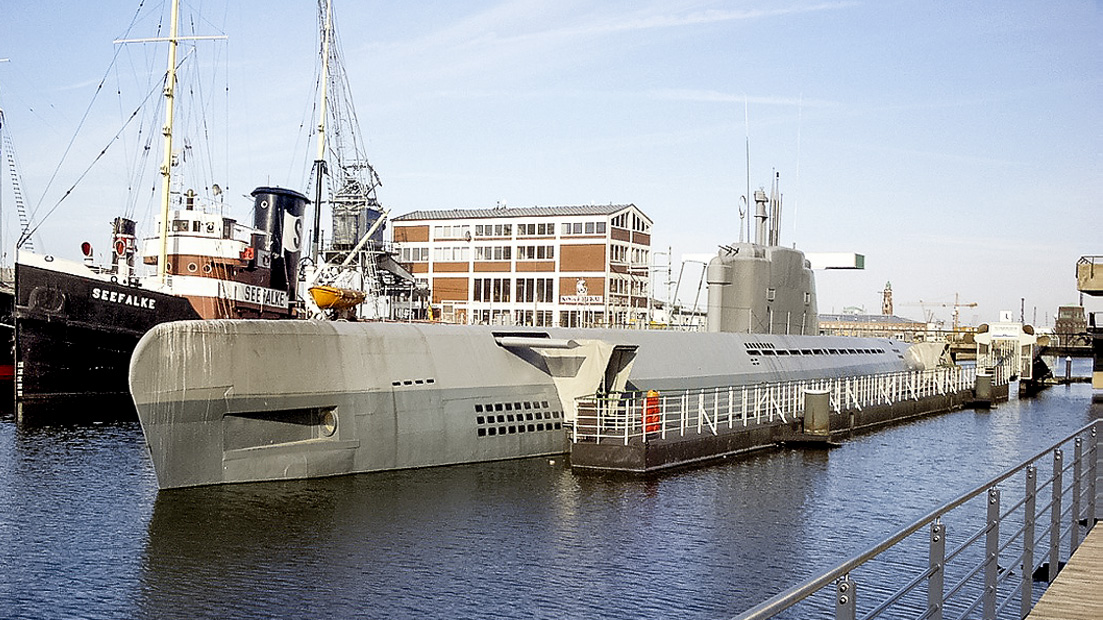
The Wilhelm Bauer at the German Maritime Museum

Bremerhaven has only a few historical buildings, and the high street and city centre are almost entirely post-war. The main attractions for tourists are found at the Havenwelten and include an attraction about climate change, the Klimahaus Bremerhaven 8° Ost, the German Emigration Center (since 8 August 2005) and the German Maritime Museum (Deutsches Schiffahrtsmuseum) by Hans Scharoun from 1975, featuring the Hansekogge, a vintage cog dating from 1380, excavated in Bremen in 1962, and the historical harbour (Museumshafen) with a number of museum ships, such as the Type XXI U-boat Wilhelm Bauer (a museum of its own), and the salvage tug Seefalke from 1924. The Bremerhaven Zoo reopened on 27 March 2004, after a lengthy renovation. It features Arctic wildlife, both terrestrial and marine. The latest addition is the Klimahaus from 2009, simulating travel adventure along the 8th line of longitude and dealing with climate issues. Two gazebos can be found on top of the Atlantic Hotel Sail City and the Radar Tower. Another tourist spot is the Fischereihafen (fishing port) in Geestemünde which also houses an aquarium (the Atlanticum). The Lloyd Werft shipyard is renowned for building and renovating large cruise liners, for example Norway.

Every five years Sail Bremerhaven is held, a large sailing convention that attracts tall ships from all over the world. The last time it was held was in 2015 with over 270 vessels and 3,500 crew members. In 2011 Bremerhaven set the record for the largest ever parade of boats, with 327 vessels in the parade. This record was broken in 2012 by the Thames Diamond Jubilee Pageant, with 1,000 boats.

The passenger terminal Columbuskaje, built at the Weser bank in 1927 to avoid time-absorbing locking, has been transferred into a cruise terminal (Columbus Cruise Center Bremerhaven/CCCB). Also three marinas are available, the latest accessible through a new lock at Neuer Hafen.

== Politics ==
Bremerhaven has a city council with 49 members. It also elects 15 members of the Bürgerschaft of Bremen.

== Population ==
Foreign residents
| Nationality | Population (31.12.2019) |
|---|---|
| Syria | 3,975 |
| Turkey | 3,110 |
| Bulgaria | 2,410 |
| Poland | 2,290 |
| Portugal | 1,485 |
| Romania | 1,240 |
| Russia | 765 |
| Serbia | 570 |
| Greece | 525 |
| Kosovo | 420 |

Historical population

| Year | Pop. | ±% |
|---|---|---|
| 1845 | 3,000 | — |
| 1875 | 12,296 | +309.9% |
| 1900 | 20,315 | +65.2% |
| 1925 | 23,896 | +17.6% |
| 1933 | 25,779 | +7.9% |
| 1950 | 114,070 | +342.5% |
| 1956 | 130,492 | +14.4% |

| Year | Pop. | ±% |
|---|---|---|
| 1961 | 141,849 | +8.7% |
| 1970 | 143,918 | +1.5% |
| 1980 | 138,728 | −3.6% |
| 1990 | 130,446 | −6.0% |
| 2001 | 118,701 | −9.0% |
| 2011 | 108,156 | −8.9% |
| 2022 | 118,133 | +9.2% |

Population size may be affected by changes in administrative divisions.

== Sport ==
The Fischtown Pinguins, also known as REV Bremerhaven, are a professional ice hockey team in the DEL, Germany's top ice hockey league.

Eisbären Bremerhaven (Polar Bears), founded 2001, is a basketball team playing in the German second-tier level league ProA.

The American Football team is the Bremerhaven Seahawks which play in the German Regio Nord of the 3rd League. The Seahawks are the second oldest team in Germany.

Local association football clubs are Leher TS, SFL Bremerhaven and until 2012 FC Bremerhaven. TSV Wulsdorf and OSC Bremerhaven also have a football teams but as part of a multi-sport club.

== Research and education ==
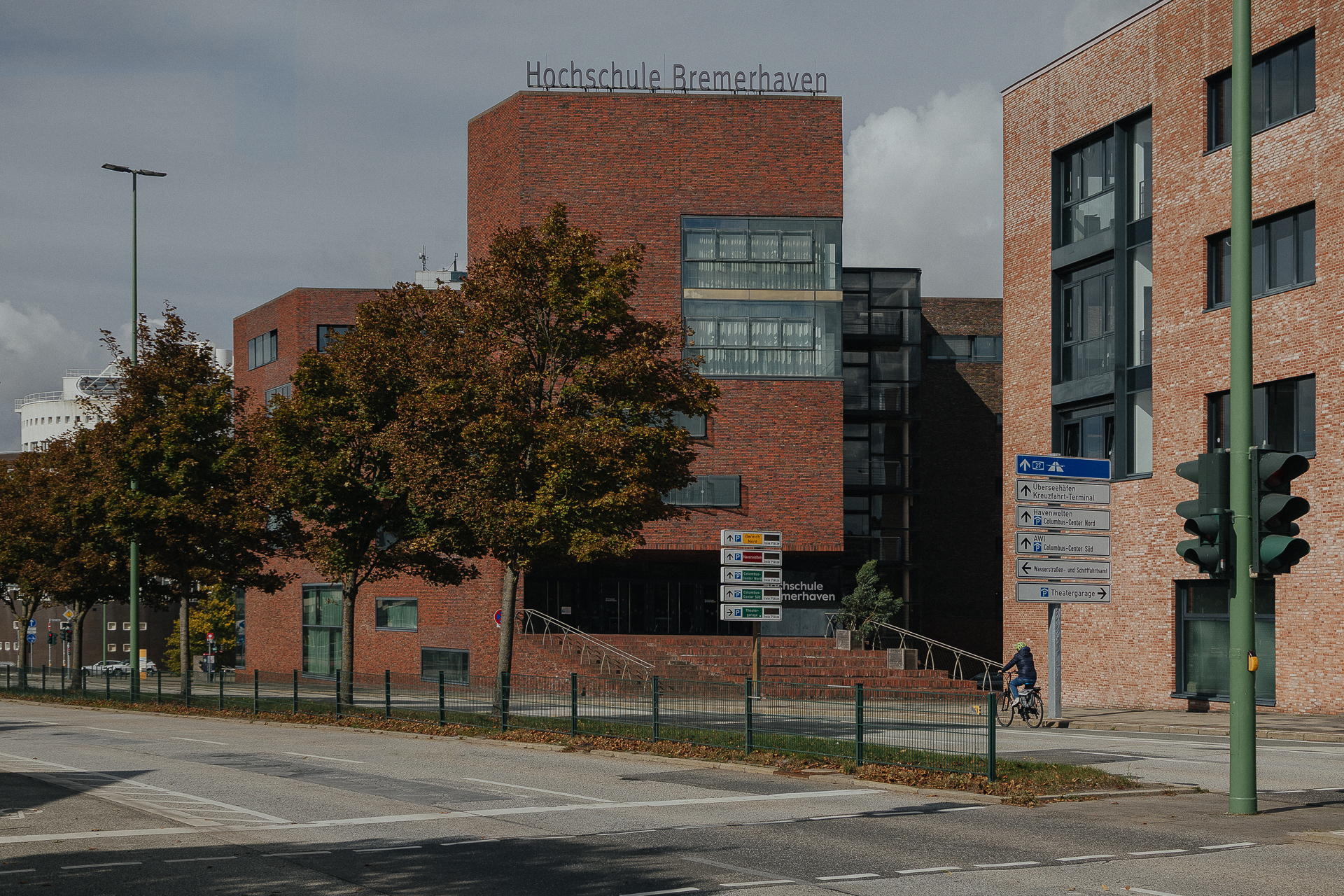
University of Applied Sciences

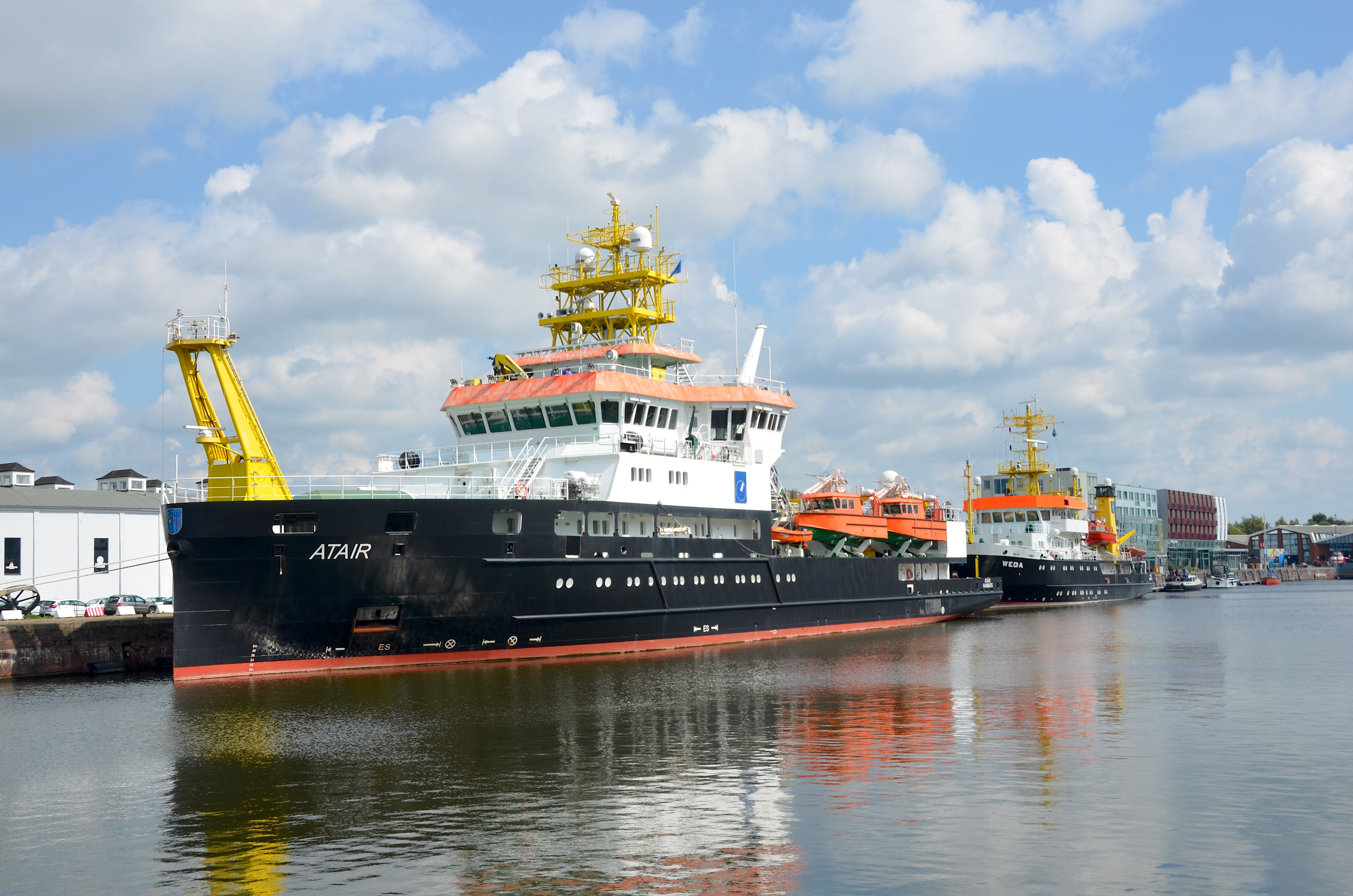
Research vessels Atair and Wega

Bremerhaven is home to the Alfred Wegener Institute, a national research institute which is concerned with maritime sciences and climate and keeps a number of research vessels, amongst them the heavy research icebreaker RV Polarstern. It also runs the Neumayer Station III in the Antarctic.

The Fraunhofer Society Institute for Wind Energy and Energy System Technology maintains research laboratories in Bremerhaven for development and testing of Wind Power components.

The German Maritime Museum is part of the German Leibniz Association.

The Bremerhaven University of Applied Sciences (German: Hochschule Bremerhaven) was founded in 1975 and is expanding since with more than 3.000 students in 2009. The university is attended by a large number of students from all over the world. Among the courses offered are Process Engineering, Information Technology and the BA Entrepreneurship, Innovation, Leadership programme, the first programme modelled after the Finnisch Team Academy format in a German language higher educational institution.

== Twin towns – sister cities ==
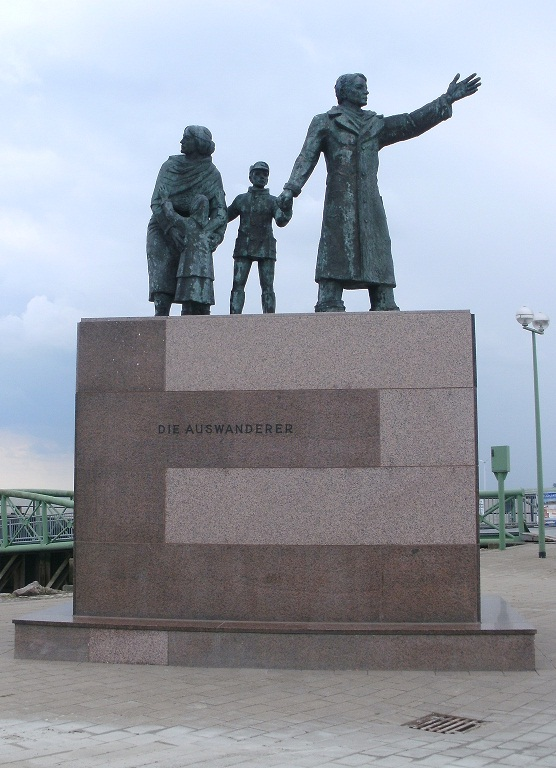
Memorial to emigrants from Germany in Bremerhaven harbour

Bremerhaven is twinned with:

- Cherbourg-en-Cotentin, France (1960)
- Grimsby, North East Lincolnshire, England, UK (1963)
- Pori, Finland (1969)
- Frederikshavn, Denmark (1979)
- Szczecin, Poland (1990)
- Kaliningrad, Russia (1992)

The three roads connecting the city of Bremerhaven to the Autobahn 27 consequently are named after the original three twin towns:

- Cherbourger Straße (AS Bremerhaven-Überseehafen)
- Grimsbystraße (AS Bremerhaven-Mitte)
- Poristraße (AS Bremerhaven-Geestemünde)

In addition to that, there are also streets which earlier had been named after Szczecin (Stettiner Straße) and Kaliningrad (Königsberger Straße).

== Notable people ==
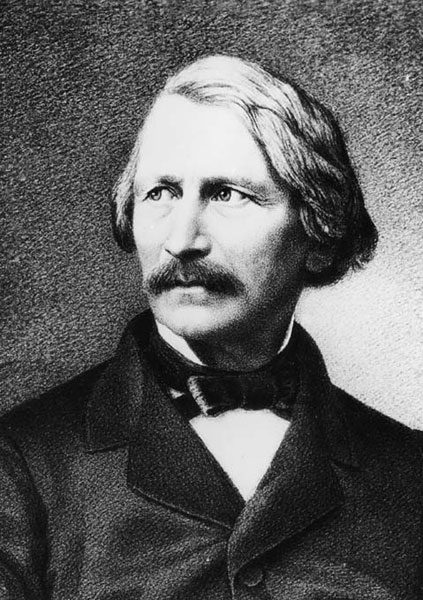
Gottfried Semper

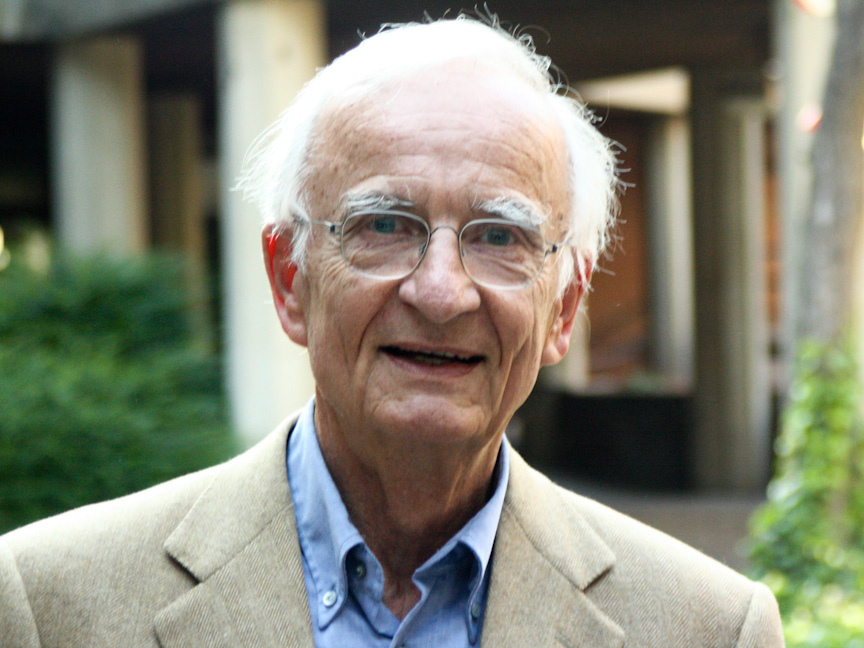
Norman Paech, 2010

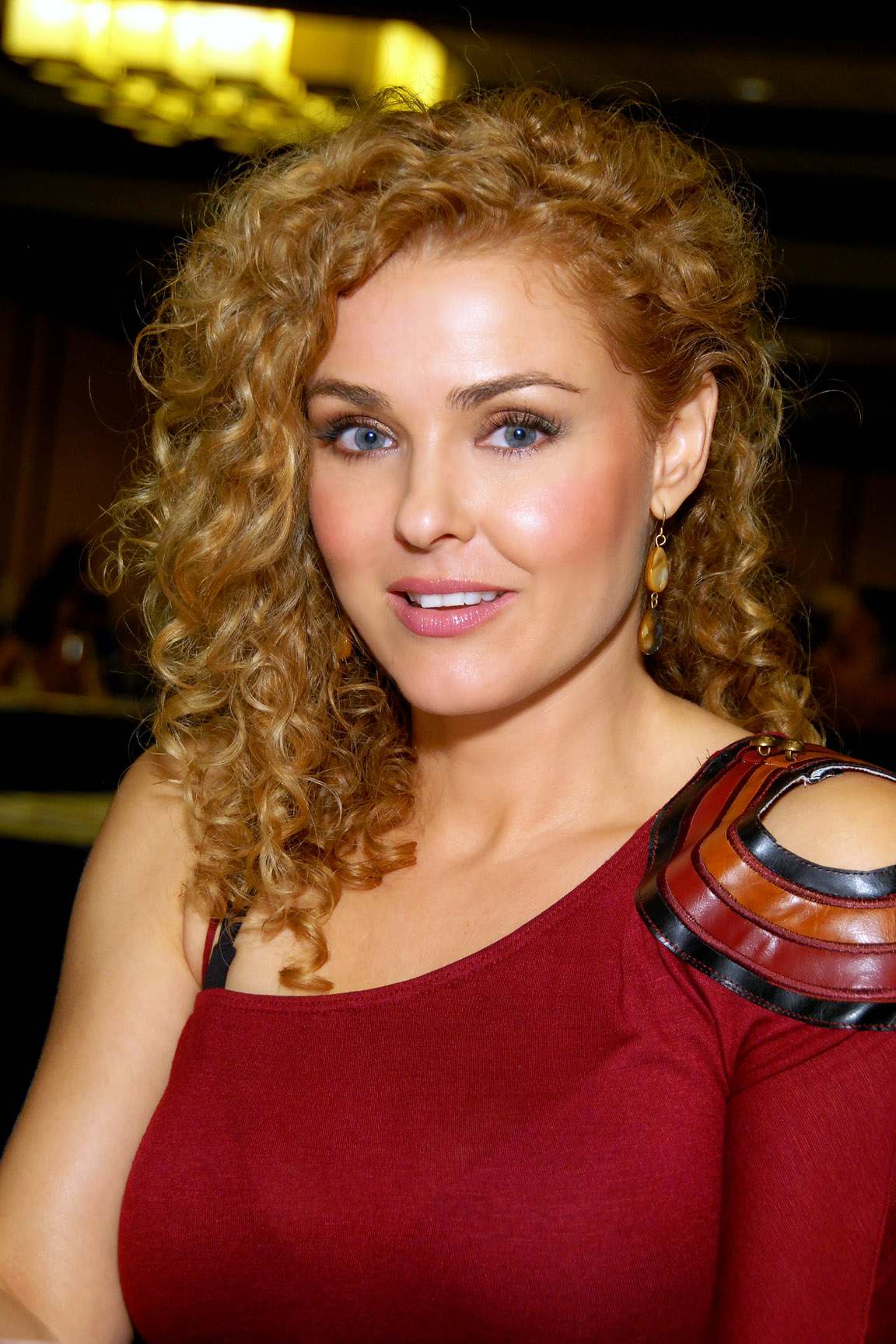
Corinna Harney, 2011

- Gottfried Semper (1803–1879), architect, volunteer at the port construction.
- Johanna Goldschmidt (1807–1884), social activist, writer and philanthropist
- Oda Olberg (1872-1955), journalist, socialist and feminist.
- Erich Koch-Weser (1875–1944), lawyer and politician
- Wolfgang Gaede (1878–1945), physicist and pioneer of vacuum engineering
- Helmut Yström (1881–1963), politician, Senator in Bremen, 1945–1948, local chief of police
- Hans Scharoun (1893–1972), grew up in Bremerhaven, architect and exponent of organic architecture
- Betty Schade (1895–1982), German-born American actress of the silent era
- Carl H. Hermann (1898–1961), professor of crystallography
- Adolf Butenandt (1903–1995), biochemist; awarded the Nobel Prize in Chemistry in 1939
- Lou Jacobs (1903–1992), American clown and entertainer
- Karl-Georg Saebisch (1903–1984), German-language theater, film and television actor, director and honorary member of the Municipal Theatre Bremerhaven
- Lale Andersen (1905–1972), singer and actress, sang WW2 song "Lili Marleen"
- Johannes Piersig (1907–1998), Kantor, docent for organ playing,
- Carola Höhn (1910–2005), stage and movie actress
- Werner Grübmeyer (1926–2018), local politician
- Eberhard Jäckel (1929–2017), historian, studied role of Adolf Hitler in German history
- Roger Asmussen (1936–2015), politician (CDU), German Minister of Economy and Transport in 1987
- Norman Paech (born 1938), university professor and politician (The Left)
- Sigrid Lorenzen Rupp (1943–2004), German-American architect
- Hans Joachim Alpers (1943–2011), writer and editor of science fiction and fantasy
- Hans Joachim Schliep (born 1945), Lutheran theologian, pastor and author
- Jeanne Córdova (1948–2016), American pioneer lesbian and gay rights activist
- Uwe Beckmeyer (born 1949), politician (SPD)
- Anton Zensus (born 1958), radio astronomer & director at the Max Planck Institute for Radio Astronomy
- Heino Ferch (born 1963), actor & voice actor
- Volker Engel (born 1965), visual effects supervisor and producer
- Christoph Maria Herbst (born 1966), actor and comedian at Stadttheater Bremerhaven 1992–1996
- Daniela Behrens (born 1968), politician (SPD)
- Corinna Harney (born 1972), German-American model and actress
- Anders Levermann (born 1973), environmental scientist and climatologist
- Jenny Dolfen (born 1975), illustrator and teacher
- Fynn Voigt (born 1999), politician (FDP)

=== Sport ===
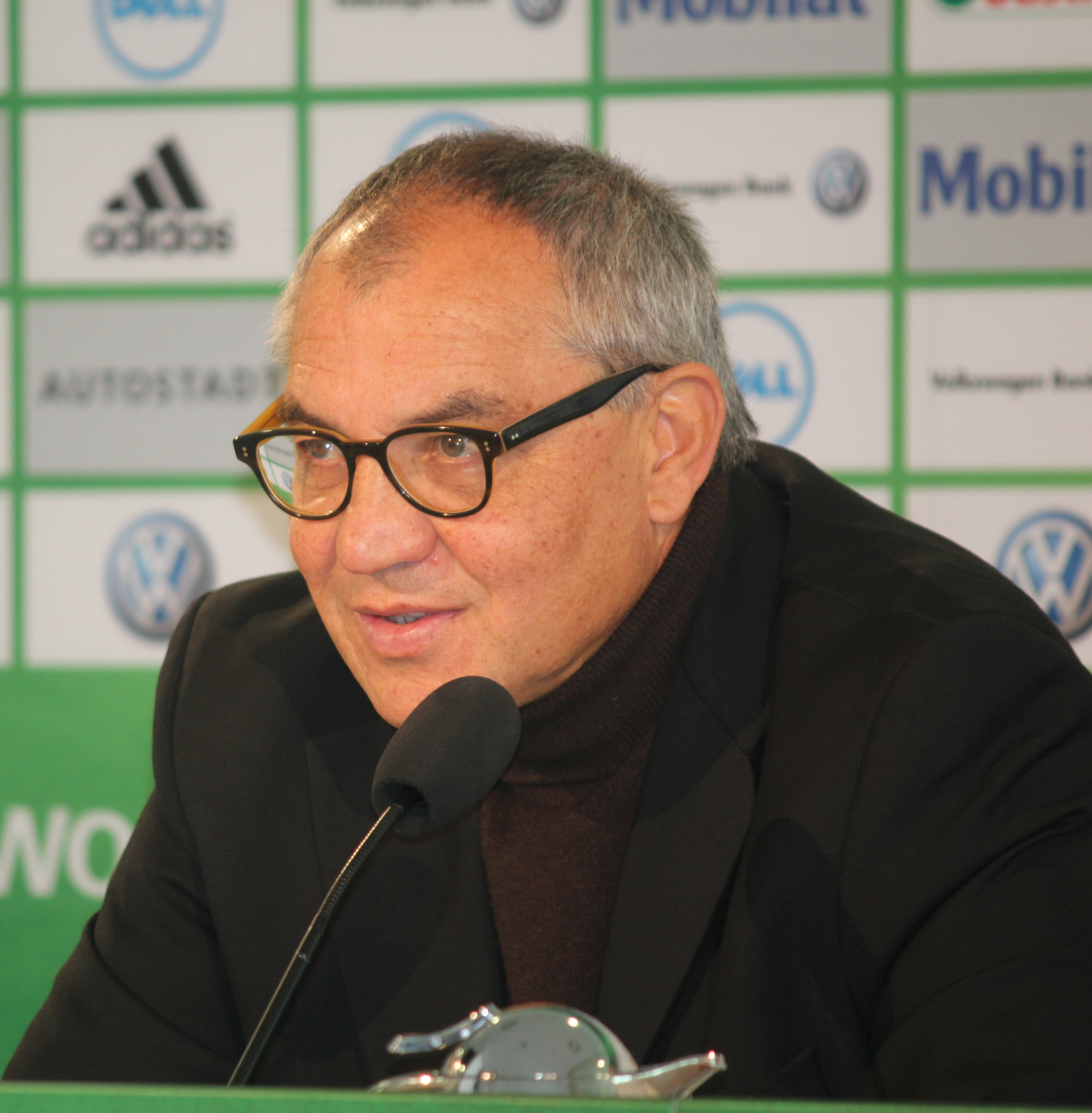
Felix Magath, 2011

- Walter Schmidt (1937–2024), footballer, played 299 games
- Egon Coordes (1944–2025), football player and coach, played 157 games
- Willi Reimann (born 1949), footballer and football coach, played 304 games
- Felix Magath (born 1953), football player and coach, played 382 games and 43 for Germany
- Bernd Brexendorf (born 1954), footballer and doctor, played 154 games
- Tomas Seyler (born 1974), darts player
- Lars Toborg (born 1975), football player, played over 280 games
- Clemens Schoppenhauer (born 1992), footballer, played 216 games
- Esra Sibel Tezkan (born 1993), Turkish-German footballer
