= Helmut Yström =

German politician

Helmut Yström (1881–1963) was a German politician and Senator in Bremen, Germany.

== Biography ==
Yström's first foray into government work was his military service during World War I. From 1919 to 1937, he was a Bremen police officer. He quickly rose in the hierarchy of the police force, and in 1945 became the police president of Bremerhaven. He served in this capacity until 1948, the year in which he retired.

After the Second World War, he joined the CDU. As successor to Martin Wilkens, he was the Bremen senator for Food and Agriculture Department in the SPD / CDU Senate of Bremen under the leadership of William Kaisen from 1952 to 1955. This department was disbanded in 1955. Yström was then a successor to John Degener, a CDU Senator for the housing sector. This department was also disbanded in 1955.
