= Johannes Piersig =

German Kantor and docent

Johannes Piersig (24 November 1907 – 26 April 1998) was a German Kantor, docent for organ playing, music education and music theory, and later in 1979/80 rector of the Free University of Hamburg.

== Life ==
Born in Geestemünde, Piersig studied singing and organ playing at the Hochschule für Musik und Theater "Felix Mendelssohn Bartholdy" Leipzig. After several concert tours, he took up the position of cantor at St Elizabeth's Church, Wrocław in 1932. In 1941, he became Kirchenmusikdirektor at the university there and at the same time taught as a lecturer at the Hochschulinstitut für Musikerziehung.

As a result of the end of the war, Piersig had to flee towards the West in May 1945. He returned to his city of study and became Kantor of the St. Nicholas Church, Leipzig, a post in which he remained until 1959.

Just one year after the end of the war, he also received a position as lecturer for organ playing at the Hochschule für Musik und Theater "Felix Mendelssohn Bartholdy" Leipzig. There he also taught his later successor Wolfgang Hofmann as church music director at St. Nikolai.

On 1 April 1947, he was appointed church music director and Lektor for music theory at the Martin Luther University in Halle, where he simultaneously took over the direction of the Robert-Franz-Singakademie as successor to the Royal Music Director Alfred Rahlwes. From 1956, he additionally taught at the Humboldt-Universität zu Berlin.

In the same year, Piersig received his doctorate at the Martin Luther University of Halle-Wittenberg with his dissertation Das Weltbild des Heinrich Schütz. Promoted by the members of the Spirituskreis, he received a professorship with a teaching assignment for musicology in 1948.

After the attacks on the Spirituskreis by the Socialist Unity Party of Germany regime of the GDR, Piersig fled a second time, this time to the Federal Republic, and a year later began working as a church musician in Blankenese. In 1978, he obtained a position as a lecturer at the Free University of Hamburg (renamed the "Free University of Northern Germany" after its move to Seevetal) and was rector of this Christian-oriented, non-governmental university in 1979 and 1980.

Piersig died in Wedel, Schleswig-Holstein at the age of 90.

== Significance ==
Piersig's musicological research was mainly concerned with Baroque church music (among others Europäische Orgelmusik , 1958). In addition, he worked on various research commissions on music history.

== Honours ==
- Orlando di Lasso-Medaille
- Order of Merit of the Federal Republic of Germany with ribbon (1981)

== Work ==
- Das Weltbild des Heinrich Schütz (Dissertation, 1947)
- Europäische Orgelmusik (1958)
- Beiträge zu einer Rechtssoziologie der Kirchenmusik. (1972)
- Das Fortschrittsproblem in der Musik um die Jahrhundertwende (1977)
- So ging es allenfalls (Lebenserinnerungen aus dem Nachlass, 2003)
