= Fynn Voigt =

German politician (born 1999)

Member of the Bürgerschaft of Bremen
- Incumbent
- Assumed office 29 June 2023

Personal details
- Born: 6 April 1999 (age 27) Bremerhaven
- Party: Free Democratic Party

Fynn Voigt (born 6 April 1999 in Bremerhaven) is a German politician serving as a member of the Bürgerschaft of Bremen since 2023. From 2021 to 2023, he served as chairman of the Young Liberals in Bremen.
