= Anders Levermann =

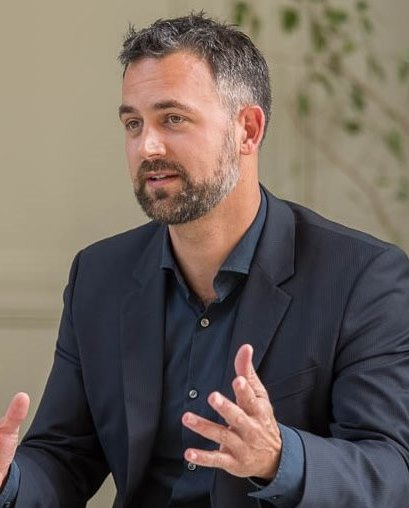
- Levermann in Potsdam, Germany, in 2016
- Born: 1973 (age 52–53); Bremerhaven, West Germany
- Citizenship: German
- Education: Physicist
- Alma mater: Weizmann Institute of Science, Rehovot, Israel
- Occupation: Climate scientist
- Organization(s): Potsdam Institute for Climate Impact Research, Germany
- Title: Ph.D.

Anders Levermann is a climate scientist at the Potsdam Institute for Climate Impact Research and Columbia University. He is a Professor of the Dynamics of the Climate System at Institute for Physics and Astrophysics of the Potsdam University, Germany. He has been involved in the assessment report of the Intergovernmental Panel on Climate Change since 2004 (contributing author to the paleoclimate chapter of the fourth assessment report, lead author of sea-level change chapter of the fifth report, lead author of the ocean, cryosphere and sea level chapter of the current Sixth Assessment Report). Levermann advises political and economic stakeholders on the issue of climate change.

== Life ==
Born in 1973 in Bremerhaven, Germany, Anders Levermann studied physics at the universities of Marburg and Kiel in Germany. He received his diploma in 1999. During his PhD in theoretical physics at the Weizmann Institute of Science, Israel he worked advised by Itamar Procaccia on fractal growth patterns within the general field of statistical physics.

Levermann received his PhD in theoretical physics in 2003, after which he started to work on climate dynamics at the Potsdam Institute for Climate Impact Research. Initially as a Postdoc with a scholarship of Gary-Comer-foundation, he became junior professor in 2006. Since October 2007, he has been a senior researcher at the Potsdam Institute for Climate Impact Research and a Professor of the Dynamics of the Climate System at Physics Institute of Potsdam University, Germany. His research focuses on tipping elements of the climate system and economic consequences of climate change.

Since 2012 he has been leading the research domain on sustainable solutions of the climate problem at Potsdam Institute for Climate Impact Research, working together with PIK's chief-economist Prof. Ottmar Edenhofer. In some newspaper articles, e.g. in the Frankfurter Allgemeine Zeitung and The Guardian, he hypothesized that there is a limit to the adaptive capacity of our current society. In a commentary in the scientific journal Nature, he therefore called for a publicly available information system to induce a "global adaptation" of our supply chains (www.zeean.net).

In August 2020, Levermann pointed out the urgency of the climate crisis and the need to transition to a completely emission-free economic system. Herein he said: “When I started climate research we were at 0.6 degrees Celsius of global warming, now it's between 1.1 and 1.2 degrees. It really is a bit depressing that we have achieved so little even in the rich countries.” In a guest article in the Frankfurter Allgmeine Zeitung in July 2021 "The folding of the world", Levermann emphasized that sustainability must “be progress, not regression, if it is to serve people”. He suggested a new narrative for society in line with the folding principle in chaos theory which allows infinite growth in finite space. As a conceptual model, he referred to the mathematical principle of folding as a "growth into diversity" caused by limits instead of an expansion into infinity. The finiteness of resources and as well as space on land, in the ocean and in the atmosphere is to be seen as a basic principle: growth into diversity can be achieved by “generating a scarcity that leads to innovation if you allow it to evolve without further restrictions” – “in the language of economics: scarcity generates innovation". As an example, he named a decoupling of growth and emissions within the scope of the European emissions trading scheme. As a further example, he cited the fact that one could regulate the size of companies via fiscal incentive to regain the primacy of politics over the economy. In this idea it is central that the limits become part of the economic dynamics. Taxes as opposed to anti-trust agencies, would serve this goal and allow for the market and company strategies to decide which company size is optimal
