= Landsberg am Lech =

- Town
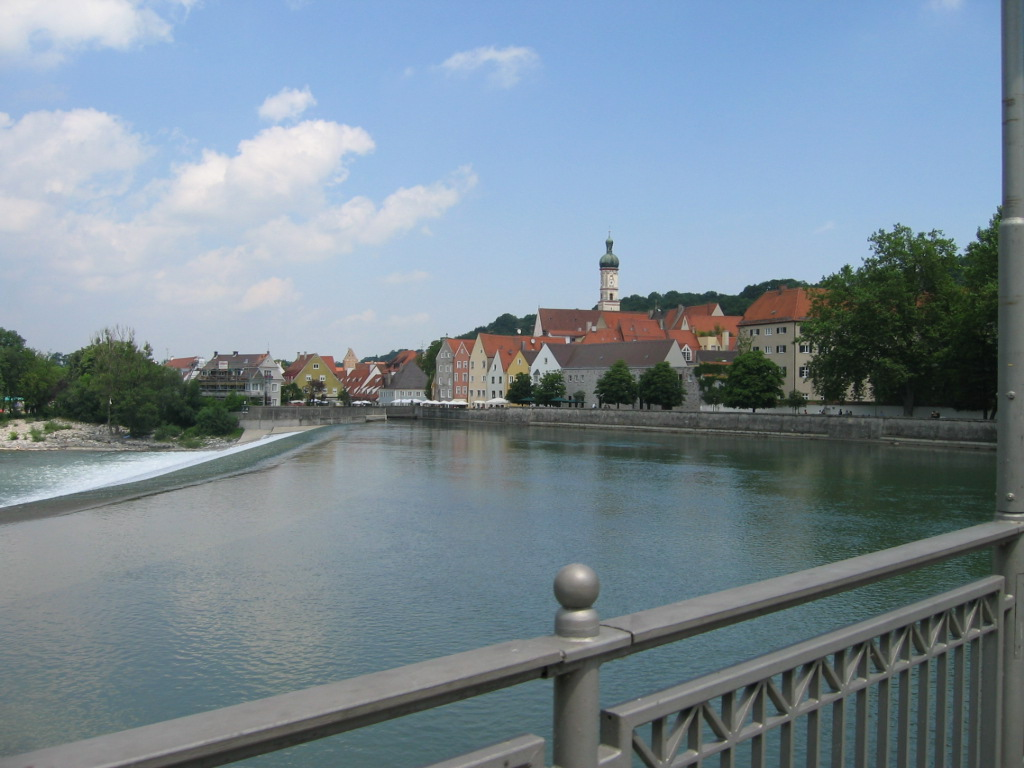
- The Lech in Landsberg

- Coat of arms

- Location of Landsberg am Lech within Landsberg am Lech district
- Interactive map of Landsberg am Lech
- Location within Germany Location within Bavaria
- Coordinates: 48°02′52″N 10°53′56″E
- Country: Germany
- State: Bavaria
- Admin. region: Oberbayern
- District: Landsberg am Lech
- Subdivisions: 6 Ortsteile

Government
  - Mayor (2020–26): Doris Baumgartl

Area
  - Total: 57.91 km^{2} (22.36 sq mi)
- Elevation: 585–630 m (1,919–2,067 ft)

Population (2025-12-31)
  - Total: 29,230
  - Density: 504.7/km^{2} (1,307/sq mi)
- Time zone: UTC+01:00 (CET)
  - Summer (DST): UTC+02:00 (CEST)
- Postal codes: 86899
- Dialling codes: 08191, 08246 (Ellighofen)
- Vehicle registration: LL
- Website: www.landsberg.de

Landsberg am Lech (German pronunciation: [ˈlantsbɛʁk ʔam ˈlɛç], lit. 'Landsberg on the Lech') is a town in southwest Bavaria, Germany, about 65 kilometers (40 mi) west of Munich and 35 kilometers (22 mi) south of Augsburg. It is the capital of the district of Landsberg am Lech.

== History ==
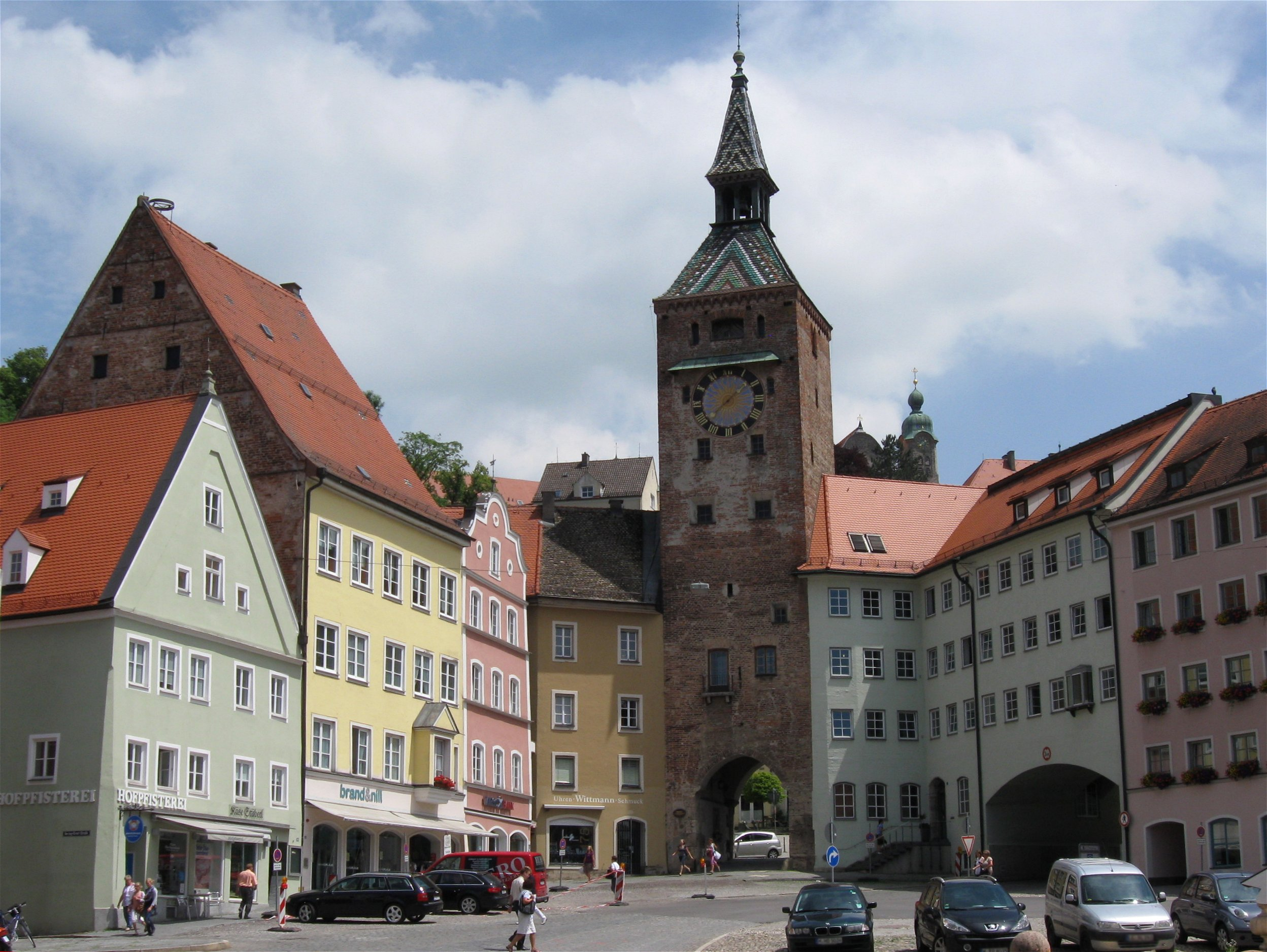
The historic old town

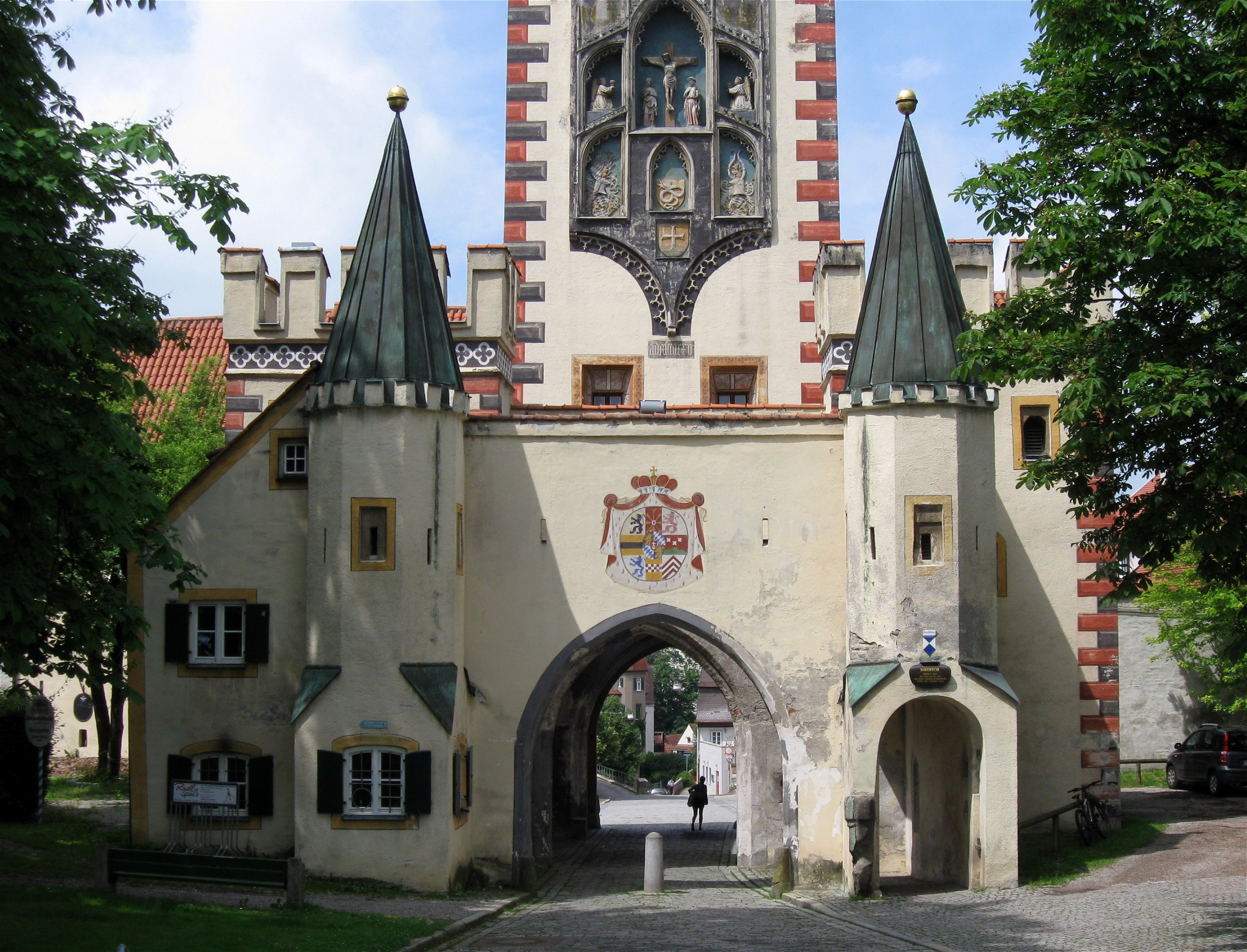
Bayertor, the gate to Munich

=== Salt road ===
Landsberg is situated on the Romantic Road and is the center of the Lechrain region, the boundary region between Swabia and Bavaria. Landsberg am Lech developed where a major historic salt road crossed over the Lech. To protect the bridge, Duke Henry the Lion ordered a castle to be built, Castrum Landespurch, incorporating an older settlement and castle named Phetine. Soon a greater settlement evolved, which received its town charter as early as the 13th century. In 1315, the town burned down, but was rebuilt. As of 1320 Landsberg am Lech was permitted to collect salt duties, bringing considerable wealth to the town. In 1419, a river tax added a further source of income.

In 1437 Hans Multscher crafted the Landsberg Virgin and Child as the main figures of an altar. Multscher's Wurzach Altar design for the Landsberg church has been noted for a new realism and realistic detail.

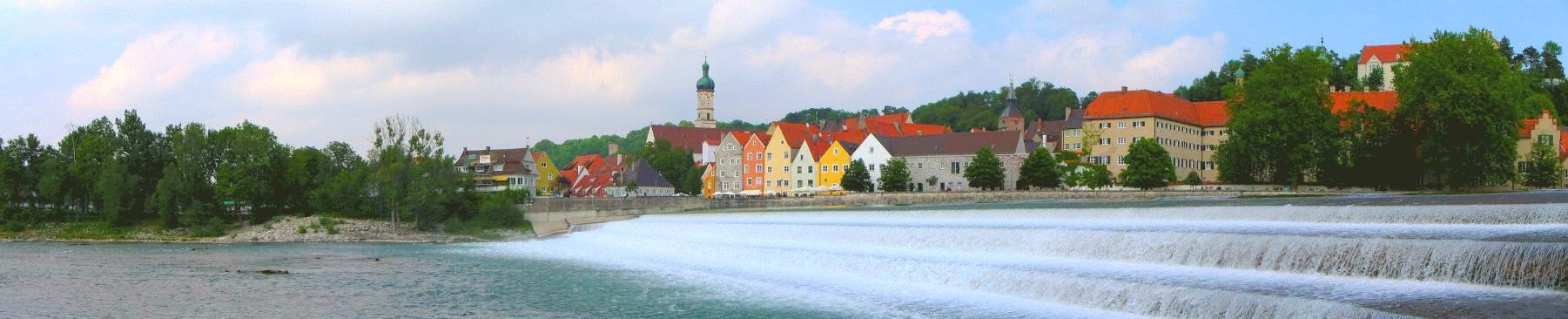
Lech weir and the historic centre of Landsberg am Lech

=== Nazi Germany ===
The town is noted for its prison where Adolf Hitler was incarcerated in 1924. During this incarceration Hitler wrote/dictated his book Mein Kampf together with Rudolf Hess. His cell, number 7, became part of the Nazi cult and many followers came to visit it during the German Nazi-period. Landsberg am Lech was also known as the town of the Hitler Youth.

In the outskirts of this town existed a concentration camp complex, Kaufering, where over 30,000 victims were imprisoned under inhuman conditions, resulting in the death of around 14,500 of them.

After World War II it was the location for one of the largest displaced person (DP) camps for Jewish refugees and the place of execution for more than 150 war criminals after 1945.

== Geography ==
=== Town areas ===
The town comprises three main areas. The historic old town centre of Landsberg, which lies between the river Lech and its easterly elevated bank. The area to the west of the Lech (Katharinenvorstadt, Neuerpfting, Weststadt, Schwaighofsiedlung – today by far the biggest part of the town) and the area on the easterly elevated bank (Bayervorstadt) developed since the early 19th century.

Also belonging to Landsberg are the hamlets of Sandau and Pössing as well as the former independent boroughs of Ellighofen, Erpfting (with Friedheim, Geratshof and Mittelstetten), Pitzling (with Pöring) and Reisch (with Thalhofen).

== Landsberg concentration camp and displaced person camp ==
The Landsberg camp began in June 1944 as a Nazi concentration camp. By October 1944, there were more than 5,000 prisoners alive in the camp. Most of the remaining inmates who were able to walk were "evacuated" by the Germans in death marches in April 1945.

The camp was liberated on 27 April 1945 by the 12th Armored Division of the United States Army. Upon orders from General Taylor, the American forces allowed news media to record the atrocities, and ordered local German civilians and guards to reflect upon the dead and bury them bare-handed. A dramatization of the discovery and liberation of the camp was presented in Episode 9: "Why We Fight" of the Band of Brothers mini-series.

After the liberation, it became a displaced person (DP) camp, primarily for Jewish refugees from the Soviet Union and the Baltic states. The DP camp closed on 15 October 1950.

In December 2019, Israeli academic and translator Ilana Hammerman wrote of the difficulties she encountered in trying to visit the site of the concentration camp and to find the memorial to the victims. She noted that "[f]or decades after the war, local residents and the authorities endeavored to ignore its existence and consign it to oblivion". Since 1983 Anton Posset and the association called Landsberg im 20. Jahrhundert are working on commemorating this part of history and established based on donations the European Holocaust Memorial on the former concentration camp Kaufering VII.

== Transport ==
The municipality has two railway stations, Landsberg (Lech) and Landsberg (Lech) Schule.

== Notable people ==
- Samuel Bak (born 1933), painter and writer
- Johnny Cash (1932–2003), American singer/songwriter stationed in the Landsberg-Lech Airbase from 1951 until his discharge in 1954 while serving in the U.S. Air Force
- Sir Hubert von Herkomer (1849–1914), artist, film and theatre director
- Adolf Hitler (1889–1945), dictator (was in prison in Landsberg 1923/24)
- Heinz Hoenig (born 1951), actor
- Ignaz Kögler (1680–1746), Jesuit missionary and mathematician
- Morris Kleiner (born 1948), AFL-CIO Professor of Labor Policy, University of Minnesota
- Lanspergius (1489–1539), Carthusian monk and ascetical writer
- Julian Nagelsmann (born 1987), football manager
- Erwin Neher (born 1944), Nobel laureate, studied at the Technical University of Munich (TUM)
- Florian Neuhaus (born 1997), footballer
- Anton Posset (1941–2015), holocaust researcher and founder of the European Holocaust Memorial located in Landsberg
- Siegfried Rauch (1932–2018), actor
- George Remus (1878–1952), attorney and famed bootlegger during U.S. Prohibition
- Luise Rinser (1911–2002), writer and politician
- Wilhelm Ritter von Leeb (1876–1956), World War II field marshal and war criminal
- Michael Unterbuchner (born 1988), darts player
- Alois Wolfmüller (1864–1948), inventor and aeronautical engineer
- Dominikus Zimmermann (1685–1766), architect

== Twin towns – sister cities ==
Landsberg am Lech is twinned with:

- Hudson, United States (1984)
- Saint-Laurent-du-Var, France (1986)
- Bushey, England, United Kingdom (1989)
- Rocca di Papa, Italy (1989)
- Waldheim, Germany (1990)
- Siófok, Hungary (2002)

== Sports ==
Landsberg is home to the following sports clubs:

Club	Sport	League	Established
TSV Landsberg	Football	Landesliga Bayern	1882
Landsberg Riverkings	Ice hockey	Regionalliga (Bayernliga)	2008
Landsberg X-PRESS	American football	Regionalliga Süd	2007
DJK Landsberg	Basketball	Regionalliga	1956
Jahn Landsberg	Football	A-Klasse Oberbayern	1923
Türkspor Landsberg	Football	A-Klasse Oberbayern	--
Landsberg Cruisaders	Baseball	Bezirksliga Bayern	2003
Landsberg Kodiacs	Softball	Landesliga Bayern	2009
Landsberg BB-Dance Camp	Dance	Boogie Woogie Dance Festival	1987

== Sources ==
- Burgett, Daniel R. (2001). Beyond the Rhine. New York: Dell Publishing. pp. 119–134.
- Thomas Raithel, Die Strafanstalt Landsberg am Lech und der Spöttinger Friedhof (1944-1958). Eine Dokumentation im Auftrag des Instituts für Zeitgeschichte München-Berlin (München: Oldenbourg 2009).
