= European Holocaust Memorial in Landsberg =

Memorial site in Germany

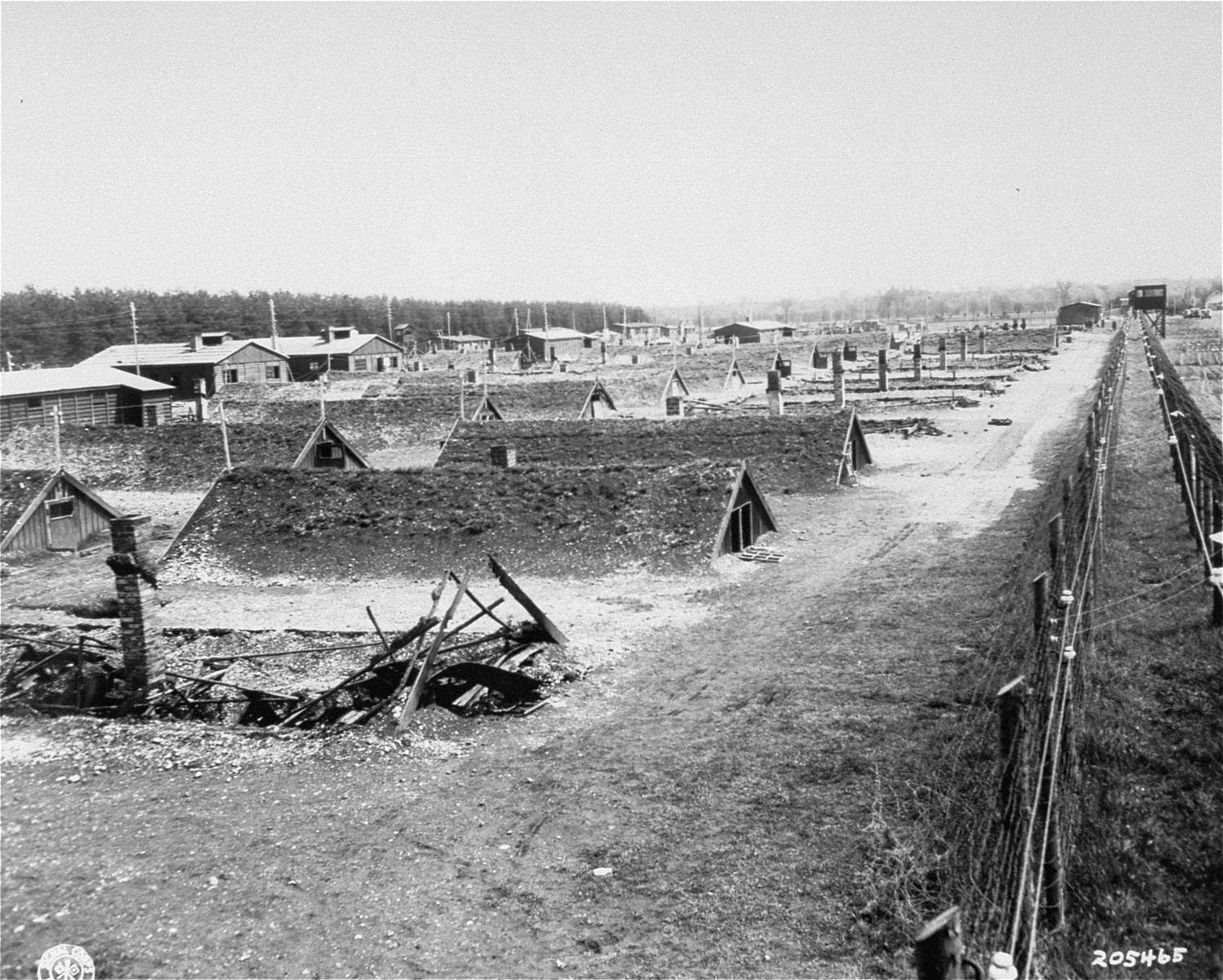
Earth barracks Kaufering IV (Hurlach). Photograph taken on 28 April 1945 after the liberation by the US Army.

The European Holocaust Memorial in Landsberg am Lech is on the site of former subcamp number seven Erpfting (Landsberg), one of eleven former subcamps of Kaufering concentration camp complex, the largest remote area of the concentration camp Dachau. It contains the last remains, including six ruins of clay tube barracks and the last traces of concentration camp earth huts. In administrative terms it belonged to the remote concentration camp of Dachau near Munich. The camp commander for the Landsberg/Kaufering concentration camp complex (11 concentration camps) was deployed directly in Berlin. At the suggestion of Franz Josef Strauss, Anton Posset and the "Bürgervereinigung Landsberg im 20. Jahrhundert" were able to convince the Jewish survivor of The Holocaust Alexander Moksel to make the financial means available for the acquisition of part of the former concentration camp site of the Kaufering VII concentration camp command and subsequently return it to a dignified condition. The other, overgrown and neglected part of the site is owned by the city of Landsberg. It was levelled and backfilled. In 2009, the memorial was transferred by the Citizens' Association of Landsberg in the 20th century to the European Holocaust Memorial Foundation, which has successfully carried out the professional conservation of the buildings and monuments on and at the former Kaufering VII concentration camp since then.

Even more than 75 years after world war II, in 2021 it's only possible to visit the European Holocaust Memorial after pre-registration and with accompaniment.

As part of the Ringeltaube armament project, three gigantic semi-underground bunkers were to be built in the Frauenwald in Landsberg for the aircraft production of the fighter jet Messerschmitt Me 262. From 18 June 1944, Lithuanian and Hungarian Jews were used for the construction. As more and more prisoners - including those from disbanded camps - were transferred, many other nationalities were later represented. By the end of April 1945, a total of about 30,000 prisoners had passed through the camps, including 4200 women and 850 children. In just ten months, according to estimates from early post-war times, at least 14,500 prisoners died from hunger, epidemics, executions, transfer to Auschwitz-Birkenau, and on a death March.

== Remote camps of the Dachau concentration camp under the name Kommando Kaufering ==
Kaufering was the name-giving train station of the Lechfeldbahn from Munich.

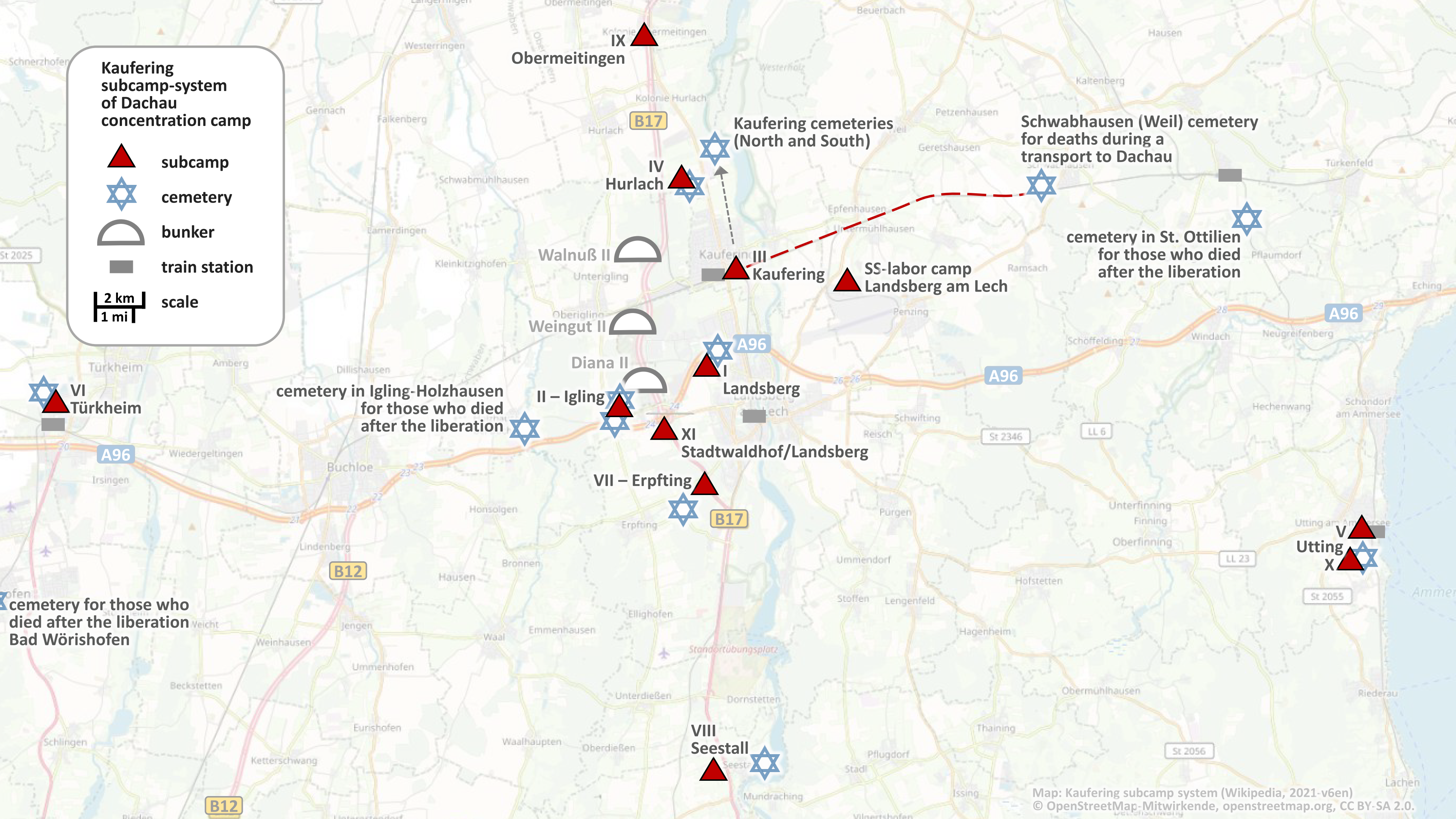
map of all subcamps of Kaufering concentration camp complex (all gps-locations)

== Part of the war important aircraft production ==
The use of the prisoners in the Ringeltaube armament project for the aircraft production of the Me 262 fighter jet was planned after the destruction of Augsburg and its aircraft plants by allied bomber units. About 40 km away, the construction of semi-subterranean, bomb-proof large bunkers was started. This was not only the temporary solution in Augsburg, but after the heavy losses by allied bombing raids at numerous places in the Reich, Hitler had ordered the underground relocation of the entire armaments industry in 1944. The newly developed type of the jet-driven Messerschmitt-Jäger Me 262 was to be assembled around Landsberg. Three identical buildings were planned, of which only the bunker code-named Weingut II in Igling was built. The vault was designed as a bomb-proof protective dome for the actual assembly halls and had a length of 240 m, a width of 83m and a height of 30 meters. Its dome consisted of three meter thick reinforced concrete. Below it was a five-storey reinforced concrete building for the factory. During construction, a fill of 210,000 cubic meters of gravel was used instead of the usual wooden and metal formwork. After pouring the concrete slab, this gravel was removed by hand and tipping lorries (48° 4′ 11.8″ N, 10° 49′ 34.8″ E).

The prisoners were used without consideration for life and limbs. The allocation of food was inadequate. According to the report of the war crimes investigation commission under Captain Barnet and the trial documents from the big roof trial, the 11 concentration camps of Landsberg/Kaufering were the worst in Bavaria in terms of inhumane housing, food and the high death rate. The prisoners called these camps "cold crematorias".

- Map with aerial photos and coordinates of the bunker construction sites and factories for precast concrete parts for the interior finishing of the bunkers of the Kaufering camp complexes.

== The controversial number of victims ==
How many of the Jewish concentration camp prisoners around Landsberg and Kaufering were murdered is not known in the sense of records and what was actually documented there. There are two controversial figures. In April 1949, the Advocate General of the Bavarian State Office for Restitution, Auerbach, tried to determine the number of Jewish concentration camp prisoners murdered in the Kaufering and Landsberg concentration camp commandos. In the Landsberg Official Gazette and in the Landsberger Nachrichten, citizens of the town and district of Landsberg and former concentration camp inmates were called upon to provide information "concerning the concentration camp inmates who died in the Landsberg district". Auerbach then prepared a report entitled "Compilation of Camp Strengths and Death Rates of the Camps around Landsberg," which went to the city of Landsberg on 23 April 1949. Accordingly, 44,457 concentration camp prisoners were murdered in the eleven concentration camps of Landsberg and Kaufering in ten months. Among them were "4000 dead who had been shot, killed, and died of weakness on the death march in the city and district". These figures allegedly created a wave of indignation and horror in Landsberg. A commission with the then Lord Mayor Ludwig Thoma, the District Administrator Otto Gerbl, the representative of the Jewish committee Abraham Pelmann, the representative of the Bavarian relief organization Curt Klemann, and the editor and former NSDAP member Paul Winkelmayer counterestimated the figures. They agreed on the above number of 14,500 dead. According to this "official estimate", which is still valid today and has also been included in the standard work "Der Ort des Terrors", not a single concentration camp prisoner would, for example, have died during the evacuation of the remote camps and on the death marches.

== Today's facility ==
Each one of the memorial stones donated by European heads of state to the deported and murdered Jews from their countries describes in its own way the significance of the memory of the loss of the Jewish part of the respective nation. At their central location - the former Appellplatz - twelve granite steles stand opposite those representing the eleven concentration camps of the Kaufering concentration camp commandos and the Landsberg concentration camp at Penzing Air Base. They symbolize simultaneously the twelve tribes of Israel. To the east of this ensemble, a memorial stone of the American and French liberators reminds of "Never again". In the West, the civic association erected a stone in memory of the Jewish victims, since neither Federal President Herzog nor his successor Rau were prepared to donate a German memorial stone.

The central memorial site is completed by three small stones dedicated to victims of the Kaufering concentration camp who are known by name. These elements are not only related to each other, but also in the historical context of the architectural remains of the clay tube barracks, the foundations of functional barracks uncovered in the ground, and the underground formations of the former concentration camp earthworks.

At the entrance to the former concentration camp, an information panel shows the historical context of the camp throughout the Kaufering concentration camp command. A historical tipping lorry stands for the dehumanizing forced labor that the Jewish prisoners had to perform as slaves.

On the basis of a feasibility study carried out in 2010, the European Holocaust Memorial Foundation, in collaboration with the Bavarian State Office for Monument Preservation, began in 2014 to conserve the architectural monuments existing on the former Kaufering VII concentration camp, in particular the three clay tube barracks that are still fully preserved The architectural monuments on the former Kaufering VII concentration camp have meanwhile been evaluated as buildings of national importance They "contribute to shaping the cultural heritage of the Federal Republic of Germany". The "cultural heritage of the Federal Republic of Germany" has been shaped by the architectural monuments of the former Kaufering VII concentration camp.

The conservation of the three intact barracks was funded by the Bavarian State Ministry for Education and Culture, Science and the Arts, the Federal Government Commissioner for Culture and the Media, the German Federal Parliament Special Programme IV, the Bavarian State Office for Monument Protection (BLfD), the German Foundation for Monument Conservation (Deutsche Stiftung Denkmalschutz) with help from the GlückSpirale Lottery, the Bavarian State Foundation, the District of Upper Bavaria and the European Holocaust Memorial Foundation.

During conservation work in Camp VII of the former Landsberg-Kaufering subcamp complex, signatures of Jewish prisoners were discovered in March 2015.

At the end of the conservation work on the former Kaufering VII concentration camp, the Bayerische Ingenieurskammer-Bau together with the Bavarian State Office for Monument Preservation honored the European Holocaust Memorial Foundations commitment with the Bavarian Monument Preservation Award 2016 in gold. The juries reasoning: "The prize-worthiness of this monument lies in particular in the efforts to give a future to an important document of a concentration camps remote camp as unchanged as possible. The solution found, to secure the partially damaged clay tubes only from the outside, is to be emphasized. The courageous approach of only conserving the clay tubes and the coordination of all measures between the planners and the restorer represent an outstanding achievement".

As a necessary complement to the European Holocaust Memorial with the historical monuments of the former Kaufering VII concentration camp, the construction of a documentation centre as a "place of information, remembrance and encounter" in front of the former Kaufering VII concentration camp was themed for the first time in 2012. This initiative of the European Holocaust Memorial Foundation prompted the Stiftung Bayerische Gedenkstätten to commission a feasibility study for a documentation site of the former Kaufering concentration camps remote complex in 2015, which was presented in the fall of 2016.

Even more than 75 years after world war II, in 2021 it's only possible to visite the European Holocaust Memorial after pre-registration and with accompaniment.

== Pictures of Kaufering VII ==
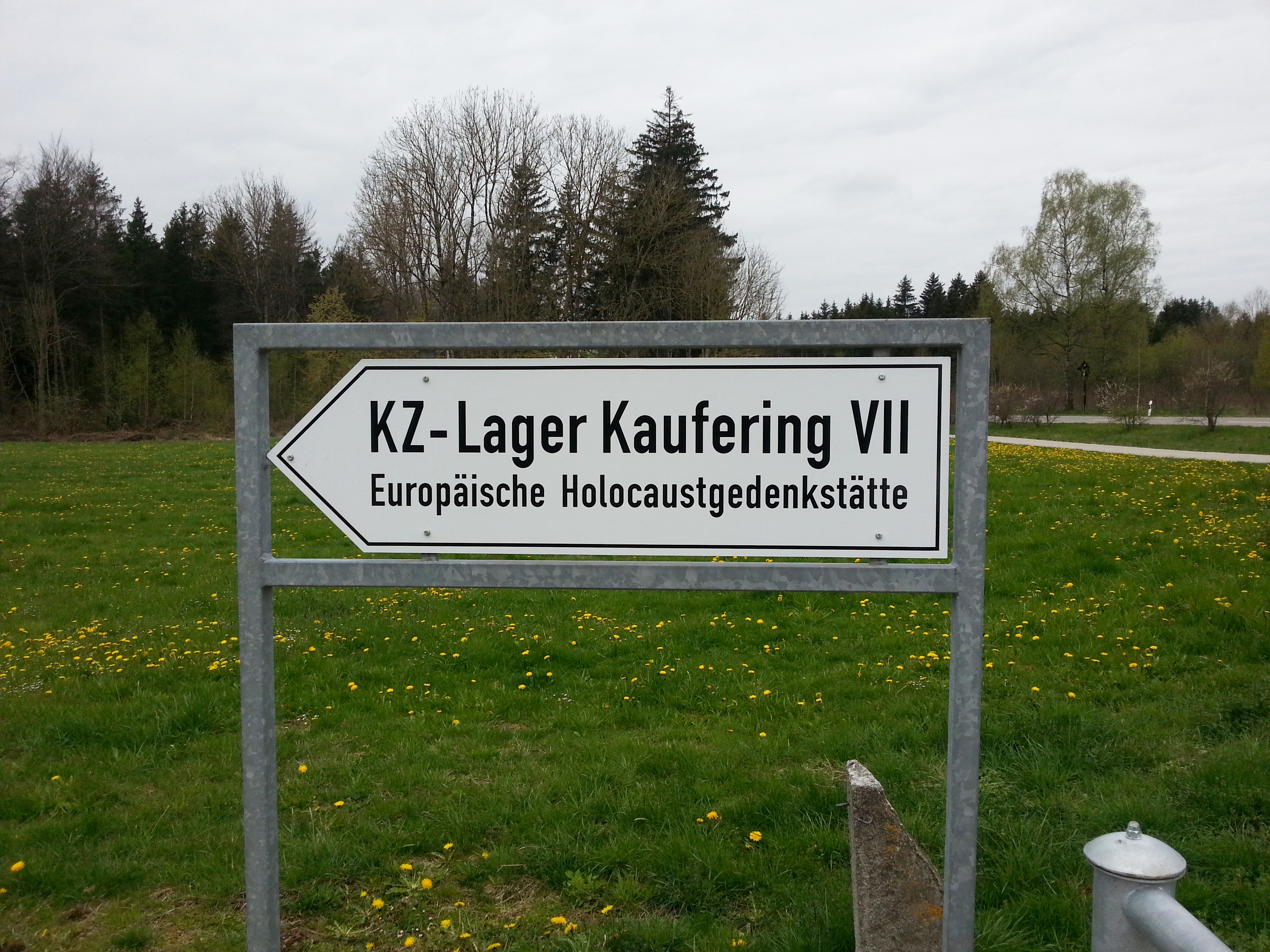
Information sign in the parking lot

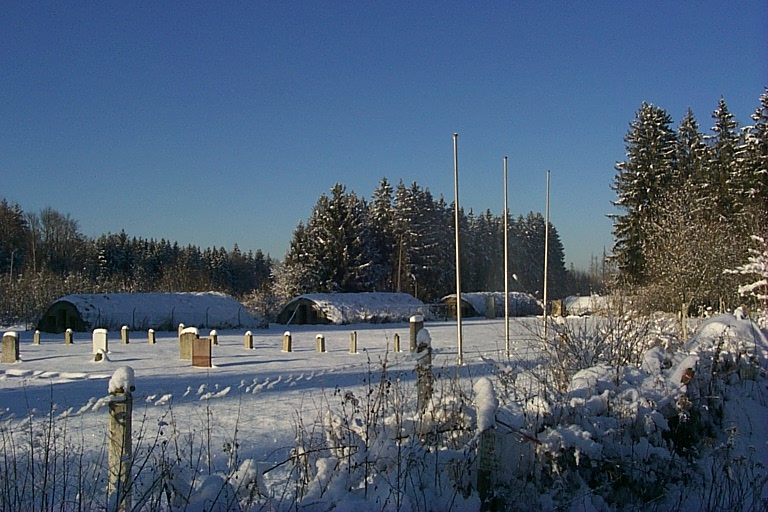
Memorial site in winter 2015

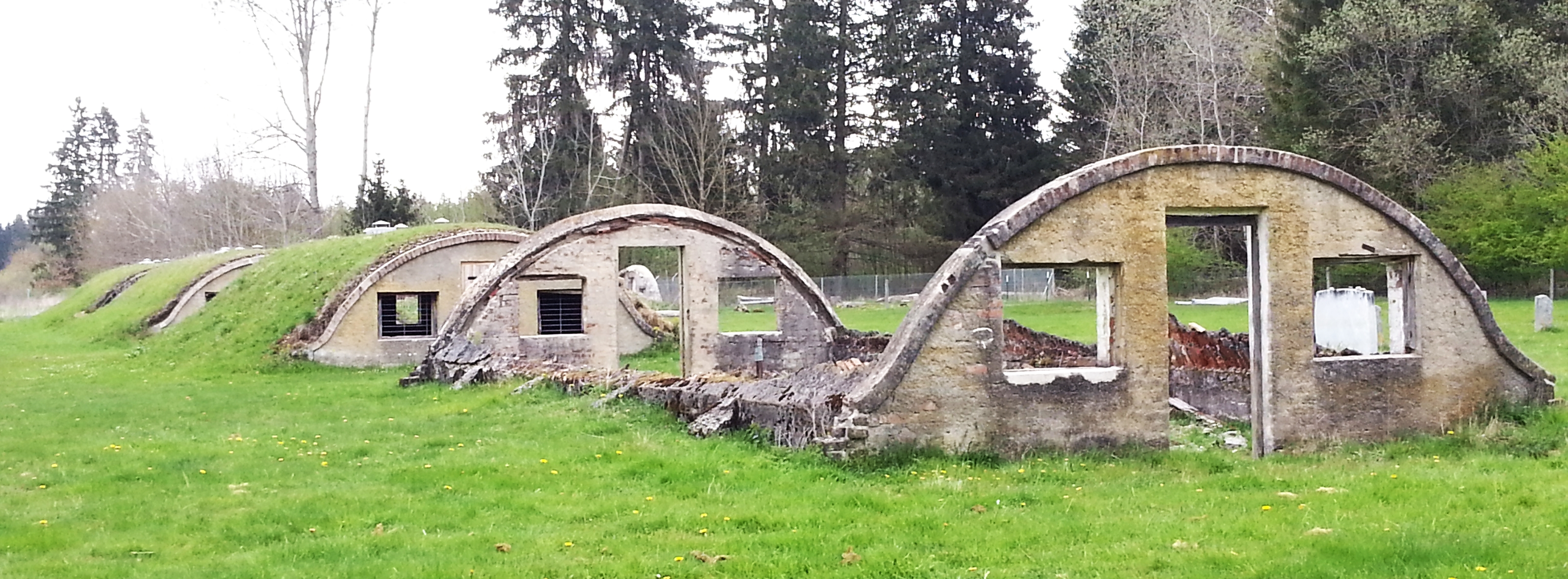
Residential barracks

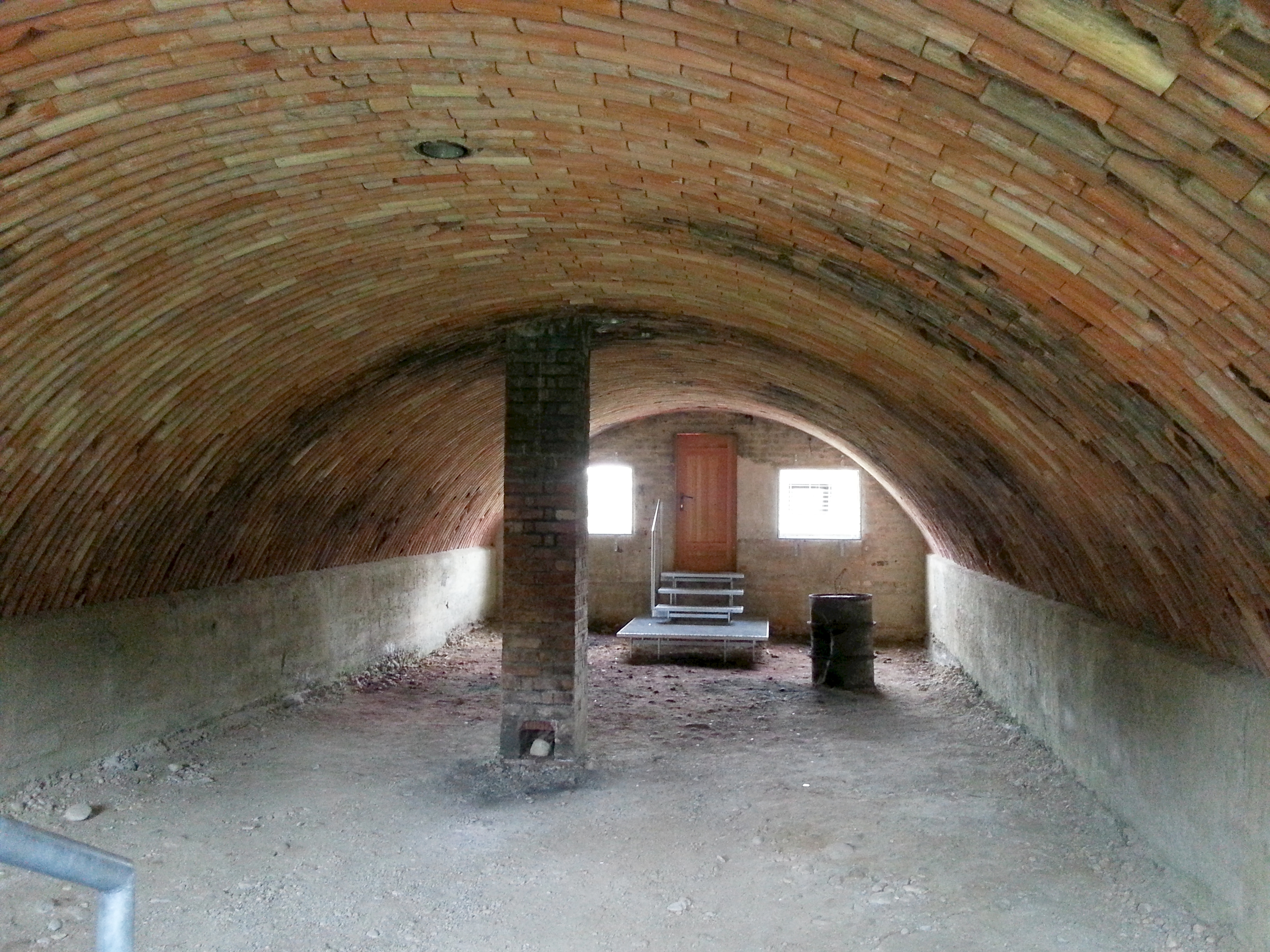
Residential barrack interior view

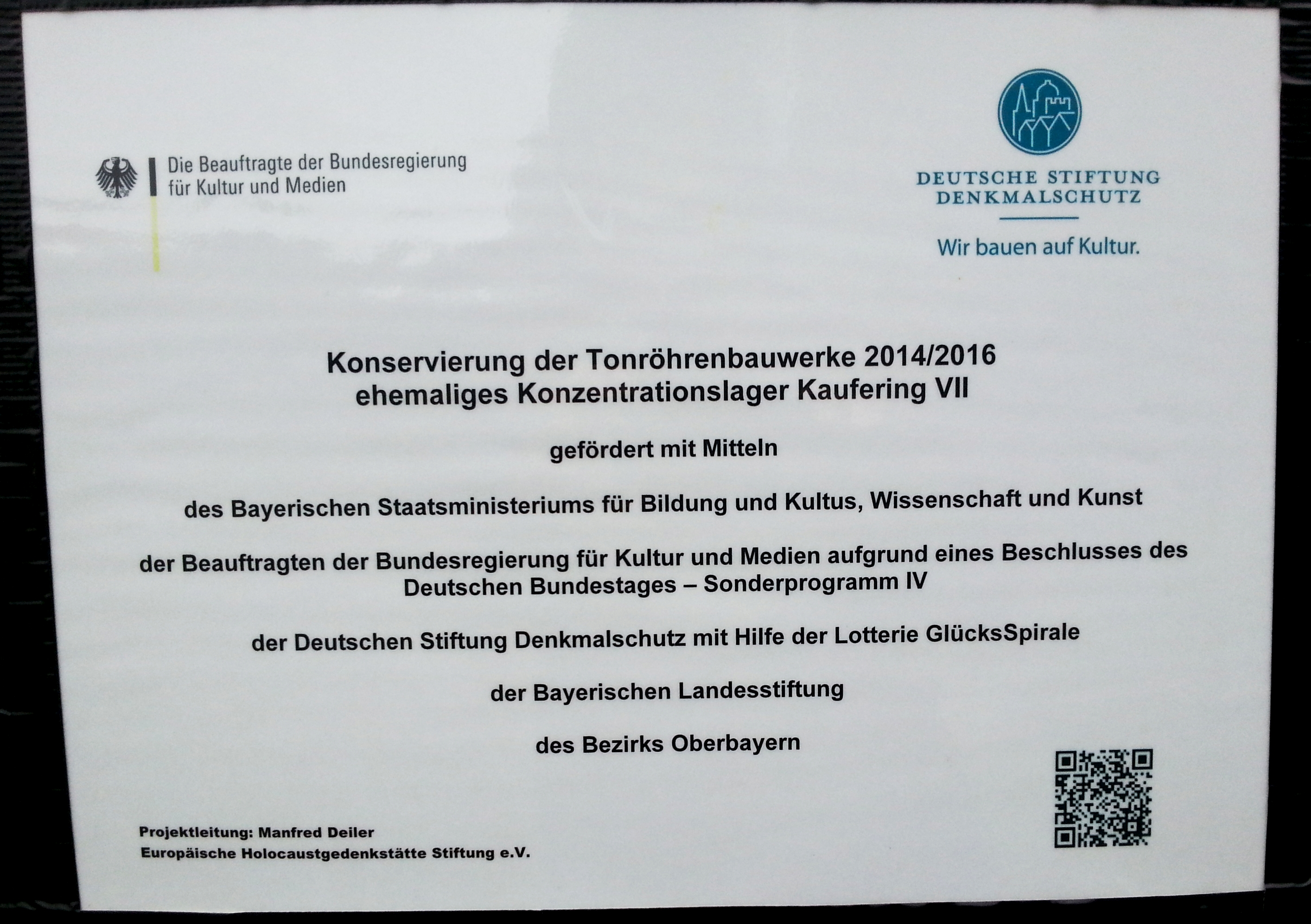
Info about the clay tube construction

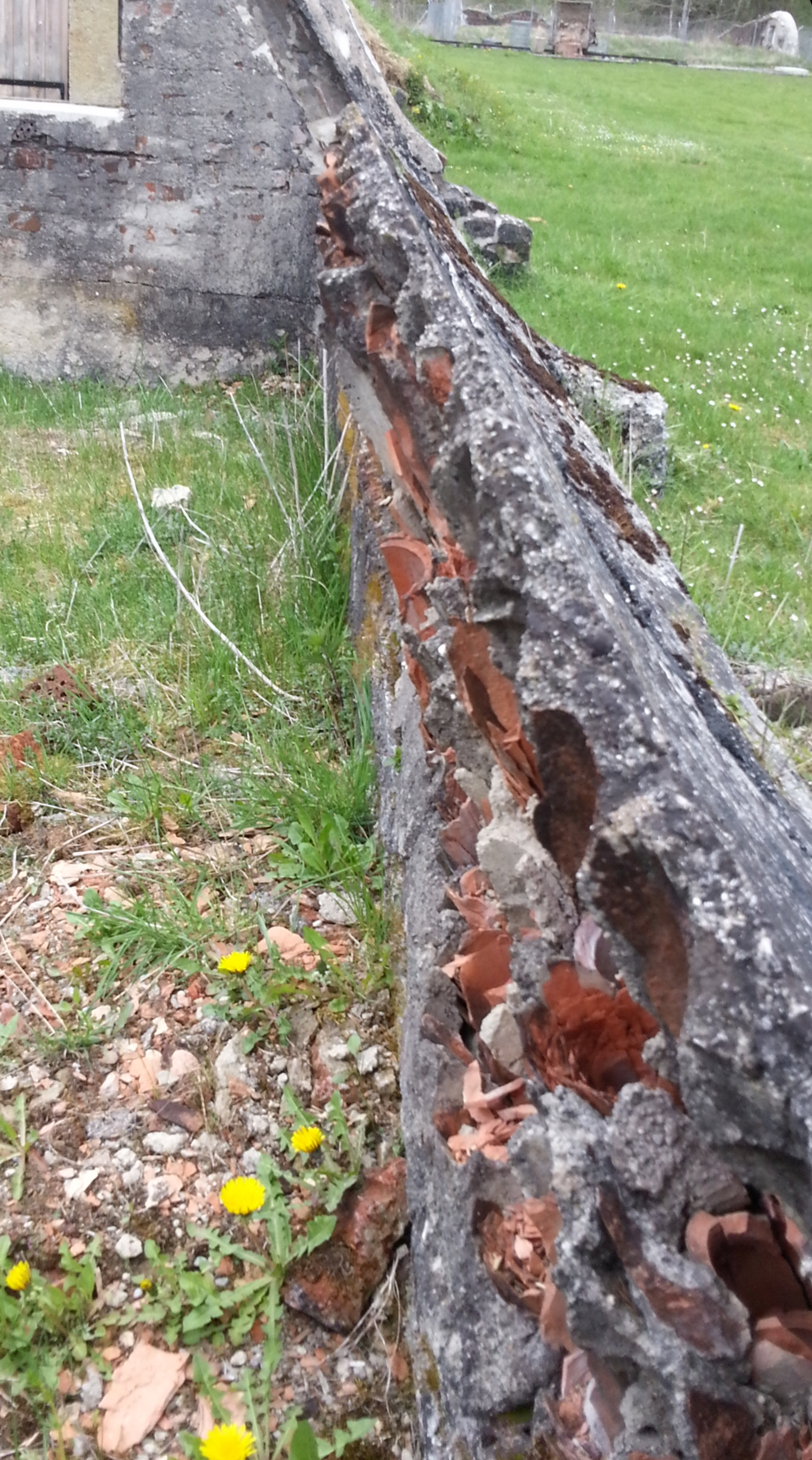
Clay tube roof foundation

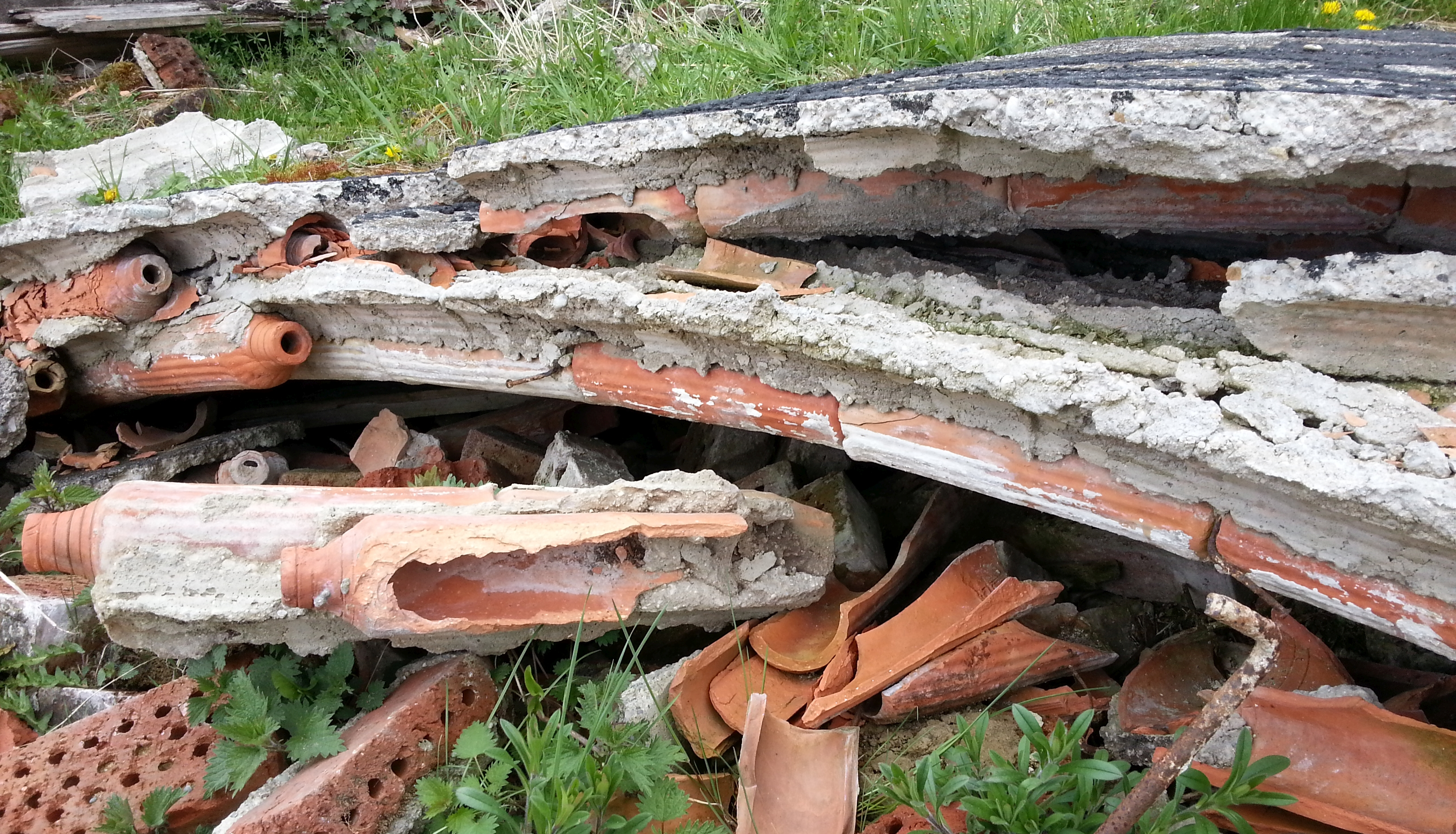
Clay tube roof collapsed

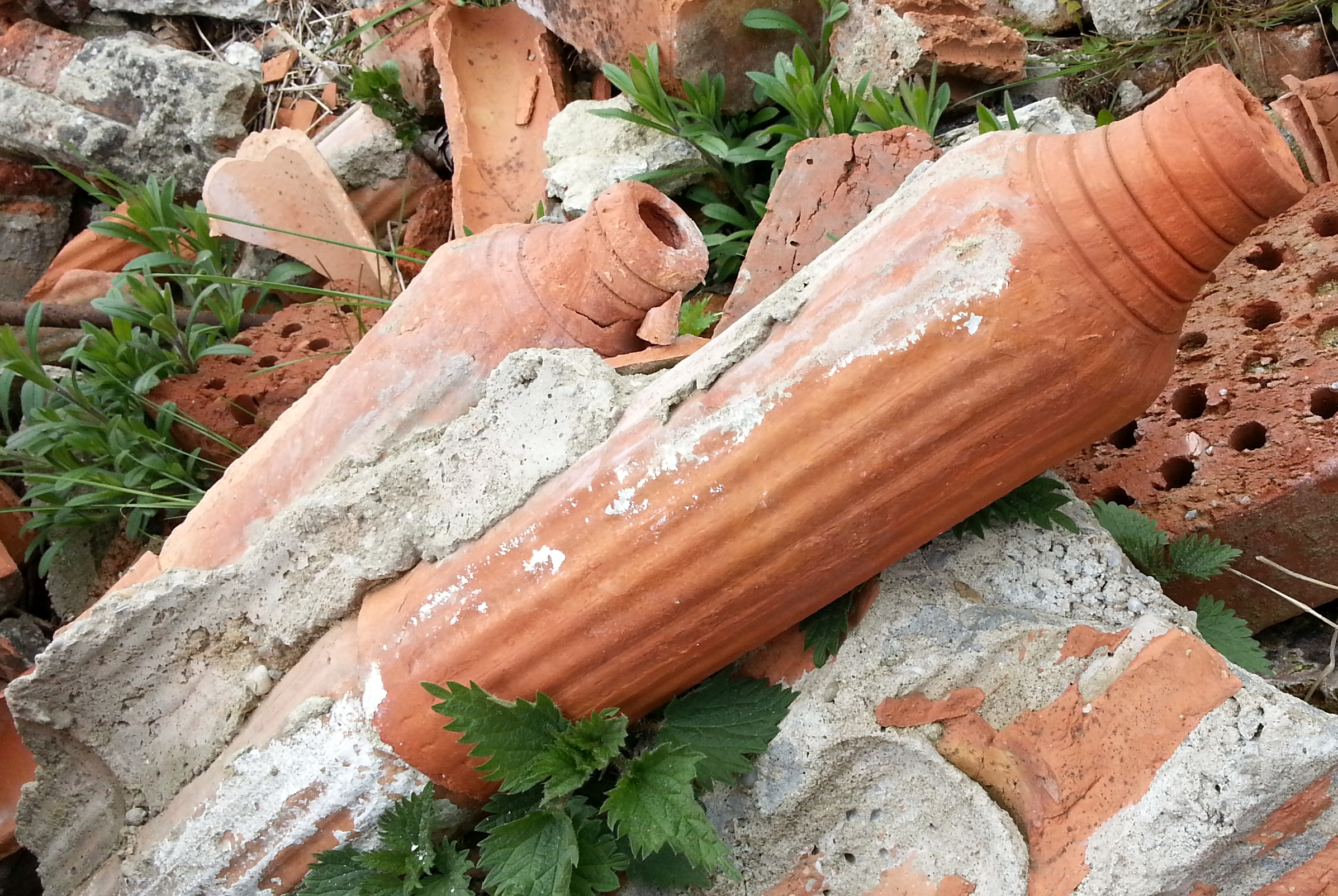
Clay tube in Detail

== The goal: one stone from each country ==
Anton Posset and the Citizens' Association of Landsberg approached all European presidents with the request to donate a memorial stone in memory of the victims from the respective country in the 20th century. This idea was born in 1993, after the original draft could not be realised due to numerous resistances and a lack of financial support. The civic association wrote to a total of 15 European presidents. In the course of time, a European monument against totalitarianism and violence was to be created, which would make the European dimension of the Holocaust clear. With the exception of the German Federal Presidents Herzog and Rau, the civic association has so far received no rejections. On the contrary, the contacted presidents, royal dynasties and princely dynasties reacted positively. A response from Italy and Greece is still missing. Eleven heads of state have responded to the requests.

== List of Cemeteries of Kaufering subcamps ==
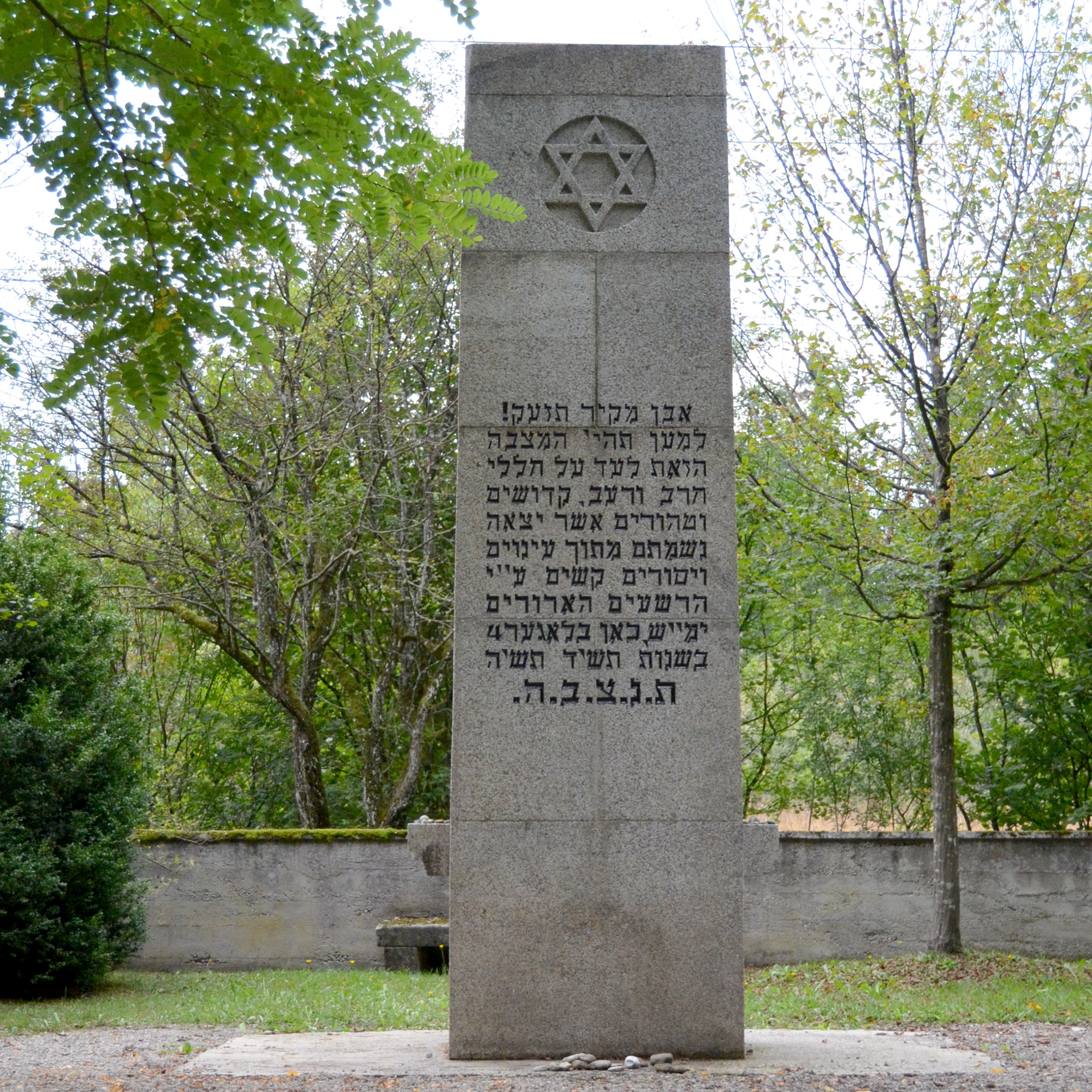
The concentration camp cemetery Kaufering-Nord in the north of Kaufering, at a mass grave with 2000–2500 victims.

Existing burial sites and cemeteries of the victims:
