= Zec =

Zec or ZEC may refer to:

- Zcash, a cryptocurrency
- Zec (surname)

- Philip Zec - a British political cartoonist who usually signed his work with only his surname

- Zone d'exploitation contrôlée, conservation areas in the Canadian province of Quebec
- Zimbabwe Electoral Commission
