= List of tallest buildings in Bremen =

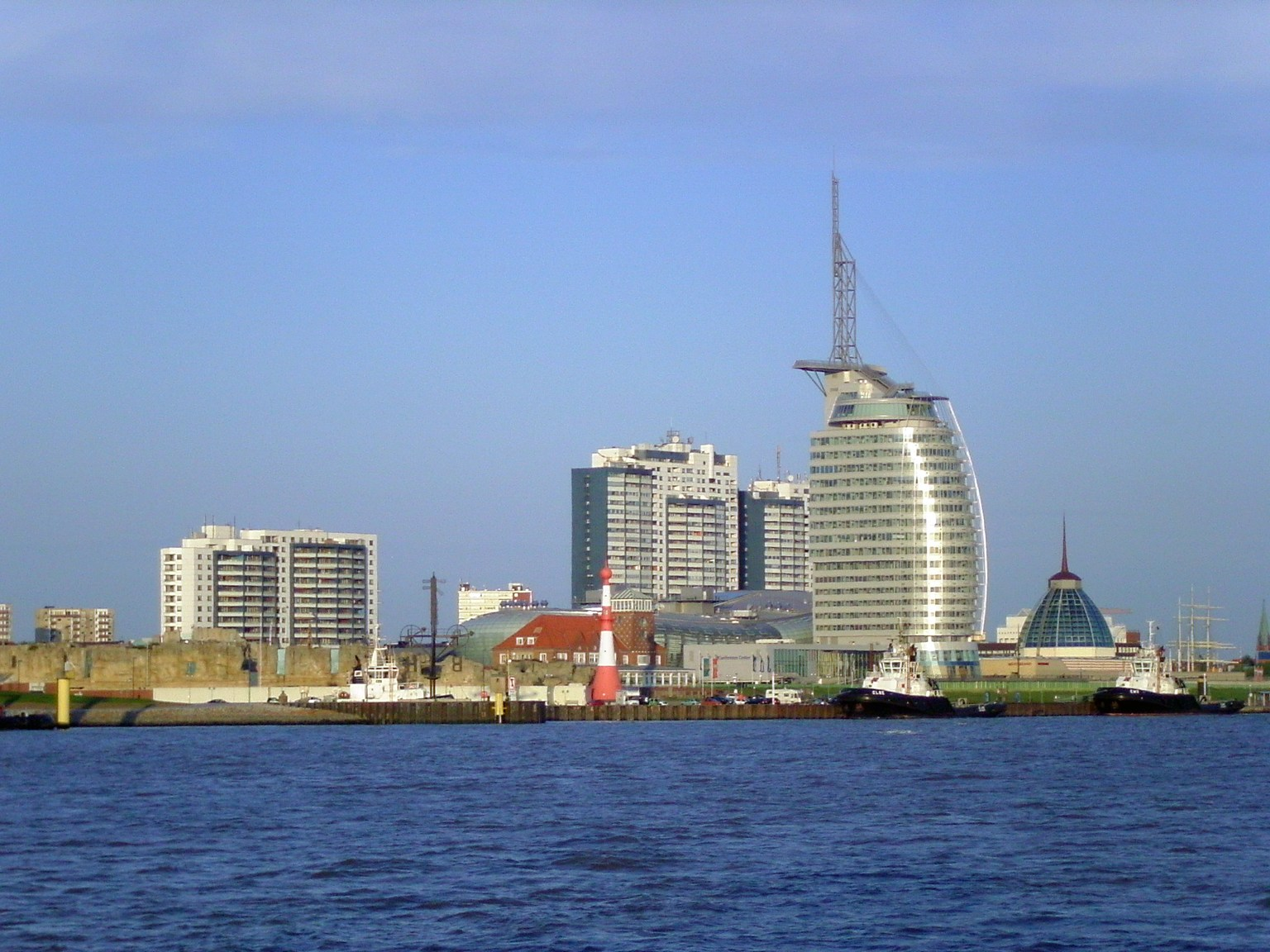
Atlantic Hotel Sail City and Columbus-Center in Bremerhaven

This list of tallest buildings in Bremen (state) ranks high-rise buildings and important landmarks that reach a height of 50 meters (164 feet). The tallest structure in the city state is by far the 235.7-meter-high Bremen TV tower, a telecommunication tower built in 1986.

Bremen is the smallest and least populous of the 16 federal states in Germany and consists of just two cities, the city of Bremen and its seaport exclave, Bremerhaven. There are high-rise buildings in both cities, but the two tallest, Atlantic Hotel Sail City and Columbus Center I, are located in the smaller city of Bremerhaven and only the third tallest belongs to the state capital Bremen. However, the city of Bremen has a larger number of high-rise buildings overall.

== Bremen ==
Rank	Name	Image	Height m (ft)	Floors	Year completed	Use / Note
	Bremen TV tower		235.7 m (773 ft)		1986	Telecommunications tower, Tallest structure in the federal state of Bremen
	Fallturm Bremen		146 m (479 ft)		1990	Drop tower at the Center of Applied Space Technology and Microgravity at the University of Bremen.
	Bremen Cathedral		92.3 m (303 ft)		14th century	
	Church of Our Lady, Bremen		84.2 m (276 ft)		13th century	
1	Weser Tower		82 m (269 ft)	22	2010	Tallest building in Bremen
2	Zech Haus		82 m (269 ft)	18	2022	Headquarters of Zech, Part of the building ensemble at the Europahafenkopf.
	St. Stephani (Bremen)		75 m (246 ft)		13th century	
3	Landmark-Tower		67 m (220 ft)	19	2010	Residential
4	Aalto-Hochhaus		65 m (213 ft)	22	1961	Residential
5	Neuwieder Straße 23		62 m (203 ft)	21	1976	Residential
	St. Martin's Church, Bremen		62 m (203 ft)		14th century	
6	Siemens-Hochhaus		61 m (200 ft)	16	1962	Seat of the Building Department of the Senator for the Environment, Building and Transport.
7	Bundeswehrhochhaus		60 m (197 ft)	15	1968	Former seat of district recruiting office
8	Almatastraße 29			19	1976	Residential
8	Brenner-Allee 42			19	1977	Residential
9	Lofthaus Nord		56.5 m (185 ft)	14	2022	Part of the building ensemble at the Europahafenkopf.
10	Gotthard-Straße 31			18	1970	Residential
10	Gelderner Straße 2			18	1966	Residential
10	Ludwigshafener Straße 12			17	1977	Residential
10	Ludwigshafener Straße 14			17	1977	Residential
10	„Großer Kurfürst“ Eislebener Straße 31			17	1972	Residential
15	Bydolekstraße 2 (Grohner Düne)		55 m (180 ft)	16	1972	Part of high-rise residential complex „Grohner Düne“.
15	Bydolekstraße 5 (Grohner Düne)		55 m (180 ft)	16	1972	Part of high-rise residential complex „Grohner Düne“.
17	Tivoli-Hochhaus		53 m (174 ft)	16	1962	Seat of the departments of the Senator for Labor, Women, Health, Youth and Social Affairs
18	Hafenhochhaus		51 m (167 ft)	13	1960	Office

== Bremerhaven ==
Rank	Name	Image	Height m (ft)	Floors	Year completed	Use / Note
1	Atlantic Hotel Sail City		147 m (482 ft)	23	2008	Tallest building in the federal state of Bremen
	Richtfunkturm Bremerhaven		107 m (351 ft)		1965	
2	Columbus-Center I		88 m (289 ft)	24	1979	Residential
	Bürgermeister-Smidt-Gedächtniskirche		80 m (262 ft)		1870	
3	Columbus-Center II		78 m (256 ft)	22	1979	
	Christuskirche Bremerhaven-Geestemünde		60 m (197 ft)		1875	
4	Columbus-Center III		58 m (190 ft)	15	1979	Residential
5	Haus des Handwerks		57 m (187 ft)	17	1971	Office, Residential
5	Deichstraße 48			16	1971	Residential

== Proposed ==
Name	Height (m)	Height (ft)	Floors	Year
Sign	70	230	18	Unknown
Hochpunkt	56	184	15	Unknown
Ahoy			13	Unknown
Viertel-Hochhaus			11	Unknown

== Demolished ==
Name	Image	Height m (ft)	Floors	Opened	Demolished	Use / Note
Lloyd Building		~60 m (197 ft)		1910	1969, Damaged during WW2	Administrative headquarters of the shipping company Norddeutscher Lloyd.

== See also ==
- List of tallest buildings in Germany
- List of tallest structures in Germany
