= Zeka =

Zeka is both a given name and a surname. Notable people with the name include:

- Zeka Buljubaša (ca. 1785–1813), Serbian revolutionary captain
- Zeka Goore (born 1984), Ivorian footballer
- Zeka Laplaine (born 1960), Democratic Republic of the Congo film director
- Agim Zeka (born 1998), Albanian footballer
- Aurora Zeka (born 2003), Swiss-Albanian singer
- Eugent Zeka (born 1974), Italian football coach
- Haxhi Zeka (1832–1902), Albanian nationalist leader
- Pretash Zeka Ulaj (1882–1962), Albanian military figure

== See also ==
- Zek (disambiguation)
