= Zech =

Zech is both a given name and a German surname. The surname comes from Middle High German zæhe, zæh, zæch, zāch meaning "tough". Notable people with the name include:

== Surname ==
- Alfred Zech, German child soldier
- Arryn Zech, American voice actress
- Benedikt Zech, Austrian footballer
- Benno Zech, German teacher and politician
- Carlferdinand Zech, German musicologist, composer and choir conductor
- Frederick Zech Jr. (1858–1926), American composer
- Hans Walter Zech-Nenntwich, German SS member
- Harry Zech (born 1969), Liechtenstein footballer
- Julius August Christoph Zech (1821–1864), German astronomer
  - Zech's logarithm
- Julius von Zech-Burkersroda (1885–1946), German diplomat
- Jürgen Zech (born 1965), Liechtenstein politician
- Karl Zech, German SS-Gruppenführer
- Karin Zech-Hoop (born 1973), Liechtenstein politician
- Lore Zech, German geneticist and cytogenetics researcher
- Luiz Zech, Brazilian volleyball player
- Paul Zech, German writer and poet
- Reinhold Zech (born 1948), German footballer
- Rosel Zech (1942–2011), German actress
- Tobias Zech (born 1981), German politician

== Forename ==
- Zech McPhearson, American football player
- Zech Medley, English footballer
- Zech Obiero, English footballer
- Zech Pluister, vocalist of American pop punk band Sleep On It
- Zech Smith (Jack Talos), American wrestler

== See also ==
- 2623 Zech, an asteroid
- Zech, a district of Lindau, Germany
- Zeck
