= Havenwelten =

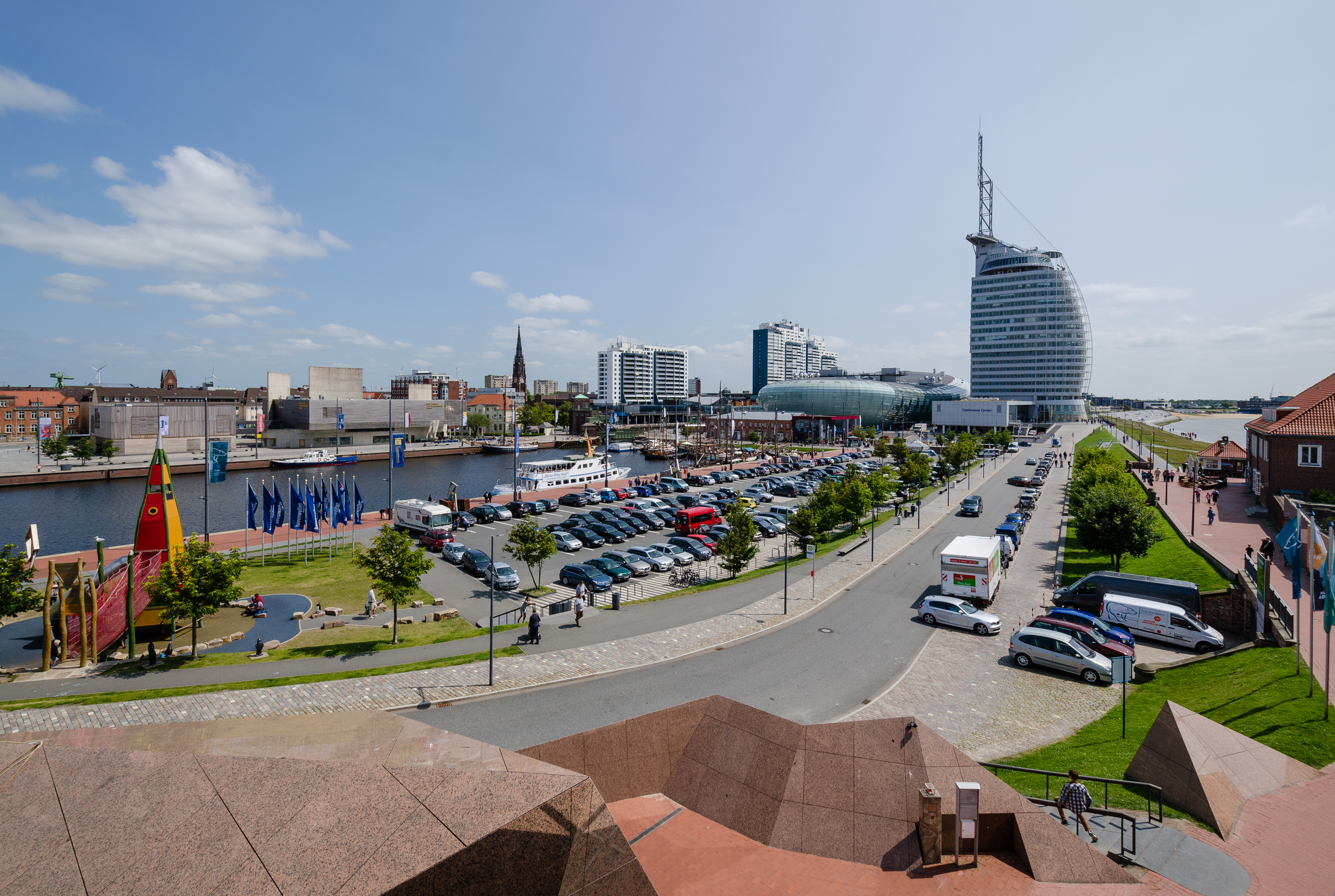
View over the Havenwelten (2013)

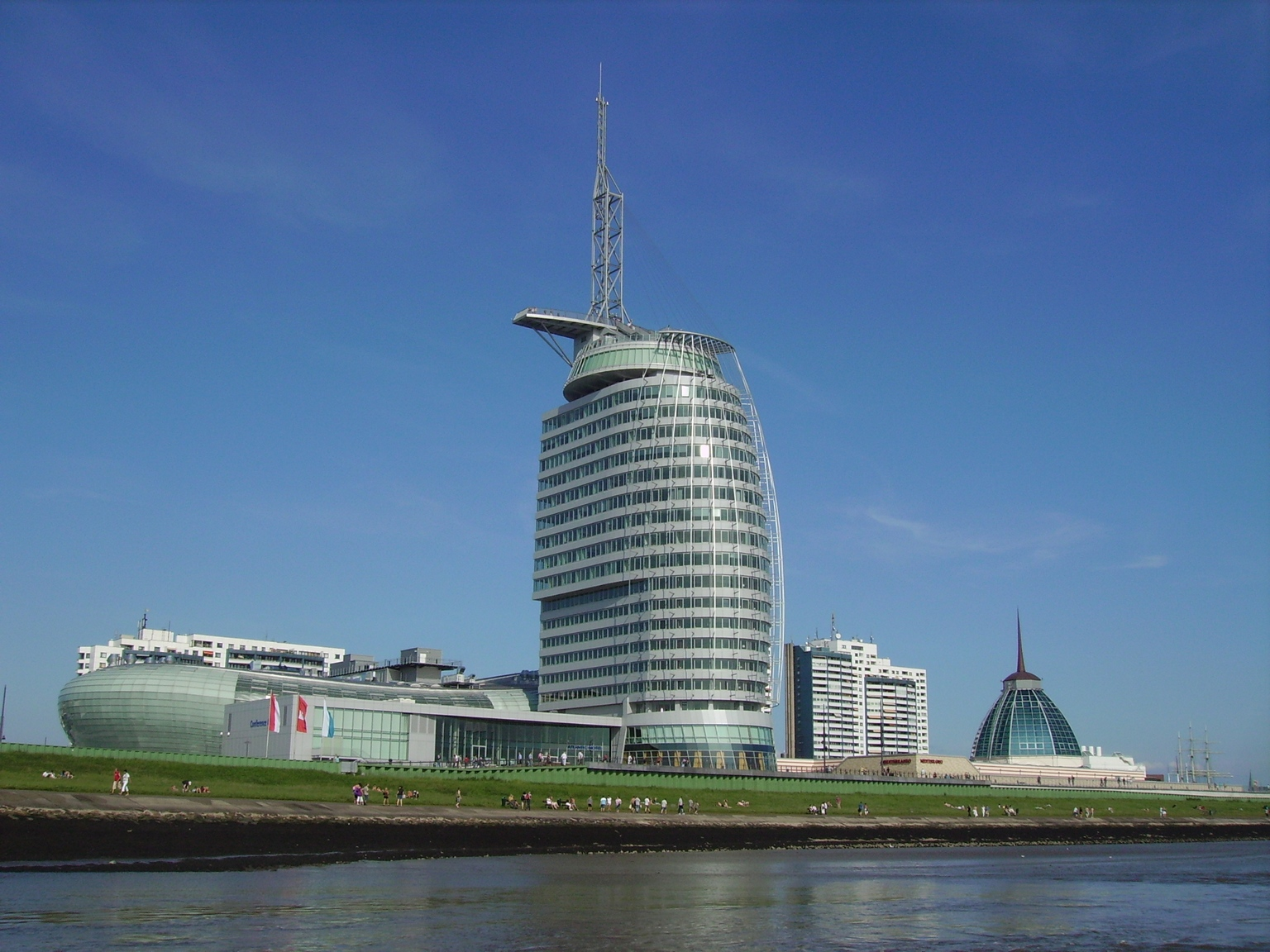
Klimahaus (left), Atlantic Hotel Sail City (center) and Mediterraneo (right)

The Havenwelten (Harbour worlds) is a maritime-styled quarter in Bremerhaven. It includes the Atlantic Hotel Sail City, the Climate House® Bremerhaven 8° East, the shopping mall Mediterraneo, the Deutsches Schifffahrtsmuseum (German Shipping Museum), the Bremerhaven Zoo (Zoo am Meer) and other maritime-themed places.
