= Erpfting =

Human settlement in Germany

Erpfting Erpfting
- Borough
- Interactive map of Erpfting
- Location within Germany
- Coordinates: 48°01′20″N 10°49′40″E
- Country: Germany
- State: Bavaria
- District: Landsberg am Lech
- Municipality: Landsberg am Lech
- Time zone: UTC+1 (CET)
  - Summer (DST): UTC+2 (CEST)
- Postal code: 86899
- Area code: +49 8191
- ISO 3166 code: DE-BY

Erpfting is a borough of Landsberg am Lech in the district of Landsberg in Bavaria in Germany.

On Ringstrasse in Erpfing, there is a 250-year-old deadwood oak tree that remains as a natural monument and biotope.

== Gallery ==
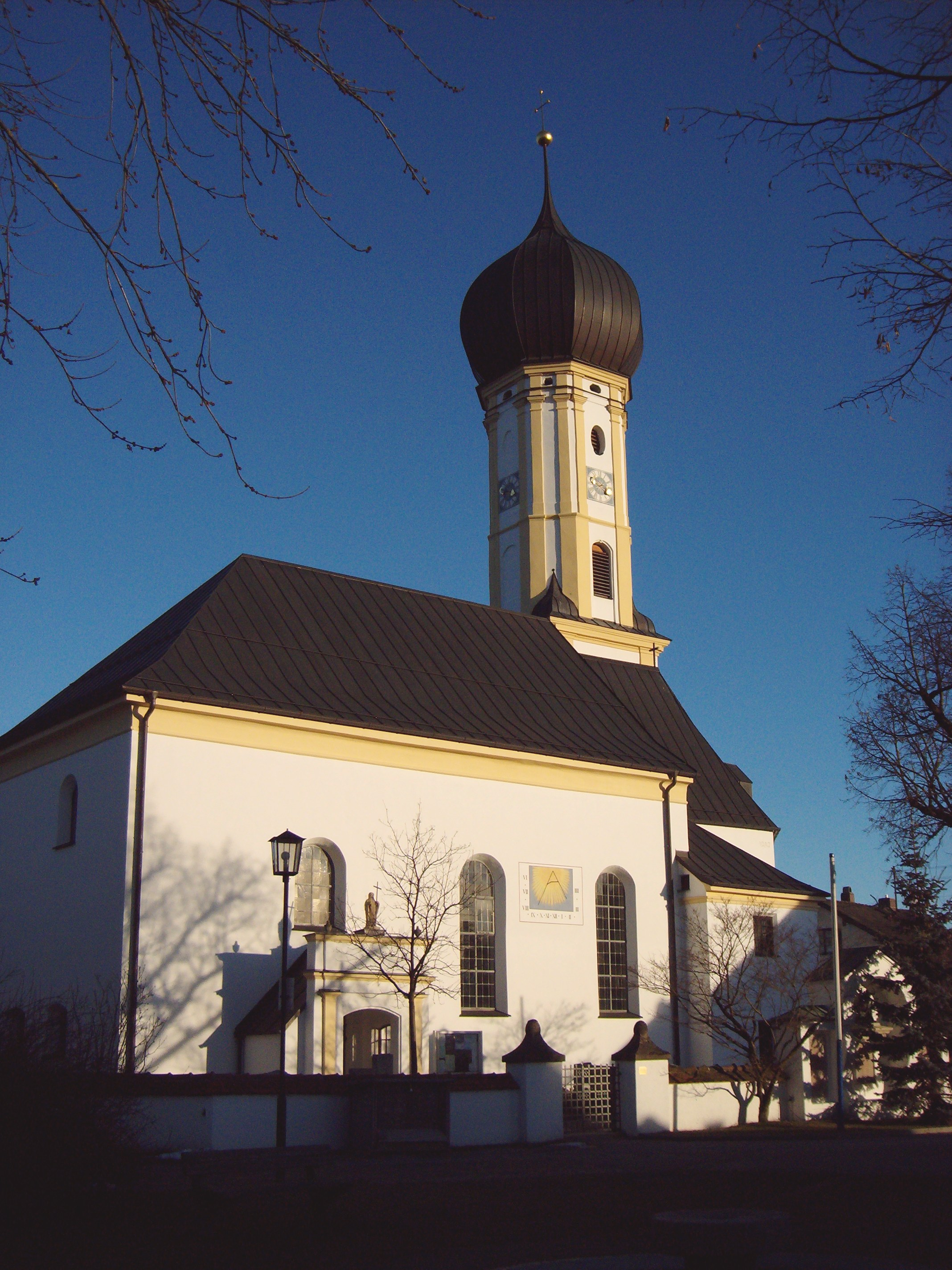
Saint Michael's church, Erpfting
