= Zek =

Zek may refer to:

- Centre for the Study of the Causes of the War (Zentralstelle zur Erforschung der Kriegschuldfrage), a think-tank based in Berlin
- Zek z/k, or zeka, a term for inmates in the Soviet Union and modern Russia, originated in Gulags, see White Sea–Baltic Canal#Commemoration
- Zentralstelle für Kreditinformation, a Swiss organisation centralizing and listing every credit attached to someone

== Fictional characters ==
- Achmet Zek, a character from the serial film Tarzan the Tiger
- Zek, a character from the TV series Star Trek: Deep Space Nine
- Zek Chelovek (Russian for "Prisoner" "Human Being"), a character in the 2012 action movie Jack Reacher

== See also ==
- Zeck
