= Frederick Zech Jr. =

American composer (1858–1926)

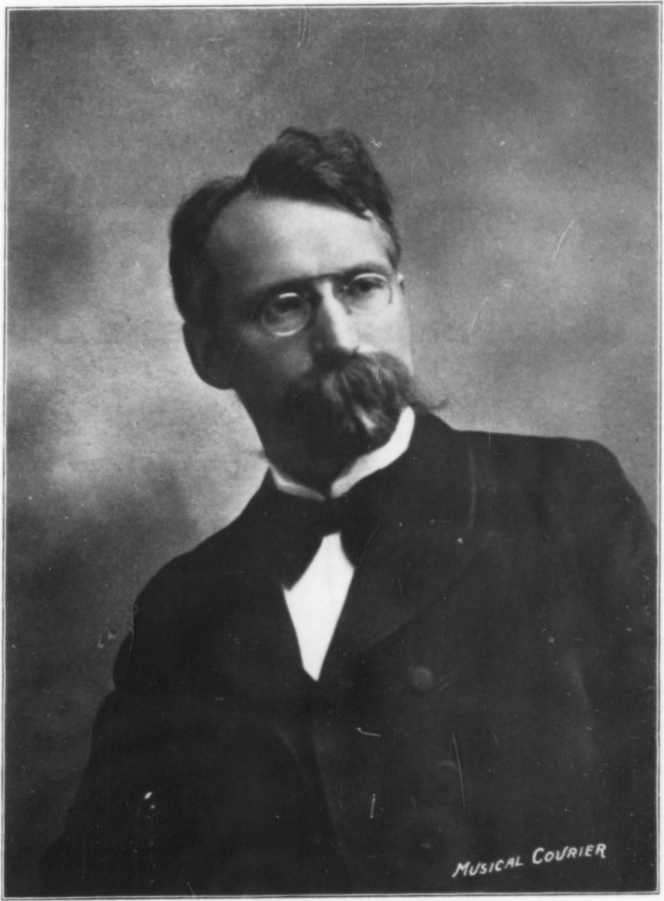
Frederick Zech Jr.

Frederick Zech Jr. (May 10, 1858 – October 15, 1926) was an American composer, pianist, conductor, and teacher.

Zech was born in Philadelphia on May 10, 1858 and lived in San Francisco from 1860, where he studied with L. Heckmanns and R. Schumacher. From 1877 he studied with Theodor Kullak (piano), Emil Breslaur (theory), and Franz Neumann (composition) in Berlin. He taught piano at the Neue Akademie der Tonkunst from 1880 to 1882. Zech returned to San Francisco in 1882, where he organized an orchestral concert of his own compositions on November 30, 1882. Zech became a teacher of advanced piano playing, organized and conducted concerts in the city (1882–1902), and was conductor of the San Francisco Symphony Orchestra. From 1902 to 1903 he organized and directed symphony concerts of his tone poems. Later Zech taught at the Notre Dame de Namur University. He died in San Francisco on October 15, 1926.

The composer's manuscripts are kept at the Music Library of the University of California, Berkeley. Among his compositions are five symphonies, five symphonic poems, concertos, sonatas, songs, and two operas. His symphonic poems were performed in Germany and San Francisco. Zech wrote two operas: La Paloma in Spanish style, and Wa-Kin-Yon, a North American Indian opera, with librettos by Mary Fairweather-Widemann.
