= Zeck =

Zeck is a surname. Notable people with the surname include:

- Arnold Zeck, a fictional character in the Nero Wolfe crime novels by Rex Stout
- Eduard Zeck (1862–1940), German politician
- Emil Hermann Zeck (1891–1963), Australian entomologist and scientific illustrator
- Juli Zeck (born 1962), Hungarian actress.
- Mike Zeck (born 1949), American comic book illustrator
- Nick Zeck (born 1983), American football player
- William A. Zeck (1915-2002), New York State judge and prosecutor at the Nuremberg trials

== See also ==
- Zech
- Zec (surname)
