= Atlantic Hotel Sail City =

Skyscraper in Bremerhaven, Germany

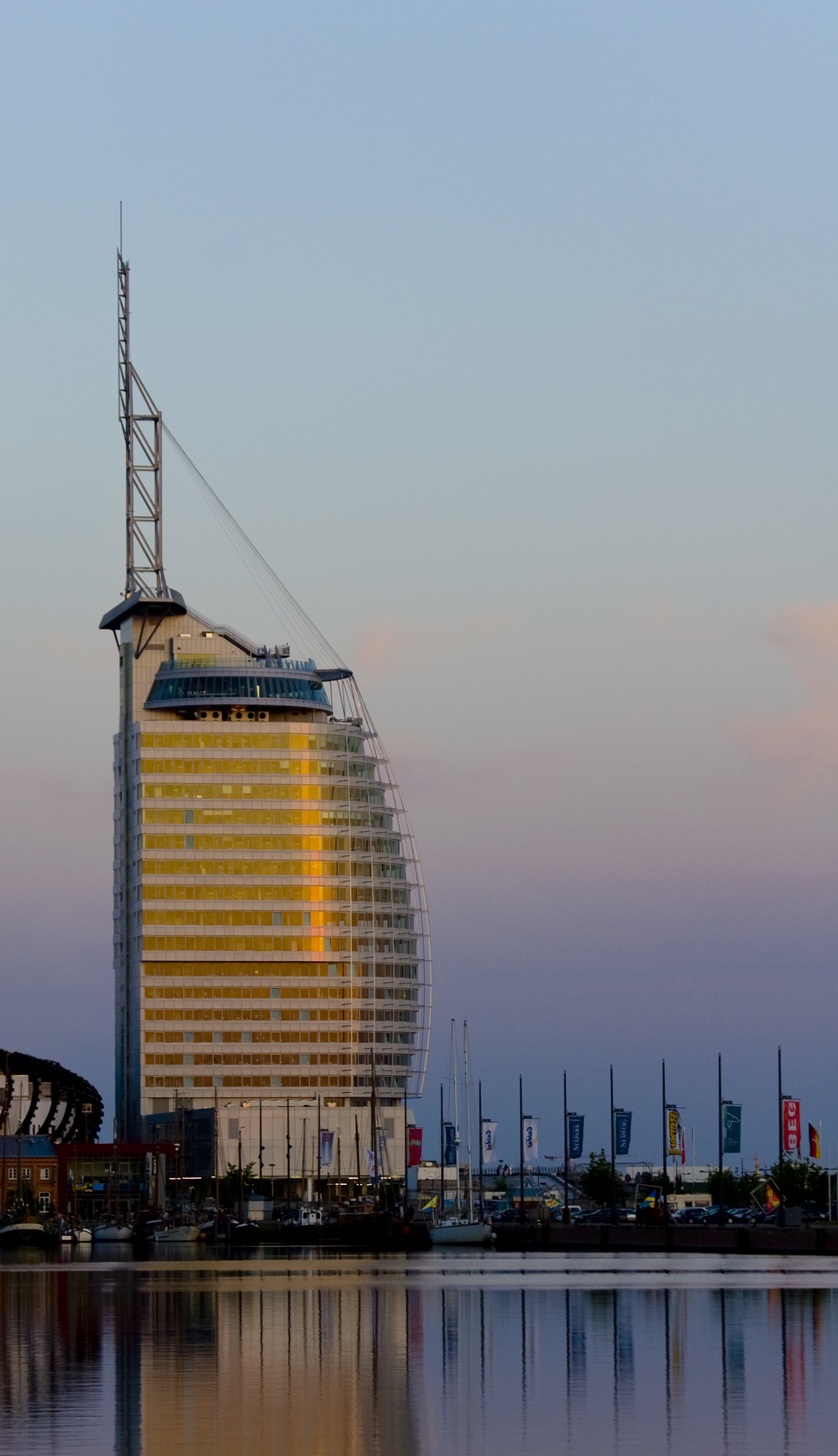
- Interactive map of the Atlantic Hotel Sail City area

General information
- Status: Completed
- Type: Mixed-use: Hotel / Office
- Location: Bremerhaven, Germany, 1 Am Strom, Bremerhaven, Germany
- Coordinates: 53.54297°N 8.57347°E
- Construction started: 2006
- Completed: 2008

Height
- Antenna spire: 147 m (482 ft)
- Roof: 86 m (282 ft)

Technical details
- Structural system: Concrete
- Floor count: 21

Design and construction
- Architect: Thomas Klumpp

The Atlantic Hotel Sail City is a mixed-use high-rise building in Bremerhaven, Germany. Built between 2006 and 2008, the tower stands at an official height of 147 m (482 ft) tall by antenna spire (86 m (282 ft) by roof height) with 21 floors and is the current tallest building in the German state of Bremen.

== History ==
=== Architecture ===
The sail-shaped building on the Weser dyke in Bremerhaven and was designed by the Bremen architectural firm Klumpp Architekten led by German architect Thomas Klumpp. With a total height of 147 metres and 23 floors (86 metres without the spire), it is the highest accessible building in the state of Bremen and it highly resembles the Burj Al Arab hotel in Dubai.

It was built between 2006 and 2008 in the Old Harbor/New Harbor area next to the Climate House Bremerhaven, the German Emigration Center, a shopping center and the German Maritime Museum and, as part of the Havenwelten, is intended to boost tourism in the city.

The actual Atlantic Hotel Sail City (own spelling ATLANTIC Hotel Sail City) is a four-star hotel that belongs to the hotel cooperation Atlantic Hotels, part of the Zech Group. It is located on the lower 8 floors of the building, has a restaurant on the ground floor, 120 rooms and event rooms with panoramic views on the 19th floor: the Captains Lounge. Meeting rooms for a total of 1,000 participants are located in the attached Conference Center.

Floors 9 to 17 are rented out as office and practice space, with bremenports as the anchor tenant. The 18th floor is used for building services. The viewing platform, which is also accessible from outside and requires an entrance fee, is located on the 20th floor at a height of 77 metres. From there, stairs lead to a second viewing platform at a height of 86 metres.

The Havenwelten parking garage, operated by Stäpark, extends beneath the Atlantic Hotel Sail City and the neighboring Klimahaus and shopping center. It has 1,000 parking spaces.

== See also ==
- List of tallest buildings in Bremen
- List of tallest buildings in Germany
