= Anton Posset =

German Holocaust historian and teacher

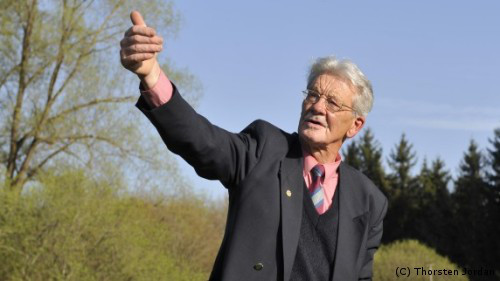
Anton Posset

Anton Posset (Munich, September 25, 1941 – September 10, 2015 in Halblech) was a German historian, secondary school teacher, and Holocaust researcher.

Posset was known beyond the borders of Bavaria above all as a critical local historian and, in particular, as a result of his pioneering work in connection with the Dachau subsidiary concentration camps of Landsberg/Kaufering and the preservation of the Kaufering VII concentration camp, today the European Holocaust Memorial. The Yad Vashem memorial awarded him the Yad Vashem Prize for his activities in connection with work of remembrance.

== Life ==
Anton Posset studied history and the teaching of French at LMU Munich, followed by internships in Lyon and Munich. He began his first teaching position in 1972, at the Simon-Marius-Gymnasium in Gunzenhausen, before then moving to the Dominikus-Zimmermann-Gymnasium in Landsberg am Lech in 1975. There, he dedicated himself to German-Jewish reconciliation and to addressing the history of the 20th century in postwar Germany. At that point in time, such an interest was not without considerable social taboos. The term "work of remembrance" was totally unfamiliar to large segments of the population.

=== School research projects and the Citizens' Association Landsberg in the 20th Century ===
Everything began with a secondary school student research project on the Kaufering concentration camp and the "Ringeltaube" defense project that he supervised, which Federal President Karl Carstens awarded first prize in the German History Student Competition in 1983/84. Anton Posset had already supervised six other student projects for this competition, which had repeatedly been awarded high-level prizes in this competition on a national level since 1976. In 1984 he also established the "Landsberg im 20. Jahrhundert – Bürgervereinigung zur Erforschung der Landsberger Zeitgeschichte e.V." (Citizens' Association—Landsberg in the 20th Century) association, and served as its chairman for thirty years, until his death. As a result of his engagement and passionate dedication, with the assistance of the local Jewish businessman and Holocaust survivor Alexander Moksel, it became possible to purchase parts of the grounds of the Kaufering VII concentration camp that were still preserved. Under his leadership as chairman, the association persuaded the then Bavarian Minister President, Franz J. Strauss, of the value of making the last surviving earth huts at the former Kaufering VII Jewish concentration camp into a memorial, thus ensuring that their preservation was an objective in the "interest of the general public."

Anton Posset was a driving force behind the further development of the Citizens' Association—Landsberg in the 20th Century, as well as in the restoration and maintenance of the then-overgrown grounds of the Kaufering VII concentration camp. In 1989, he initiated the creation of the first Holocaust memorial in the Federal Republic of Germany, the European Holocaust Memorial, with the erection of commemorative stones by eleven European heads of state and the initiation of the "Weg der Menschenrechte und der Menschenwürde" (Path of Human Rights and Human Dignity).

In his activities as a secondary school teacher, he supervised students as a tutor in total of fourteen national history competitions. Three of these in-depth projects were awarded first prize. In the years 1975 to 1980, he was a member of the academic advisory board of the "German History" student competition and of the central jury of the Körber-Stiftung, and established the regional jury for the history competition for Upper Bavaria, in Munich. He always had a sympathetic ear for the young people involved and gladly supported pupils and students with his advice.

As an author and member of the editorial board for the "Themenhefte Landsberger Zeitgeschichte" (Special Issues on the Contemporary History of Landsberg) series of publications, he made a considerable contribution to the success of this series of journals.

As a co-author and educator, he contributed his methodological and didactic expertise and experience to the four-volume history work Erinnern und Urteilen – Unterrichtseinheiten Geschichte für Bayern (Remembrance and Judgment—History Lessons for Bavaria) for the middle secondary school level under the rubric "discovery learning".

For his dedication to German-Israeli reconciliation and work of remembrance, in Jerusalem in 1990, Yad Vashem awarded him the Yad Vashem Prize, the highest prize that the memorial awards to honor future generations. He presented the Das Ende des Holocaust in Bayern (The End of the Holocaust in Bavaria) exhibition at Beit Hatfutsot—The Museum of the Jewish People in Tel Aviv. In front of an audience of 400 individuals, he gave a lecture about the Kaufering concentration camp that was highly acclaimed in the Israeli press. Dov Shilansky, the Speaker of the Israeli Knesset at the time and a survivor of the Kaufering concentration camp, described Anton Posset as someone, "who can help Germany rise out of the depths and towards the light. If Germany truly regrets something and wants to compensate for what happened, it must be supported in doing so."

Collaboration with the team of the director/producer Steven Spielberg and Tom Hanks in connection with the ten-part television miniseries Band of Brothers began in 2000. Based on Anton Posset's interviews and image material, for the film shooting in England, it was possible to reconstruct a subsidiary concentration camp, in which the liberation of the Jewish Kaufering/Landsberg concentration camp was then depicted and subsequently liberated by Allied troops in episode 9 ("Why We Fight").

=== Oral history ===
He collected a great deal of information in his many interviews with contemporary witnesses, including a large number of the survivors of the concentration camps around Landsberg. The perhaps most well known individual among them was Viktor Frankl, the neurologist and founder of logotherapy.

Based on this information and historical documents from various archives, it became possible, above all in the 1990s, for various descendants of concentration camp survivors to clarify and/or reconstruct the history of their family members or their places of burial.

Anton Posset's engagement and compiling of information also resulted in the inclusion of the engineer Walter Groos in the list of the Righteous Among the Nations at Yad Vashem. Over the course of the years, Anton Posset hence became an important contemporary witness himself. This led to the recording of a several-hour interview with him during one of his visits to Yad Vashem.

=== Private ===
Anton Posset was married to the artist Hélène Posset-Navarro. They have two sons.

== Dealing with work of remembrance ==
In 1988, Joseph Rovan recommended to the Federal President that Anton Posset be awarded the Order of Merit of the Federal Republic of Germany for his exemplary commitment to work of remembrance. This recommendation received the support of the Federal President, but was nonetheless rejected by the Bavarian Minister President at the time, Max Streibl, due to massive intervention by local opposition.

Ostracism, mobbing, and two reassignments as a teacher then followed. By the time he retired, Anton Posset's personnel file at the Bavarian Ministry of Education and the Arts had grown to comprise tens of thousands of pages.

It was first at the start of the 21st century that his work of remembrance was finally belatedly accepted by society.

== Awards ==
- 1990 Yad-Vashem Prize for his lived work of remembrance
- 2000 Honorary Member of the 103rd Infantry Division of World War II responsible for the liberation of the concentration camps Landsberg/Kaufering
- 2009 Étoile Civique d'Or for his services in connection with understanding among nations and lived civil courage
- 2010 Honorary President of the Association “European Holocaust Memorial Foundation”

== Publications ==
=== Books ===
- Erinnern und Urteilen I – 7. Unterrichtseinheit Geschichte für Bayern, Verlag Klett, 1st edition, 1982, ISBN 3-1241310-0-2.
- Erinnern und Urteilen II – 8. Unterrichtseinheit Geschichte für Bayern, Verlag Klett, 1st edition, 1982, ISBN 3-1241320-0-9.
- Erinnern und Urteilen III – 9. Unterrichtseinheit Geschichte für Bayern, Verlag Klett, 1st edition, 1983, ISBN 3-1241330-0-5.
- Erinnern und Urteilen IV – 10. Unterrichtseinheit Geschichte für Bayern, Verlag Klett, 1st edition, 1984, ISBN 3-1241340-0-1.
- „Le voyage de Nuremberg – Sur les traces du 3ème Reich“; G. Verneret, J. Bader, A. Posset; Lyon; Goethe Institut, Bleu du ciel; 2014.

=== Journals ===
- Bürgervereinigung Landsberg im 20. Jahrhundert: Von Hitlers Festungshaft zum Kriegsverbrecher-Gefängnis Nr. 1: Die Landsberger Haftanstalt im Spiegel der Geschichte 1993, ISBN 3-9803775-0-4.
- Bürgervereinigung Landsberg im 20. Jahrhundert: Todesmarsch und Befreiung – Landsberg im April 1945: Das Ende des Holocaust in Bayern, 1993, ISBN 3-9803775-1-2.
- Bürgervereinigung Landsberg im 20. Jahrhundert: Der nationalsozialistische Wallfahrtsort Landsberg: 1933–1937: "Die Hitlerstadt" wird zur "Stadt der Jugend," 1993, ISBN 3-9803775-2-0.
- Bürgervereinigung Landsberg im 20. Jahrhundert: Das KZ-Kommando Kaufering 1944/45: Die Vernichtung der Juden im Rüstungsprojekt "Ringeltaube," 1993, ISBN 3-9803775-3-9.
- Bürgervereinigung Landsberg im 20. Jahrhundert: Das SS-Arbeitslager Landsberg 1944/45: Französische Widerstandskämpfer im deutschen KZ, 1995, ISBN 3-9803775-4-7.
- Bürgervereinigung Landsberg im 20. Jahrhundert: Landsberg 1945–1950: Der jüdische Neubeginn nach der Shoa – Vom DP-Lager Landsberg ging die Zukunft aus, 1996, ISBN 3-9803775-5-5.

== External links (in German) ==
- Tribute to Anton Posset on the homepage of the Bürgervereinigung Landsberg im 20.Jahrhundert
- Landsberger Tagblatt of 13.09.2015: "Anton Posset stirbt in Bergen – er war ein unbequemer Demokrat"
- Süddeutsche Zeitung of 14.09.2015: "Historiker Anton Posset tödlich verunglückt"
- Augsburger Allgemeine of 17.09.2015: "Immer für demokratische Werte eingesetzt"
- Tribute to Anton Posset by the A.F.M.A. (L'Association Fonds Mémoire d'Auschwitz)
