= Why We Fight (Band of Brothers) =

- Band of Brothers episode
- Episode no.: Episode 9
- Directed by: David Frankel
- Written by: John Orloff
- Original air date: October 28, 2001

Episode chronology
← Previous "The Last Patrol"	Next → "Points"

"Why We Fight" is the ninth and penultimate episode of the American television miniseries Band of Brothers. The episode premiered in the United States on HBO on October 28, 2001.

The episode follows Easy Company of the 101st Airborne Division in the final days of World War II, and explores the contrasting emotions between the battle-weary veterans and excitable younger members. Captain Lewis Nixon undergoes personal difficulties such as his divorce and demotion. Meanwhile, a patrol from the company discovers the Kaufering IV concentration camp. The horrors of the camp allow the men to realize the reason for fighting the war as they attend to the survivors.

Receiving positive reviews, it is considered by some critics to be the best episode in the show.

== Plot ==
Easy Company facilitates cleanup in the German village of Thalheim, Saxony. Although Allied victory appears imminent and major combat is all but over, the soldiers watching the scene are still distraught by what they saw a month prior.

In a flashback, Easy has entered Nazi Germany. Captain Lewis Nixon rejoins the company following a combat jump with the 17th Airborne Division, shaken by his plane being shot down and killing the other paratroopers onboard. Nixon also receives a Dear John letter from his wife indicating her intent to divorce him, and is demoted to battalion operations officer. Increasingly disillusioned, he turns to alcohol and begins looking for his favorite whiskey Vat 69. His struggles and the weariness of Easy's experienced soldiers contrast the carefree lifestyles of the younger men who wish to fight. They are also told of President Franklin D. Roosevelt's death.

The company heads to Landsberg, where their convoy drives by a contingent of 300,000 surrendered Wehrmacht soldiers. While the Americans are in motorized vehicles like Jeeps and trucks, the Germans ride on horse-drawn wagons or march on foot. Private David Webster heckles them, questioning why the Allies sacrificed so much to fight such a pathetic adversary.

Nixon continues to search for whiskey, during which he breaks into the house of a German officer and is confronted by his widow. T-4 Frank Perconte leads a patrol through the forest until they find a concentration camp whose guards have already fled.

Major Richard Winters is informed of the discovery and heads to the camp with the rest of Easy, who are horrified by the sight. Corporal Joseph Liebgott translates a survivor's testimony, revealing the other prisoners are Jews, Poles, and Gypsies. The unit explores the camp, coming across piles of bodies while starving inmates approach them out of gratitude or to plead for help. Easy returns to the village to collect food for the survivors, but are urged to avoid feeding them due to the risk of refeeding syndrome and to keep them in the camp to prevent disease from spreading. Liebgott reluctantly obliges and relays the news to the prisoners.

The village populace, who denied knowing about the camp, is ordered by Major General Maxwell Taylor to clean it up. Nixon encounters the officer's wife again, and he returns her glare from earlier as she tries to pick up a corpse. As they oversee the work, Nixon reveals to the company that Adolf Hitler has killed himself.

The episode concludes with a card discussing the six million Jews and five million ethnic minorities killed in the Holocaust.

== Production ==
"We had plenty of good, important, hard fun while shooting Band of Brothers, but respectively the fun stopped while filming episode 9."

— James Madio

The title of the episode is a reference to the American wartime propaganda films of the same name.

David Frankel and John Orloff were respectively the episode's director and writer, their second work for Band of Brothers after Frankel did episode 7 ("The Breaking Point") while Orloff first worked on episode 2 ("Day of Days"). Frankel, who lost family members in the Holocaust, offered to direct it. Orloff was hesitant about covering such a dark topic, equating it to going from writing Saving Private Ryan to Schindler's List, and worried about the difficulty of accurately telling the stories of both Easy Company and the Holocaust. The Band of Brothers book by Stephen E. Ambrose, which the miniseries is based on, only covers the camp in one paragraph; the passage discusses how it is a labor camp rather than one for extermination, yet was "so horrible that it was impossible to fathom the enormity of the evil." Hoping to gain more information for the episode, Orloff attempted to contact veterans at Kaufering IV but was often refused as they were unwilling to discuss such a traumatic event. Perconte's actor James Madio was also unable to learn much about the camp from Perconte, not wanting to "trigger his emotions" unless permitted. Winters, on the other hand, shared "many, many hours" of insight with Orloff as he believed it was important to discuss the camps and counter the rise of Holocaust denial.

To cover Nixon's arc in the episode, Orloff had to use a "little more imagination" than the straightforward story beats in "Day of Days". While aware of Nixon's personal struggles like his divorce and alcoholism, he could not find enough about the real person and therefore framed Nixon as a proxy to represent the weariness that Allied troops were facing. His confrontation with the German widow was adapted from a true experience of Winters, which the latter permitted. Other creative liberties were also taken such as Perconte not being the soldier who told Winters about the camp in real life.

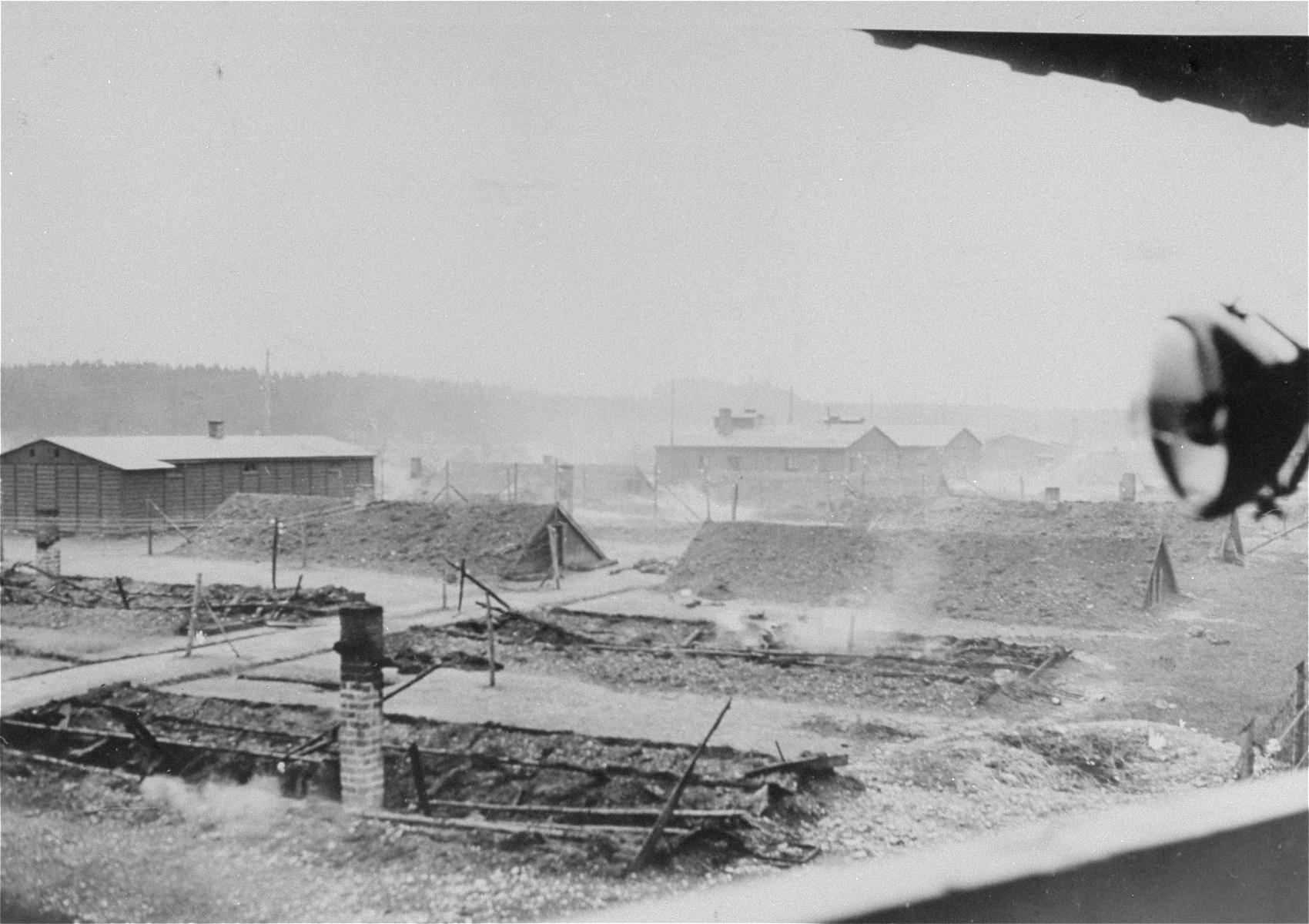
Kaufering IV on the day of discovery on April 27, 1945

Filming the camp scene took between a week to ten days with approximately 200 personnel. A replica of Kaufering IV was constructed in the English town of Hatfield, Hertfordshire. Film recorded by Allied troops was provided by historian Anton Posset and the Landsberg Citizens' Association in the 20th Century for reference in building the set. Artifacts from various museums were also procured to add to the authenticity.

The extras brought in for the camp prisoners were actors with medical issues like eating disorders or illnesses that made them appear emaciated. Animatronics and motorized mannequins made from plastic were used for the dying; for example, an elderly man being carried by his son is actually an animatronic doll controlled by wire since the only moving parts were his mouth and eyes. While assured by his staff that visual effects could feasibly depict the prisoners, Frankel opted for practical effects because he feared making them look too realistic would be unsettling for viewers. Digital editing was still used in the episode to depict the German soldiers marching by filming 300 extras then copying them several times until they reached the desired 300 thousand.

Since the episode lacks combat scenes, rehearsing differed from the rest of the show. The main actors were invited to visit the real camp ahead of filming, but they declined as they wished to naturally convey their characters' surprise at discovering the camp. Madio felt the set was so realistic that he was genuinely upset and confused as he walked through it. Ross McCall, who played Liebgott, recalled on HBO Max's Band of Brothers Podcast in 2021:

"When you see us in the show seeing it for the first time, that's us seeing it for the first time. I just was astounded at what we saw. A lot of that shock and awe and horror was real. Some guys really broke down at it. Some guys soldiered through it. I think everyone was just like, 'Wow. I mean, we're not making a movie at this point.' It was breathtakingly heartbreaking."

The camp was filmed in shaky camera form with earthy color grading, which was inspired by the 1982 film Sophie's Choice, while Ludwig van Beethoven's String Quartet No. 14 is used as the soundtrack. A string quartet playing Beethoven in the village ruins also serves as the framing device for the episode. About five minutes of the camp was removed from the final cut on request from HBO for being too disturbing.

In reality, Kaufering IV was found by the 12th Armored Division a day before the 101st. Orloff was not aware of this at the time of writing the episode, but surmised Easy Company genuinely believed they were the first to uncover the camp; still, he was forgiving of the men for the misconception because the fact they "can remember it at all is amazing". Winters stated in an interview that it was a "complete shock that just stumps every feeling of emotion that you have. The horror of it, you could never imagine something like this before."

Future award-winning actor Tom Hardy made his screen debut in "Why We Fight" as Private John A. Janovec. Janovec is depicted as a young soldier who is caught by Captain Ronald Speirs sleeping with a German woman early in the episode but is later sobered by the camp, where he is seen hugging a prisoner. While in a supporting role with few lines and ultimately appearing in just two episodes, Hardy still researched the actual person as he hoped to play him with the proper respect.

== Reception ==
"Why We Fight" has been regarded by critics as the best and "most heartbreaking" or "saddest" episode of the series. The concentration camp was a common aspect of praise for its grim depiction and how the inhumanity properly justifies the Allied cause. Orloff was likewise proud of how the transition from military heroics to such an atrocity allows the audience to share in the shock that the characters had at the camp.

The Pittsburgh Post-Gazette called the episode "one of the most memorable broadcasts in television history", praising the balance between Easy Company's reactions to the camp and following military protocol as an "infuriating and enlightening hour of television". Alex Strachan, television critic for the Vancouver Sun, lauded the episode as a "powerful visual document" that was as effect as a documentary. He wrote that although many acclaimed documentaries have covered the Holocaust, few discussed the impact it had on the soldiers who liberated the camps.

Emily St. James of The A.V. Club praised the focus on Nixon as the embodiment of the episode's message, depicting his deteriorating mental state due to the war before finding the camp. Comic Book Resources's Joshua Patton wrote the characters "earned the reverence they get" for their evolving empathy throughout the episode, going from looting for personal gain to doing so to help others in need.

The New York Times writer Caryn James felt the episode was "undeniably forceful", but it came too late in the series for explaining Easy Company's motive to fight.

McCall's portrayal of Liebgott, an ordinarily hot-headed soldier who becomes quiet and pained by the camp, garnered positive comments. Alan Sepinwall of The Star-Ledger wrote that "McCall isn't mentioned often among the best performances of this series, but he owns those two moments" of speaking with the prisoner and ordering them back into the camp. Although accounts of Liebgott's behavior at the camp describe him as being orderly and disciplined, McCall wanted the "human element" to come out and thus acted more emotionally. He also commended the actor who played the prisoner speaking to him in German, saying the conversation "killed me".

In recognition of their work on the episode, makeup artists Elizabeth Tagg and Nikita Rae were nominated for the Primetime Emmy Award in Outstanding Non-Prosthetic Makeup in a Miniseries, Movie, or Special. The Mists of Avalon's pilot episode won the award. Tagg described Band of Brothers as among her favorite projects for its "extraordinary production that set a benchmark for storytelling, authenticity and attention to detail, and being part of that was a real career highlight."

== Legacy ==
The episode has been cited as a vital learning material about the Holocaust. Tour guides at the United States Holocaust Memorial Museum mentioned to Orloff that Band of Brothers is the most common answer by visitors when asked where they first heard of the genocide. McCall has also spoken with veterans and educators about the episode:

"It's one of the most talked-about episodes of television history. I have teachers and scholars and professors write to me saying, 'I show this episode in my class.' I have kids write to me, saying, 'I didn't know about this. I love the show, but this episode in particular.' To be involved and to be able to tell that story in a way that has affected people in the way it has, I'm hugely honored. Whether that's me being a vessel as an actor or as a human being, however that comes along, that I got to be able to get some of that education out to this generation, I'm completely floored by, grateful for."

The opening scene was brought up by defense analyst Russell W. Glenn in 2023 to discuss the urban destruction caused by World War II and subsequent recovery, writing that "thousands upon thousands replicated the tasks highlighted in Band of Brothers" like clearing bricks from destroyed buildings and disposing debris.

Webster's outburst at the German horse-drawn convoy forms the introduction to Sinclair Davidson's review of Adam Tooze's book The Wages of Destruction: The Making and Breaking of the Nazi Economy that seeks to explain Germany's logistical problems that culminated in their final state. The character's proclamation to "say hello to Ford and General fucking Motors!" was used by News & Messenger writer Dan Verner in 2009 in discussing the manufacturers' importance to American culture as they grappled with the 2008–2010 automotive industry crisis. Scott Mooneyham also employed the quote amid the broader 2008 financial crisis to describe public anger toward Wachovia and president G. Kennedy Thompson.

== See also ==
- The Holocaust in the arts and popular culture
