= Zec (surname) =

Zec (Serbian: Зец) is a Serbian and Bosnian surname, borne by ethnic Serbs and Bosniaks in Bosnia and Herzegovina and Serbia. The word "zec" means rabbit. It may refer to:

- Asim Zec (born 1994), Bosnian footballer
- Darko Zec (born 1989), Slovenian footballer
- David Zec (born 2000), Slovenian footballer
- Donald Zec (1919–2021), British journalist
- Đuro Zec (born 1990), Serbian footballer
- Ermin Zec (born 1988), Bosnian footballer
- Gojko Zec (1935–1995), Serbian football manager
- Josie Zec (born 2000), American singer
- Maša Zec Peškirič (born 1987), Slovenian tennis player
- Miodrag Zec (born 1982), Montenegrin footballer
- Nino Zec (born 1949), Serbian footballer
- Peter Zec (born 1956), German design consultant
- Philip Zec (1909–1983), British political cartoonist and editor
- Safet Zec (born 1943), Bosnian painter
- Family of Mihajlo, Marija and Aleksandra Zec, Croatian Serb 1991 murder victims
