= Emil Breslaur =

German pianist and composer

Emil Breslaur (29 May 1836 – 26 July 1899) was a German pianist and composer.

== Life ==
Born in Cottbus, Breslaur attended the Gymnasium in his hometown and the teachers' seminary in Neuzelle. He then became a preacher and religious teacher in the Jewish community in Cottbus. In 1863, he went to Berlin and studied there for four years at the Stern Conservatory, where he was particularly concerned with the pedagogical side of piano teaching. His teachers were Jean Vogt and Heinrich Ehrlich (piano), Flodoard Geyer and Friedrich Kiel (composition), Hugo Schwantzer (organ) and Julius Stern (score reading and conducting). From 1868 to 1879, Breslaur worked as a teacher at Theodor Kullak's New Academy of Music. In 1878, he founded the journal Der Klavier-Lehrer, which he edited until his death; in 1883, he became choirmaster of the Reformed Synagogue in Berlin. He founded a circle of music teachers from which the Deutscher Musiklehrer-Verband emerged in 1886.

In addition to his teaching and composing activities, Breslaur also wrote music criticism and published several books. Of particular value are his publications on the methodology of piano teaching. These include his Piano School op. 41, which he also sent to Clara Schumann in 1889.

Breslaur died in Berlin at the age of 63.

== Publications ==
- Zur methodischen Uebung des Klavierspiels (Osterprogramm der Neuen Akademie der Tonkunst, Beilage), Berlin: Krause, 1871
- Methodik des Klavier-Unterrichts in Einzelaufsätzen. Für Lehrer und Lernende. Mit vielen Abbildungen und erläuternden Notenbeispielen, Berlin: N. Simrock, 1886
- Sind originale Synagogen- und Volks-Melodien bei den Juden geschichtlich nachweisbar? Vortrag gehalten im Verein für jüdische Geschichte und Litteratur in Berlin, Leipzig: Breitkopf & Härtel, 1898
