= Kaufering (disambiguation) =

Kaufering may refer to:

- Kaufering, Bavaria
- Kaufering concentration camp complex, Nazi concentration camps located near the town
- Kaufering station
