= Kaufering concentration camp complex =

Subcamps of the Dachau concentration camp during World War II

Kaufering I–XI
- concentration camps
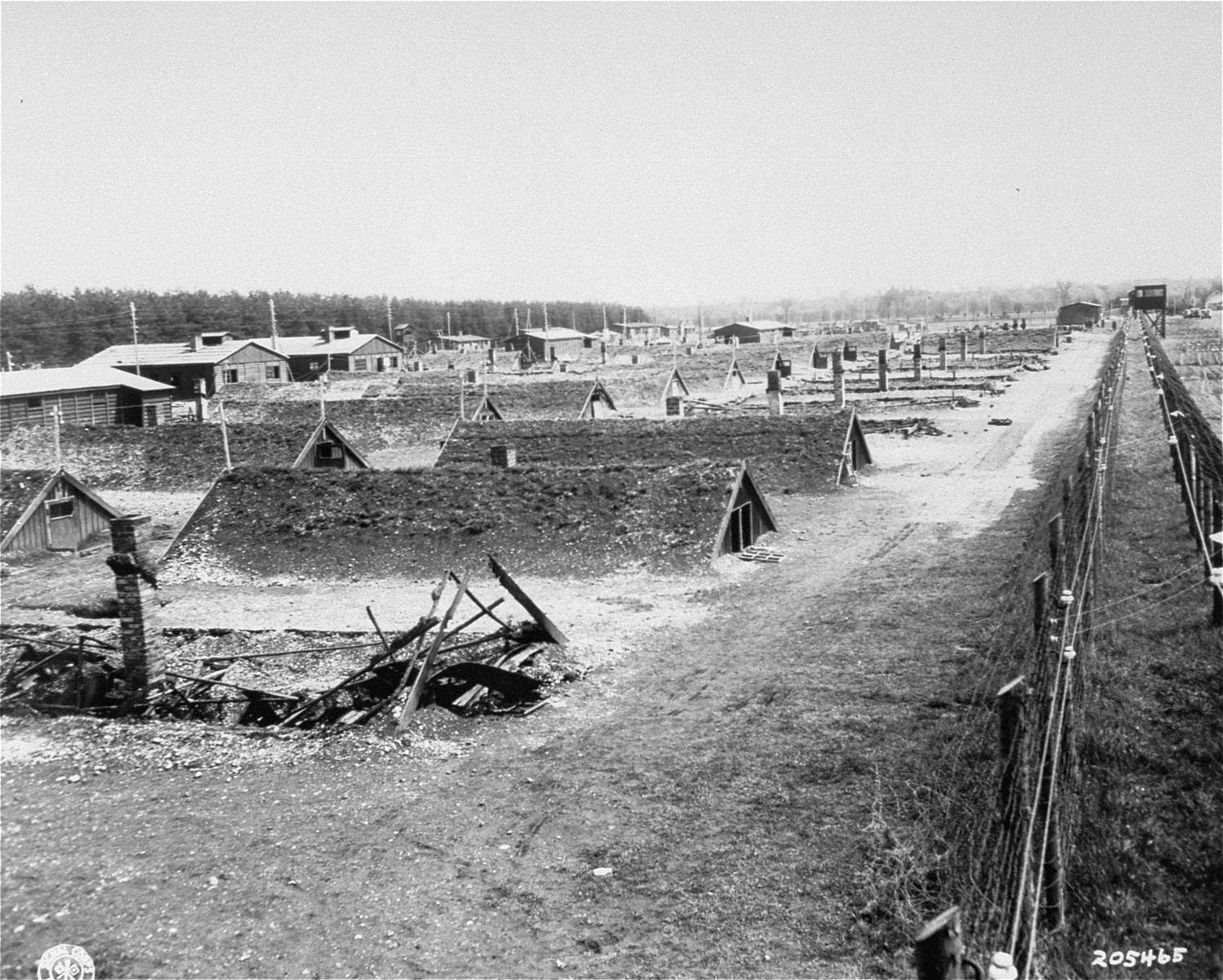
- Kaufering IV after liberation
- Location: Landsberg am Lech, Bavaria
- Operated by: Nazi Germany
- Commandant: Heinrich Forster; Hans Aumeier; Otto Förschner
- Companies involved: Messerschmitt AG
- Operational: 18 June 1944 – 27 April 1945
- Inmates: Mostly Jews
- Number of inmates: 30,000
- Killed: 15,000
- Liberated by: Seventh United States Army
- Notable inmates: Elkhanan Elkes; Viktor Frankl
- Website: www.landsberger-zeitgeschichte.de/English/Memorial.htm

Kaufering (German pronunciation: [ˈkaʊfəʁɪŋ]) was a system of eleven subcamps of the Dachau concentration camp which operated between 18 June 1944 and 27 April 1945 and which were located around the towns of Landsberg am Lech and Kaufering in Bavaria.

Previously, Nazi Germany had deported all Jews from the Reich, but having exhausted other sources of labor, Jews were deported to Kaufering to create three massive underground bunkers, Weingut II, Diana II, and Walnuss II, which would not be vulnerable to the Allied bombing which had devastated German aircraft factories. The bunkers were intended for the production of Messerschmitt Me 262 aircraft, but none were produced at the camps before the United States Army captured the area.

Kaufering was the largest of the Dachau subcamps and also the one with the worst conditions; about half of the 30,000 prisoners died from hunger, disease, executions, or during the death marches. Most of the sites were not preserved and have been repurposed for other uses.

== Establishment ==
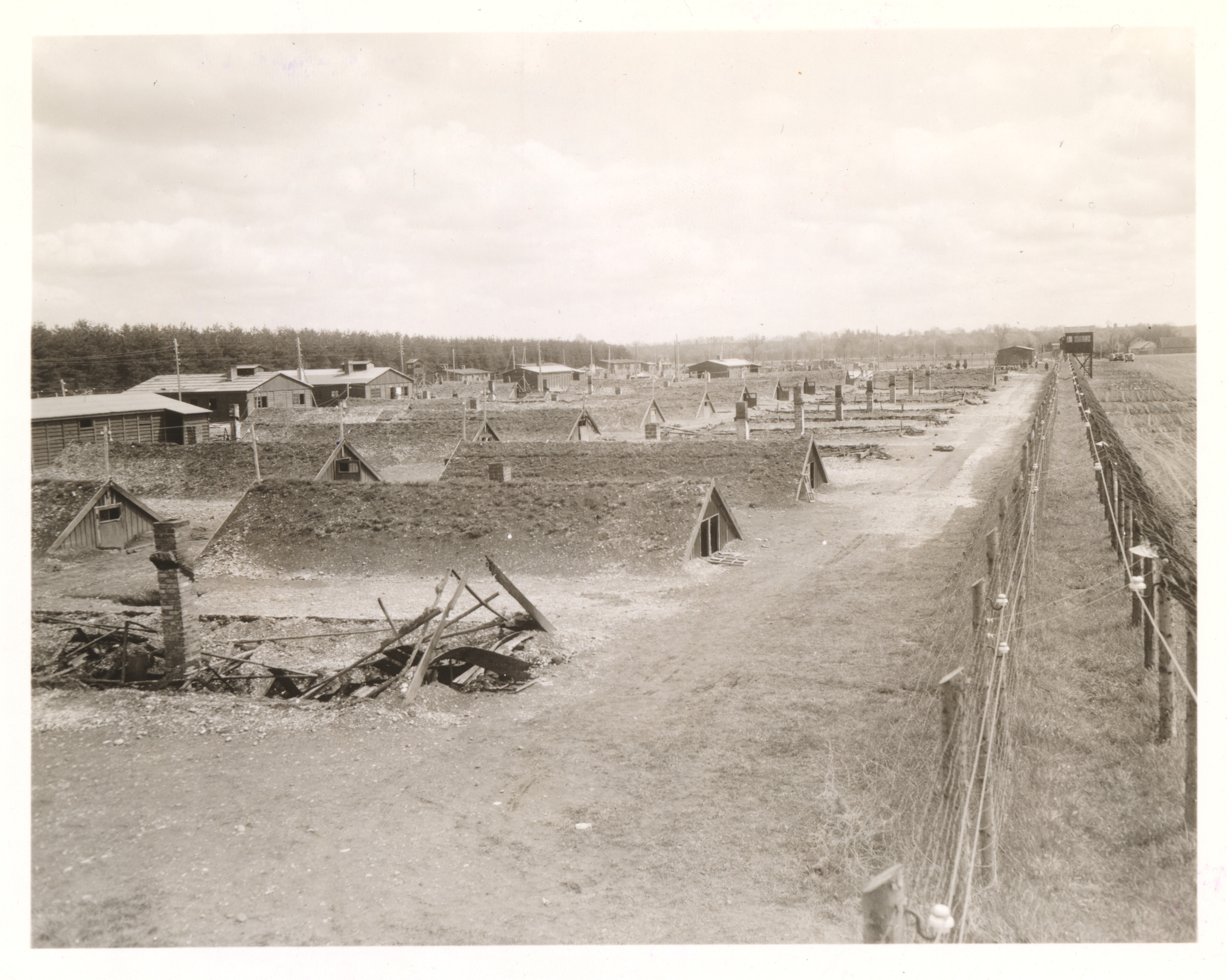
Kaufering IV, subcamp of Dachau KZ, 29 April 1945. 111-SC 204565, Credit NARA.

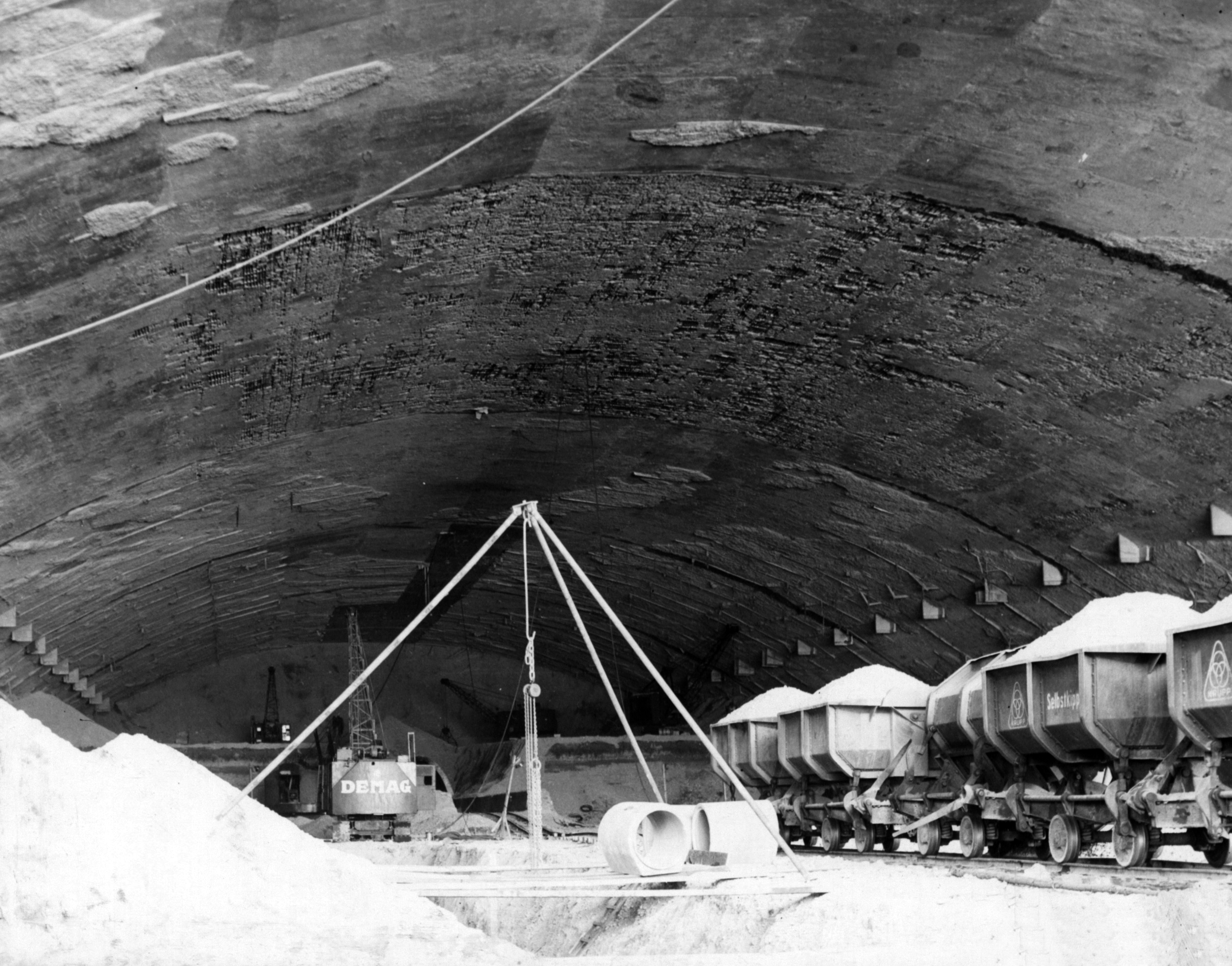
Internal view of Weingut I, the bunker at Mühldorf

In early 1944, Allied bombing raids had reduced the fighter aircraft production of German factories by as much as two-thirds. In order to reduce the effectiveness of Allied bombing, the Jägerstab, a task force of the Reich Ministry of Armaments and War Production for increasing fighter production, planned to move production underground. Existing underground areas, such as caves and mines, were not suited to factory production, so new concrete bunkers were to be built, using concentration camp prisoners for labor. The area around Landsberg am Lech in Bavaria, where the Kaufering subcamps were established, was selected for this project due to its favorable geology; there was a layer of gravel up to 10 metres (33 ft) thick, and the water table was below 13 metres (43 ft). Out of six planned bunkers, three began construction at Kaufering and another at nearby Mühldorf concentration camp.

Previously, Nazi Germany had attempted to make the Reich Judenrein ("cleansed of Jews") by deporting all Jews to eastern areas. However, they had exhausted other sources of forced labor, so Jews were deported to the Reich to work on the new project. Kaufering I, later redesignated Kaufering III, was established by a transport of 1,000 Hungarian Jewish men from Auschwitz concentration camp that arrived in Kaufering, Bavaria, on 18 June 1944. Prisoner functionaries were brought from Dachau to manage the new camp.

== Forced labor ==
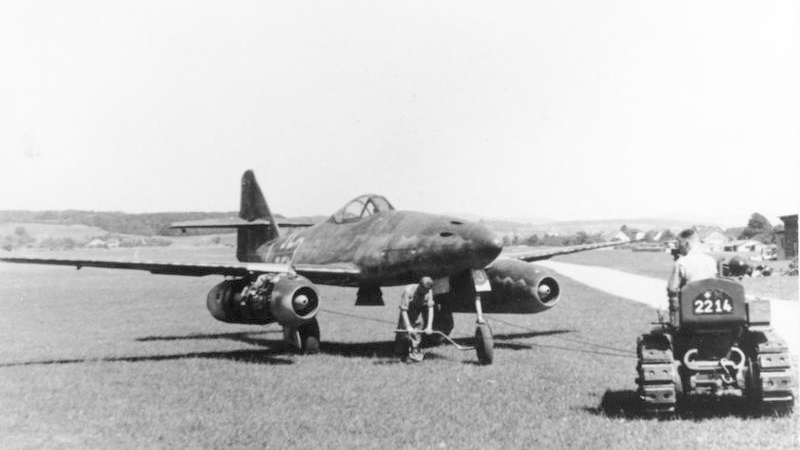
The purpose of the camp was to produce Messerschmitt Me 262A aircraft.

Unusually, the construction of the camps, as well as providing food and medical care, was the responsibility of the Organization Todt (OT), not the SS, which sought to extract the maximum labor for the minimum expense. The prisoners deported to each camp had to construct the accommodation themselves. The resulting huts, partially buried for camouflage from aerial reconnaissance, were completely inadequate for the weather conditions. Rain and snow leaked through the earthen roofs, and vermin infested the huts. Prisoners had to sleep in straw spread on the floor. Of Dachau's subcamps, Kaufering had the worst conditions.

Most prisoners were forced to work building railway embankments and hauling bags of cement for the bunker-building projects, codenamed Weingut II, Diana II and Walnuss II. Weingut II was 400 metres (1,300 ft) long and 28.4 metres (93 ft) high (more than five stories), with a concrete roof 3 metres (9.8 ft) thick. The roof had been planned to be 5 metres (16 ft) thick, but that was pared down due to lack of materials. The total floor area would be 95,000 square metres (1,020,000 sq ft); the Augsburg factory that it intended to replace had only 12,700 square metres (137,000 sq ft) of floor area in three dispersal locations. For protection from air raids, 40% of the bunker was underground and its roof was covered with dirt for camouflage. At least 10,000 Jewish prisoners worked on the bunker at some point.

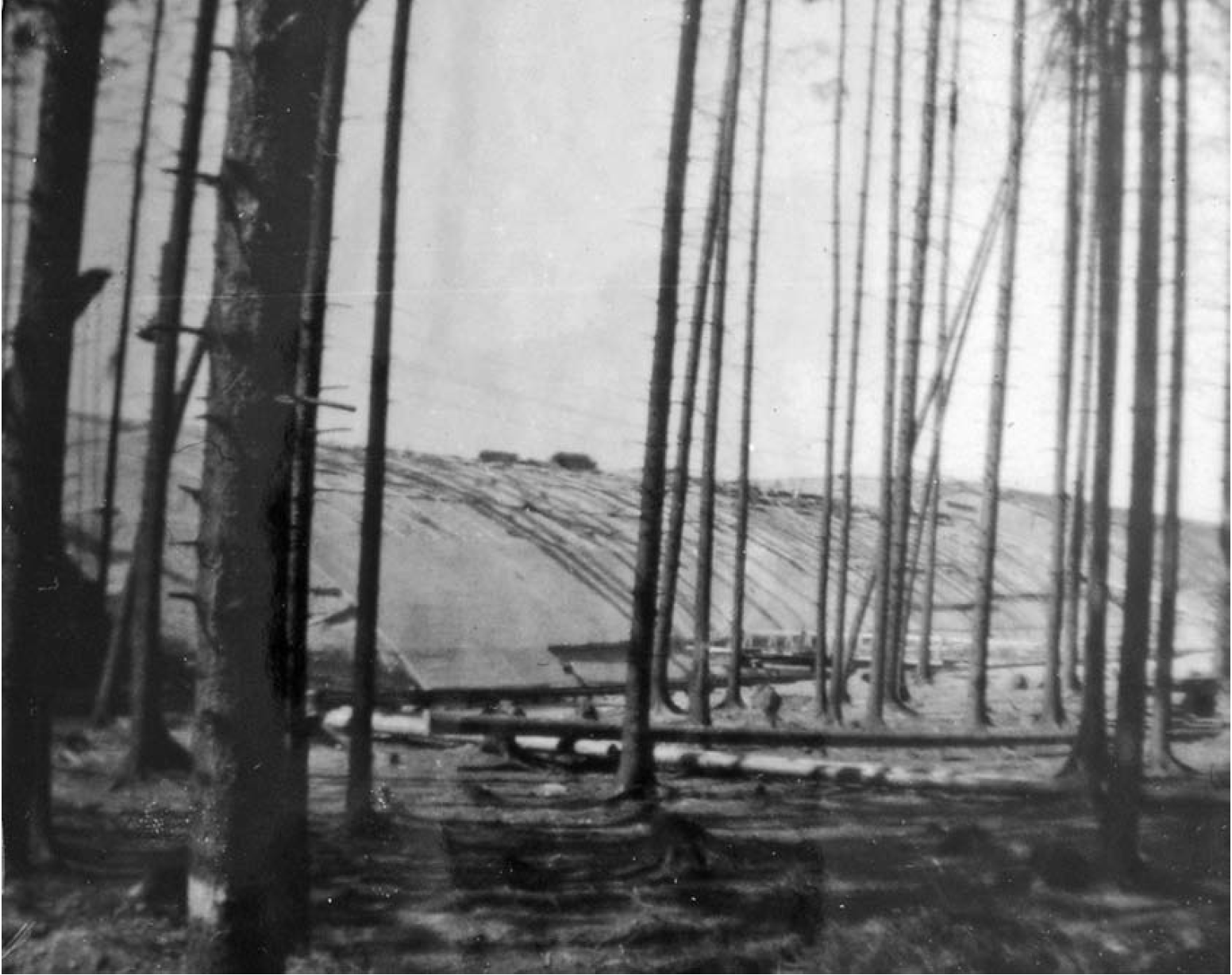
External view of the Weingut II bunker

The bunkers were to be used for producing different components of the Messerschmitt Me 262A aircraft, the first operational jet aircraft, which the Germans hoped would turn the tide of war against the Allies. Messerschmitt AG hoped to produce 900 Me 262 aircraft and additional Me 163B rocket-powered aircraft at Kaufering, by employing 10,000 workers per shift in each bunker, 90,000 in all, of whom one-third were to be concentration camp prisoners. However, the construction of Diana II and Walnuss II was not finished due to the lack of concrete and steel. When the United States liberated the area in April 1945, the excavation of Weingut II was not complete, but already production machines had been set up. However, not a single aircraft was produced before liberation.

The murderous conditions meant that most prisoners were incapacitated in a short time, and OT and construction workers brutally beat victims in order to extract labor. Most prisoners were forced to work building railway embankments and hauling bags of cement for the bunker-building projects. OT workers complained that, due to severe vermin infestation, prisoners spent time attempting to rid themselves of fleas when they were supposed to be working. In December 1944, an OT staff member observed that of 17,600 prisoners, only 8,319 were capable of work, including those only capable of light work. Because the companies that hired the workers complained that they had to pay for the labor of prisoners unable to work, transports totaling 1,322 or 1,451 people were dispatched to Auschwitz in September and October 1944, where the victims were gassed.

== Command and organization ==
The SS hierarchy at Kaufering had mostly served at eastern death camps, such as Majdanek and Auschwitz, which had been liberated by the Red Army. The first commandant, Heinrich Forster, had previously worked at Sachsenhausen, Dachau, and Kovno concentration camps. Forster was replaced in December 1944 by Hans Aumeier, former deputy commandant of Auschwitz and commandant of Vaivara concentration camp. In February 1945, Otto Förschner, former commandant of Mittelbau-Dora, took over command of Kaufering. The camp doctor was Max Blancke, who had worked at multiple concentration camps. Architect Hermann Giesler, a close associate of Adolf Hitler, was in charge of the bunker construction.

Consisting of eleven subcamps, Kaufering was the largest of the Dachau subcamp systems, and probably the largest Jewish subcamp system in the Reich.

=== List of Kaufering subcamps ===
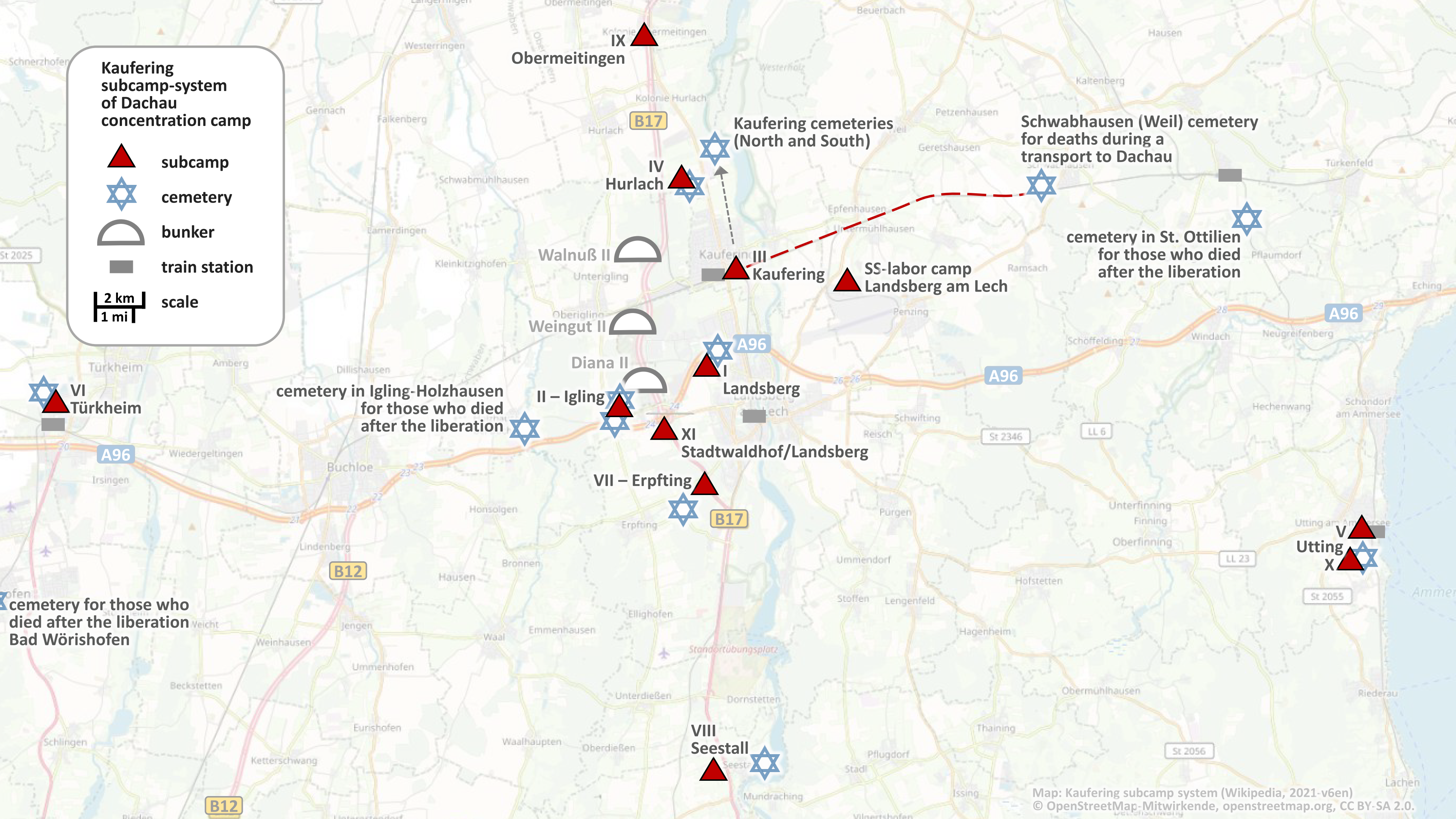
Map of all camps in the Kaufering subcamp system

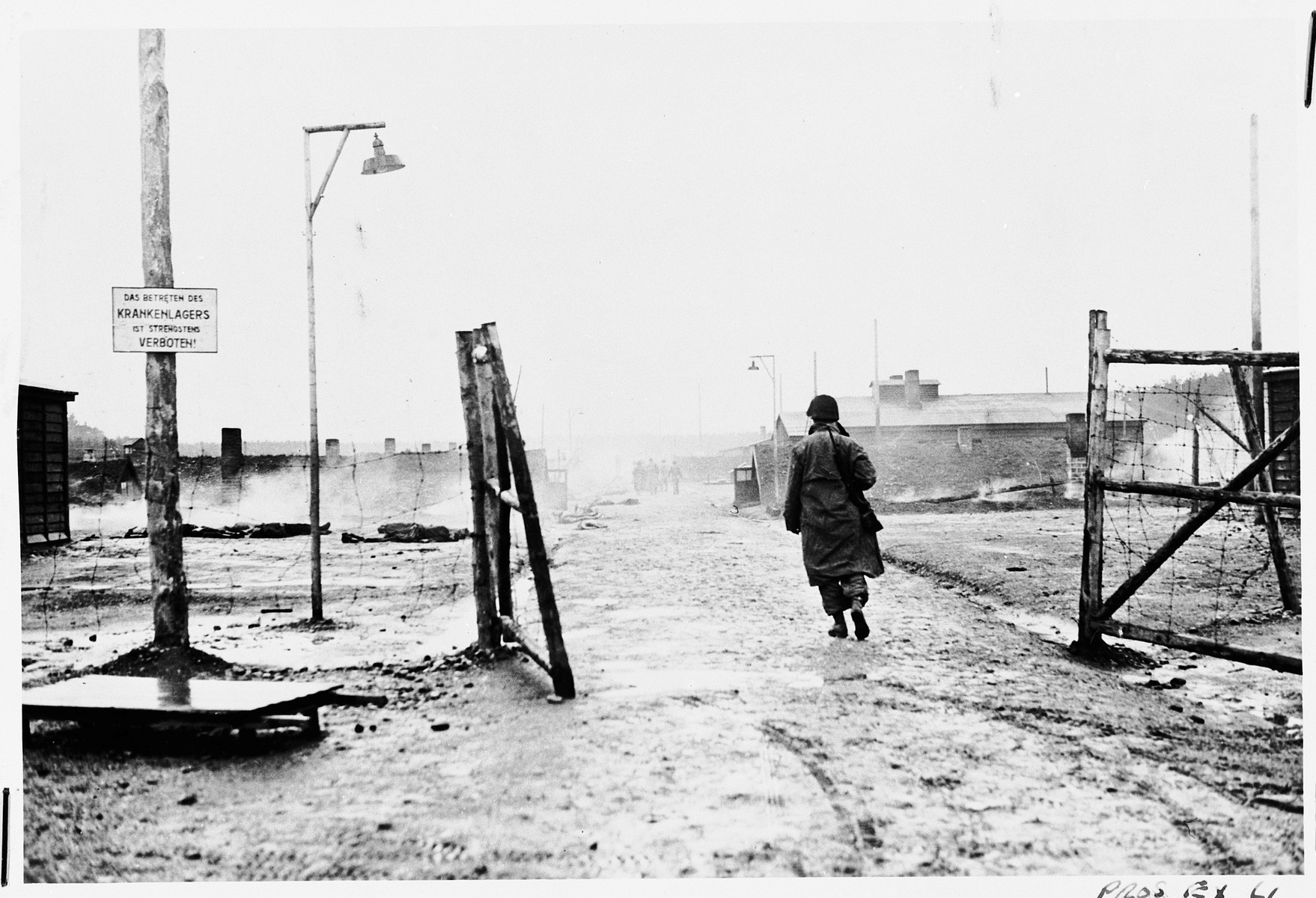
Gate of Kaufering I with American soldier

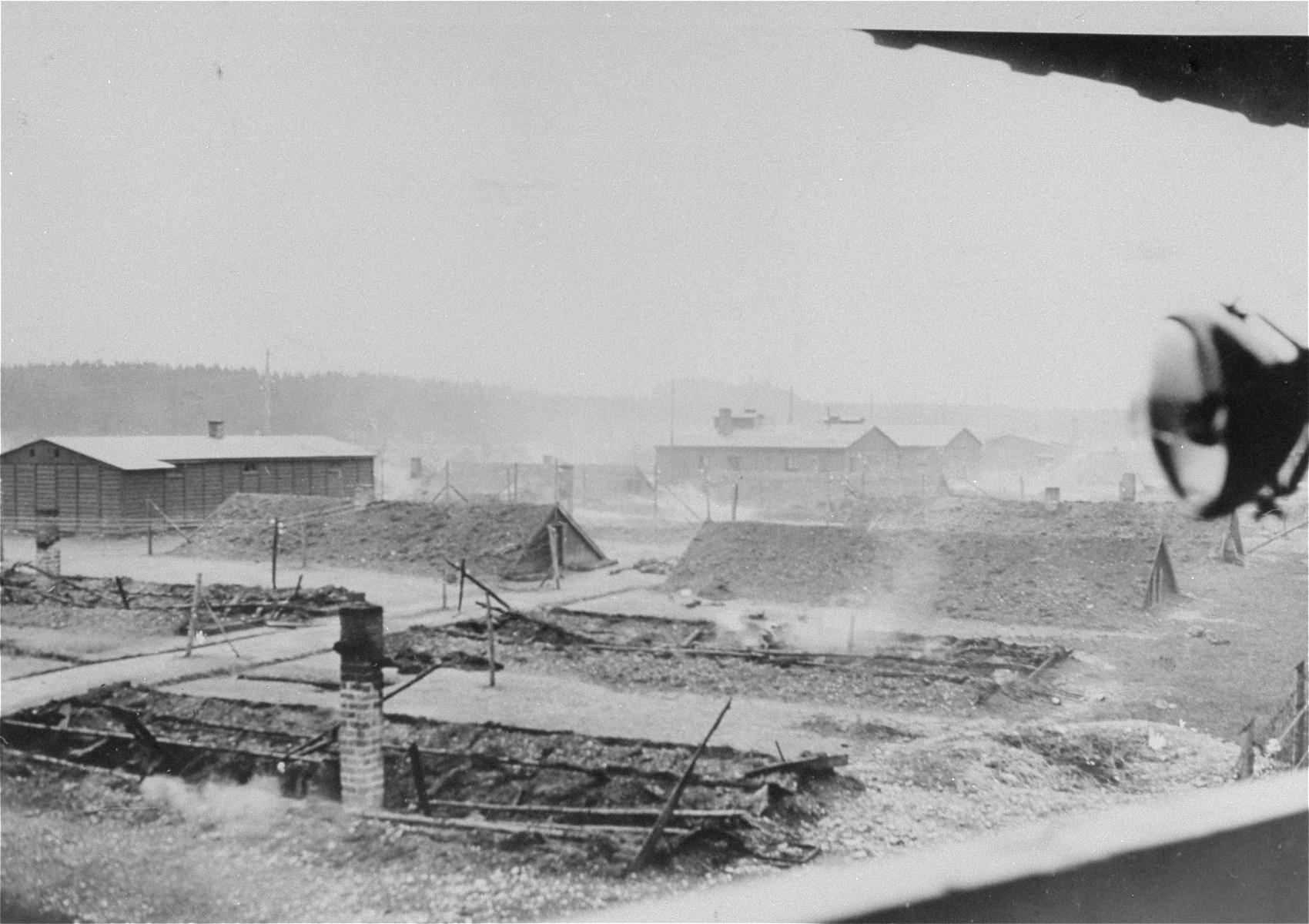
Kaufering IV on the day of liberation

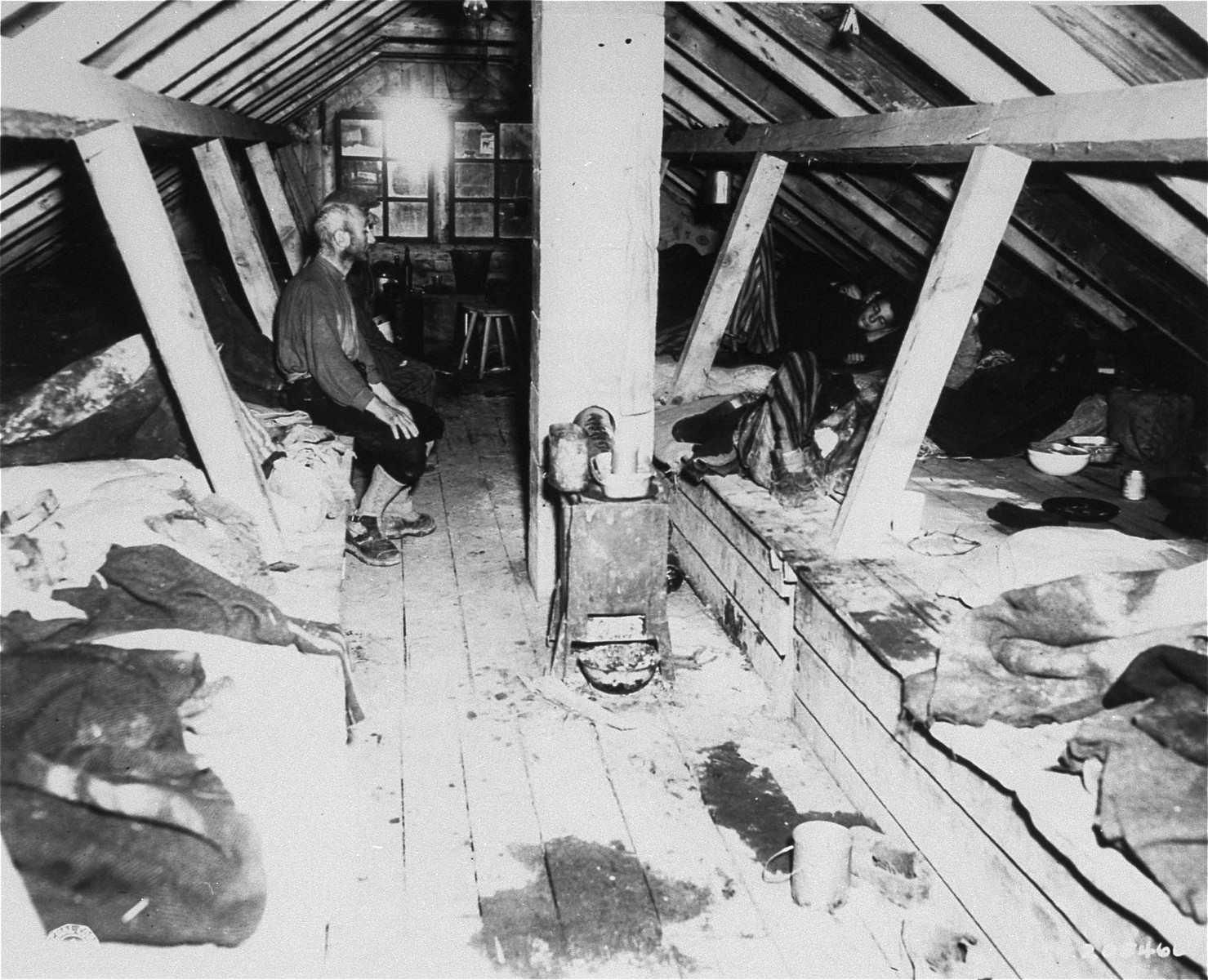
Inside an earth hut, where they had to sleep. This one at Kaufering IV – Hurlach

Overview – Kaufering concentration camp complex
Eleven subcamps	Period, scope, use, conditions, specials	Place address
Kaufering I – Landsberg SS headquarter camp complex Kaufering I–XI	(before late September, designated Kaufering III) was opened on 22 June 1944 and served as the headquarters of the Kaufering command from September. Located near Landsberg am Lech, the main purpose of this camp was the construction of bunker Weingut II. Between 2000 and 5000 men lived there; in February 1945, 200 women also arrived there. Because of overcrowding, Kaufering XI was established and some prisoners moved. A group of seven Hungarian Jewish women, known as the "Schwangerenkommando" (pregnancy unit), who had conceived before their deportation to Auschwitz, was allowed to remain alive and bear their children.	Landsberg am Lech nahe Iglinger Straße; 48.0602537°N 10.8521559°E
Kaufering II – Igling	Established on 24 August. Its prisoners, about 1200 men and women, mostly worked at the "Diana II" construction site. The camp existed at two locations, a summer camp built with plywood and a later camp, occupied during the winter months, which offered slightly better protection against the winter weather.	Igling; 48.0499468°N 10.8229218°E
Kaufering III – Kaufering (first "I", later "III")	(designated Kaufering I until September) was the original Kaufering camp, located near Kaufering and established by 1000 Hungarian Jewish men from Auschwitz on 18 June. These prisoners were forced to build their own accommodation. Later, prisoners were forced to work on the Weingut II bunker as well as the construction of Kaufering I and II. It served as the SS headquarters of the Kaufering complex until this was moved to Kaufering I in September 1944. The average population was 2000 men and 339 women. The senior prisoner was Victor Nečas, an Austrian political prisoner who communicated with the prisoners mostly in Hungarian.	Kaufering; 48.0816065°N 10.8639754°E
Kaufering IV – Hurlach	[de, he, pl], located between Kaufering and Hurlach, was established in September 1944 for 500 prisoners; the population later grew to 3000. Prisoners were forced to work at the Lagerlechfeld airfield, in road construction, and on the bunker Walnuss II until Kaufering IV was converted into a "sick camp", where prisoners were sent to die after they could no longer work. A typhus epidemic broke out, and Dr. Blancke and the SS guards would not enter the barracks to avoid infection. Prisoner doctors could do little, as they had no medicine or equipment. The Kaufering IV camp was liberated by the American Army in April 1945, when the SS began to prepare the surviving prisoners for the death march towards KL Dachau. A few days before the liberation, the SS crew killed hundreds of sick, wounded and incapacitated prisoners, which brought the number of soldiers who survived the camp to several hundred. It is estimated that there were 3,000 prisoners in the camp.	Kolonie Hurlach 48.1031890°N 10.8442252°E
Kaufering V – Utting	Near Utting, has an unclear history due to inconsistent testimony from survivors. It is possible that it was only a subarea of Kaufering X, such as the kitchen, rather than a separate subcamp.	Utting am Ammersee Gegend; 48.019612°N 11.089130°E
Kaufering VI – Türkheim	[de] Was established in October 1944 at Türkheim, and housed between 1000 and 2500 prisoners, who were forced to work clearing nearby forests, in agriculture, and in construction. Many of the prisoners were later transported to other Kaufering subcamps to work on the bunkers.	Türkheim 48.050705°N 10.617181°E
Kaufering VII – Erpfting	Was established on 11 November 1944 near the offices of Held & Francke. Between 2000 and 3000 men and 118 to 272 women were forced to live in huts and clay bunkers and work on prefabricated parts for "Diana II". After a typhus epidemic, sick prisoners were taken to Kaufering IV.	Erpfting 48.0299958°N 10.8524659°E
Kaufering VIII – Seestall	At Seestall, was likely established as a mistake on the Germans' part, because the local soil was not suitable for the construction of bunkers. It was smaller than the other camps, and prisoners were forced to work on agriculture and gravel extraction.	Fuchstal/Seestall 47.963659°N 10.855357°E
Kaufering IX – Obermeitingen	Was a men's camp that existed from 14 October 1944 in Obermeitingen. Its prisoners were forced to work on Walnuss II.	Obermeitingen 48.13727°N 10.82991°E
Kaufering X – Utting	Established on Holzhauser Street in Utting on 26 September, housed 200 to 400 men forced to produce prefabricated components for the Dyckerhoff & Widmann firm. Because the prisoners worked indoors, their chances of survival were higher than at other subcamps.	Utting am Ammersee 48.01486°N 11.08730°E
Kaufering XI – Stadtwaldhof/Landsberg	From late October, was established on Mühlweg Street in Landsberg to house surplus prisoners from Kaufering I. It consisted of barracks, clay bunkers, earthen huts, and a delousing center.	Landsberg am Lech 48.042590°N 10.837118°E

== Prisoners ==
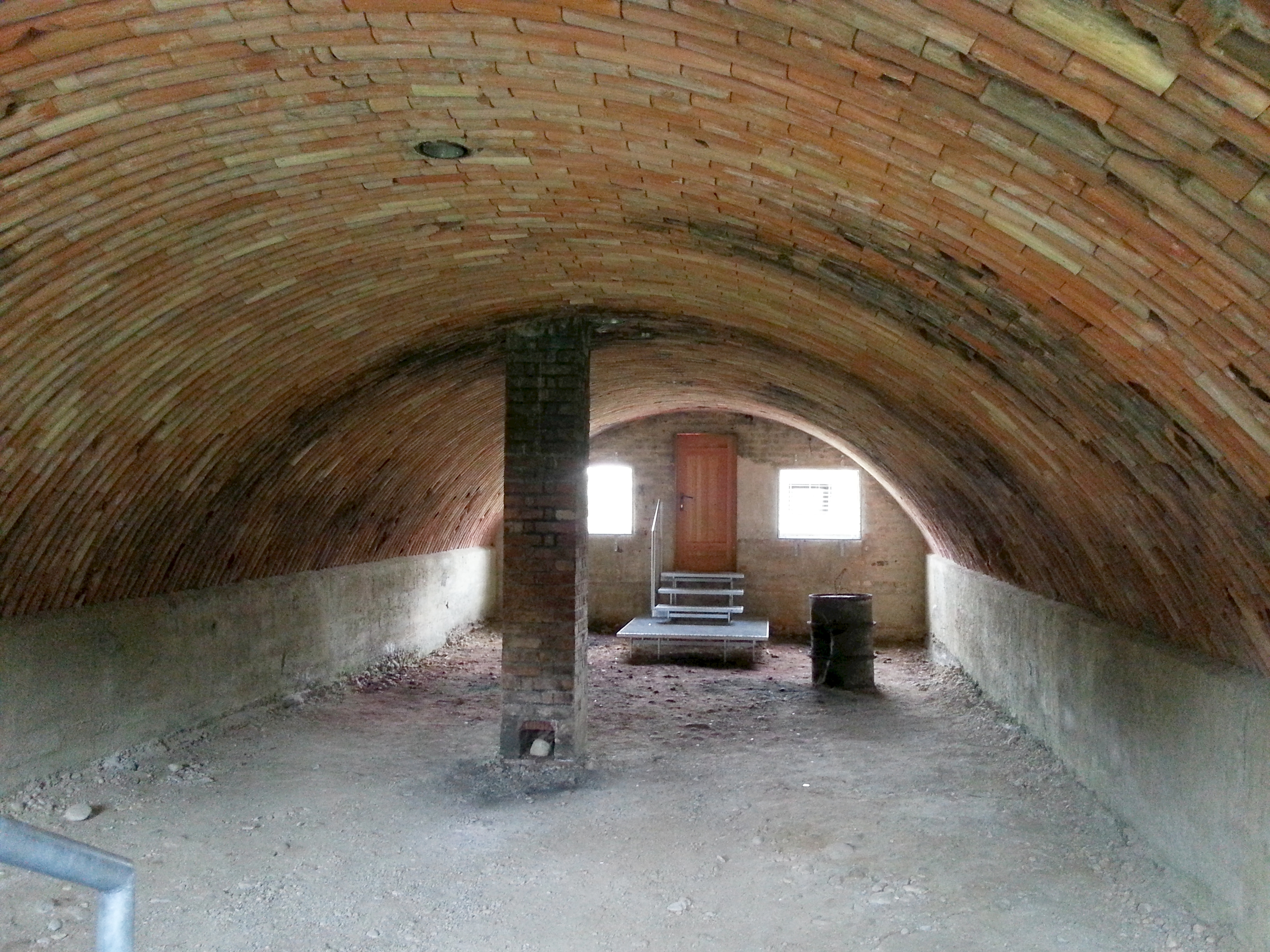
Barracks at Kaufering VII

About 30,000 prisoners passed through the Kaufering camps, including 4,200 women and 850 children. This dwarfed the population of the surrounding area; only 10,000 people lived in the Landsberg area. Almost all of the prisoners were Jews. The majority of the prisoners came from Hungary or the areas annexed by Hungary. Eight thousand Jews were forced to leave the Kovno Ghetto in July 1944, as the Red Army approached; male prisoners were separated from the women and sent to Kaufering. Additional Jews arrived at Kaufering that summer during the liquidation of labor camps in the Baltics about to be overrun by the Red Army. These Jews had already survived countless "Aktions" in which victims were taken away to be murdered, and three years of forced labor, as well as long transports in cattle cars. Other Kaufering prisoners had survived four years in the Łódź Ghetto and a selection at Auschwitz. On 10 October 1944, a transport of Jewish men who had been imprisoned at the Theresienstadt Ghetto in the Protectorate of Bohemia and Moravia arrived via Auschwitz. Other Jewish prisoners were from the Netherlands, France, Italy, or Rhodes.

Some of the food allotted to prisoners was diverted by SS guards, further reducing the nutrient intake of prisoners. Those who were sick, with diseases such as typhus, spotted fever, and tuberculosis that were widespread in the camp, were fed even less, and rations were further reduced as the war drew to an end and shortages arose. Conditions were too harsh for a resistance movement to develop. However, survivors of the Kovno Ghetto continued to publish a clandestine newspaper, Nitsots (Spark), handwritten and illegally distributed. Elkhanan Elkes, head of the Judenrat at Kovno, was the camp elder of Kaufering I, where he died.

And – the attrition was very very high. And – but there the bodies weren't burned. They were taken to a site in mass graves, huge mass graves. I don't think they have ever been found. I wouldn't be able to find outside Kaufering. And huge mass graves. It's not very far from the Landberg prison [...] And – it was so bad – that – we had a lot of suicides there. People were going into the electric wires. And I remember, that's the only time I ever saw cannibalism. There was so little food in '45 there out – in January, February, in March...

— William J. Lowenberg, Interview, January 28th, 1993 (see video below)

Interview William Lowenberg 1993, Kaufering subcamp system of Dachau concentration camp, about earth huts, bunkers, mass graves, suicides, hunger, cold, mistreatment, forced prostitution, death march.

A commission established after the war estimated that 14,500 Kaufering prisoners had died. German historian Edith Raim wrote that about half of the 30,000 prisoners died before liberation. The main causes of death were hunger, disease, execution, deportation to Auschwitz, and the death marches. According to American historian Daniel Blatman, about 4,300 of those victims died at Kaufering itself; additional victims were sent to Dachau after becoming unable to work, or were killed during the death marches.

== Death marches ==
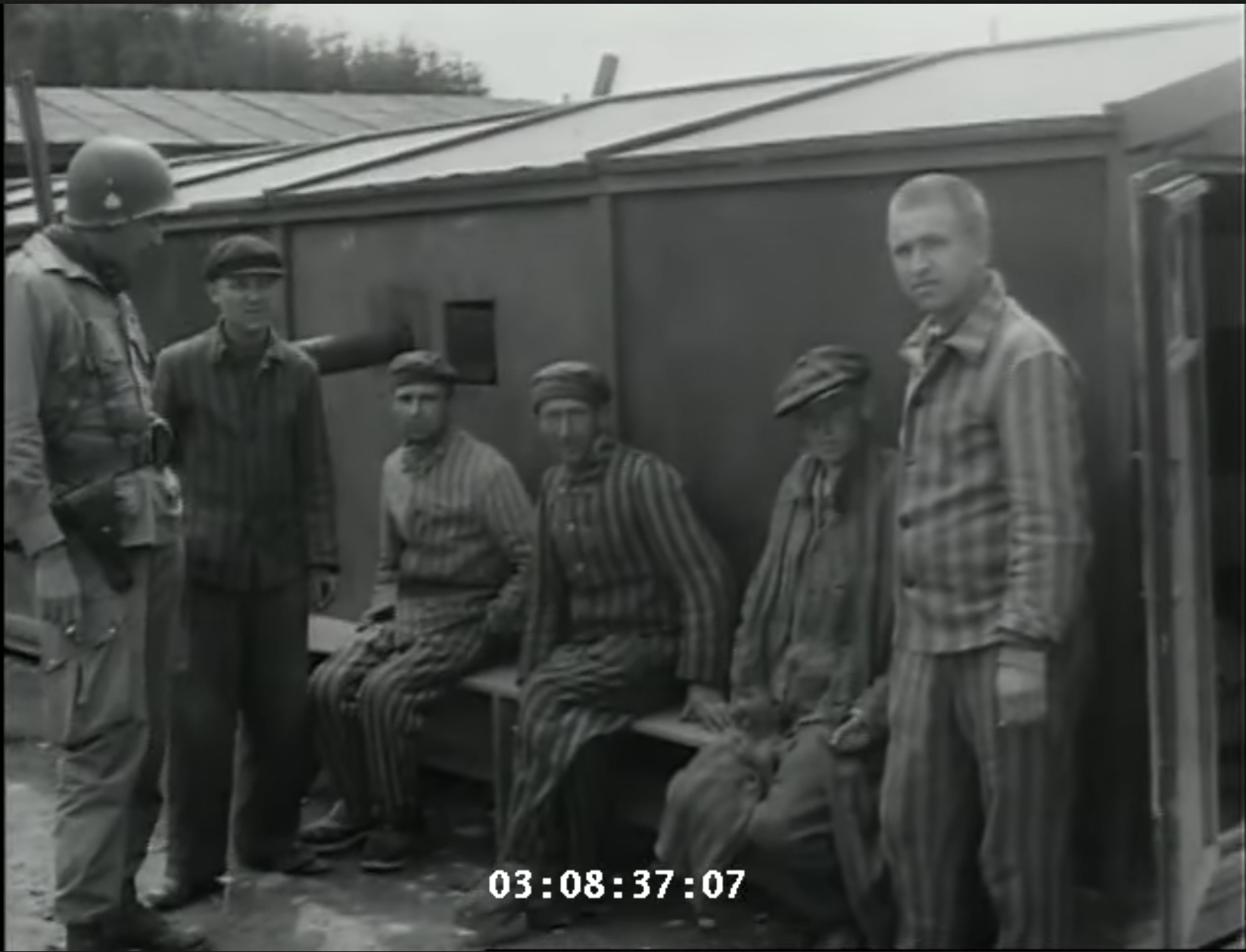
Survivors liberated at Kaufering I

As Allied troops approached, rumors circulated among the prisoners that the Germans were going to massacre them before liberation. In mid-April, SS general Ernst Kaltenbrunner relayed orders from Adolf Hitler for the Luftwaffe to bomb Dachau, Landsberg, and Mühldorf, which all had high Jewish populations. The Gauleiter of Munich, Paul Giesler, ordered Bertus Gerdes, administrator of Upper Bavaria, to prepare plans for the extermination of the surviving prisoners. Gerdes prevaricated, citing the lack of airplane fuel and ammunition as well as poor weather. In response, Kaltenbrunner ordered that the Kaufering prisoners be taken to Dachau main camp, where they were to be poisoned. Gerdes ordered a local doctor to prepare poison, but this plan could not be implemented either. The third plan was to take the prisoners to Ötz Valley in the Alps, where they were to be murdered "in one way or another".

According to German records, 10,114 prisoners, including 1,093 women, were at Kaufering camps during the last week of April. Most of them were evacuated to Dachau or locations further south, either on foot or by train. Prisoners faced a difficult choice of whether to join the death marches or to try to stay behind, knowing that they might be massacred. On the death marches, anyone who could not keep up was beaten or shot, leading to many deaths. The evacuation was disorderly, and many prisoners succeeded in escaping during the roundups at the camp or later, when the columns were attacked by American aircraft. On 23 April, 1,200 prisoners left Kaufering VI (Türkheim) on foot and joined the prisoners forced on a death march from Dachau's main camp. Another 1,500 prisoners left Kaufering the next day, proceeding at first on foot and later by train. On multiple occasions, the prisoners were attacked by Allied aircraft. In one of these attacks, which hit a train carrying ammunition as well as prisoners, hundreds of victims were killed. Some of the prisoners evacuated from Kaufering ended up at Allach concentration camp.

Hundreds of the evacuees from Kaufering arrived at Buchberg labor camp (south of Wolfratshausen) on 29 April. Otto Moll, a functionary of Kaufering, attempted to massacre these prisoners but was foiled by the camp commander. Instead Moll killed 120 or 150 Russian prisoners from Buchberg. Many of those who left Kaufering were liberated at Dachau on 28 April, but others were forced to march southwards into Upper Bavaria and were not freed until May. Kaufering IV, where those incapable of walking were held, was set on fire on the orders of the SS doctor, Max Blancke. Hundreds of sick and emaciated prisoners were trapped inside and killed. Shortly afterwards, Blancke committed suicide.

Kaufering after liberation

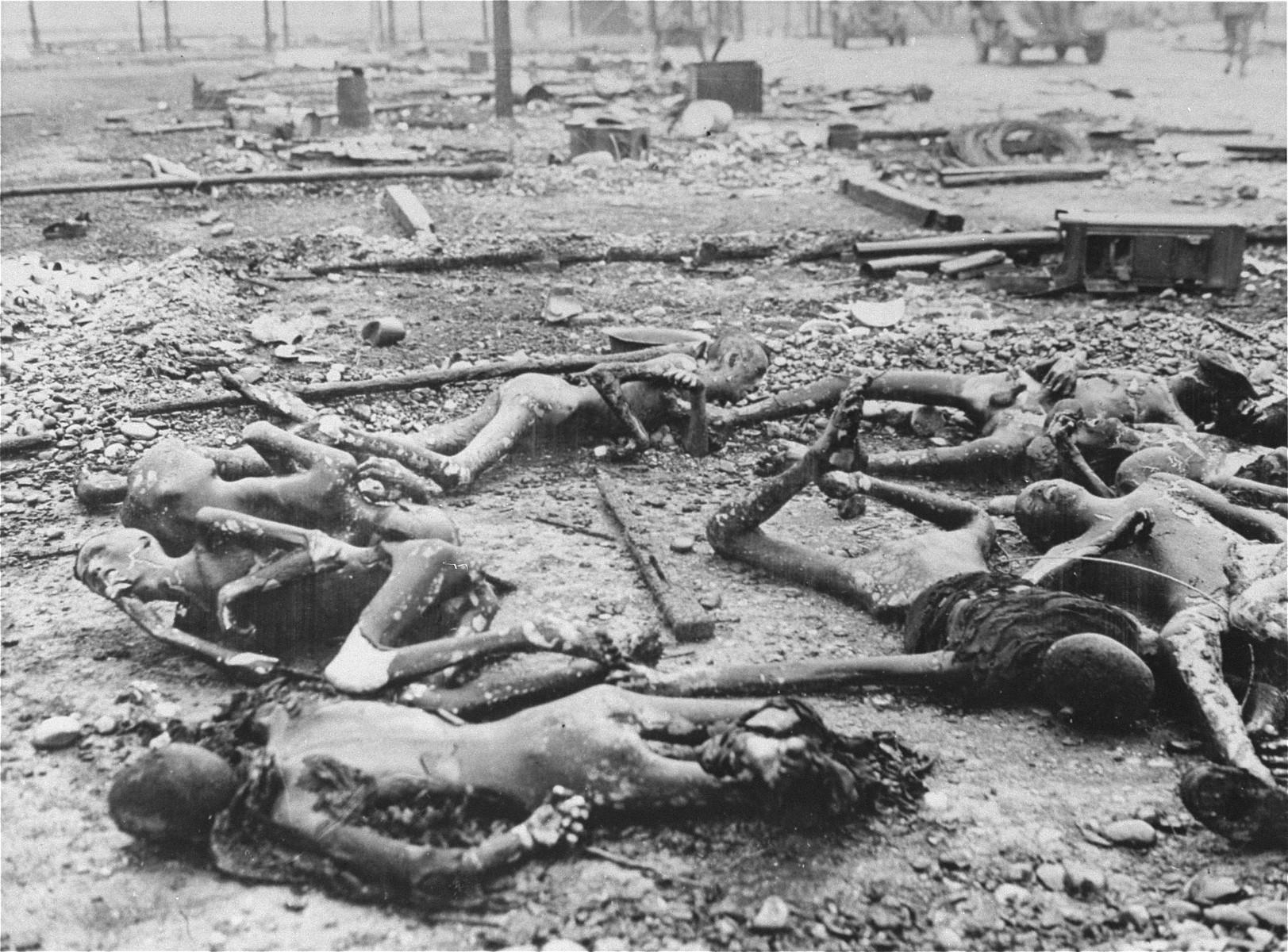
Charred corpses at Kaufering IV

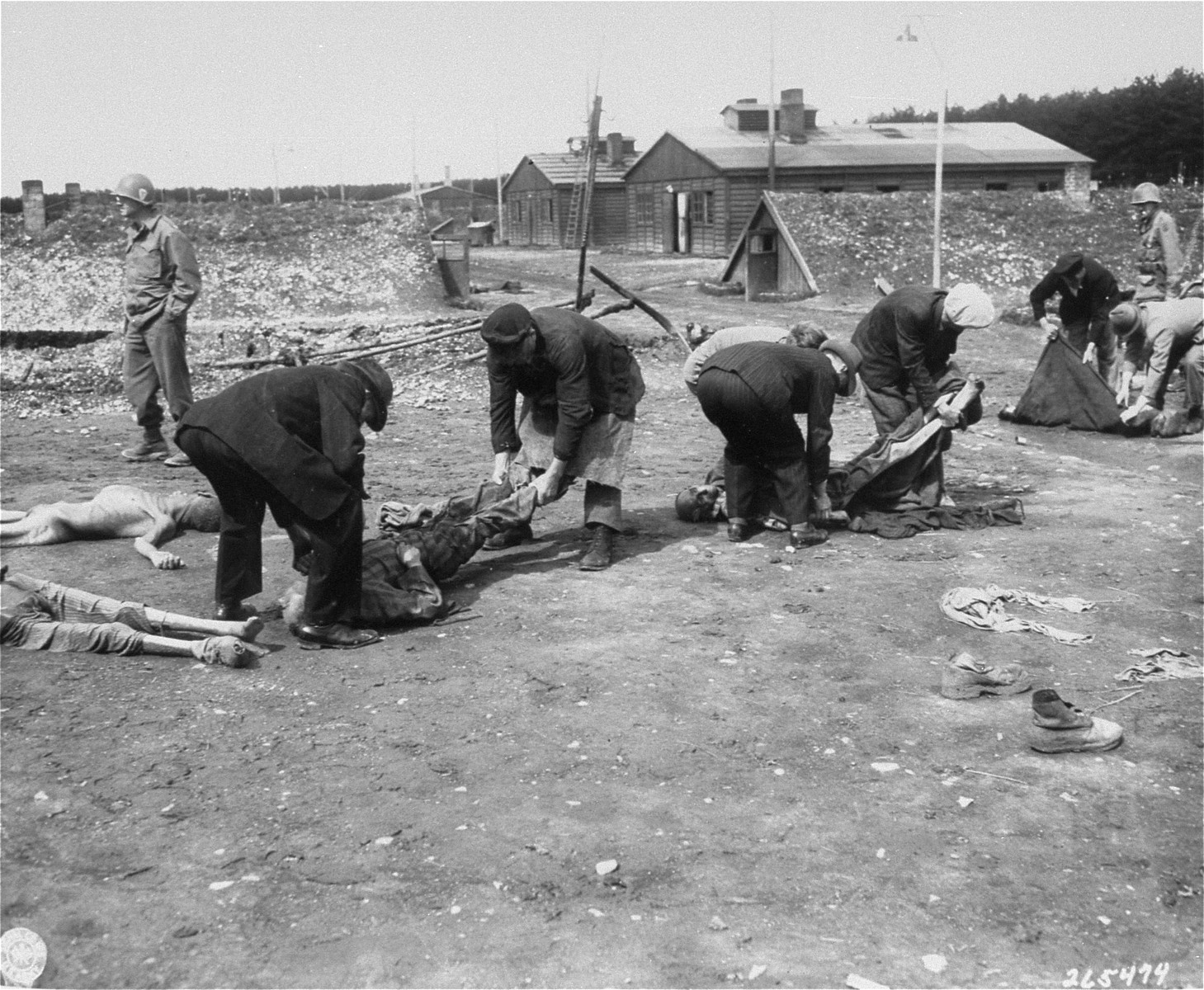
German civilians forced to bury victims

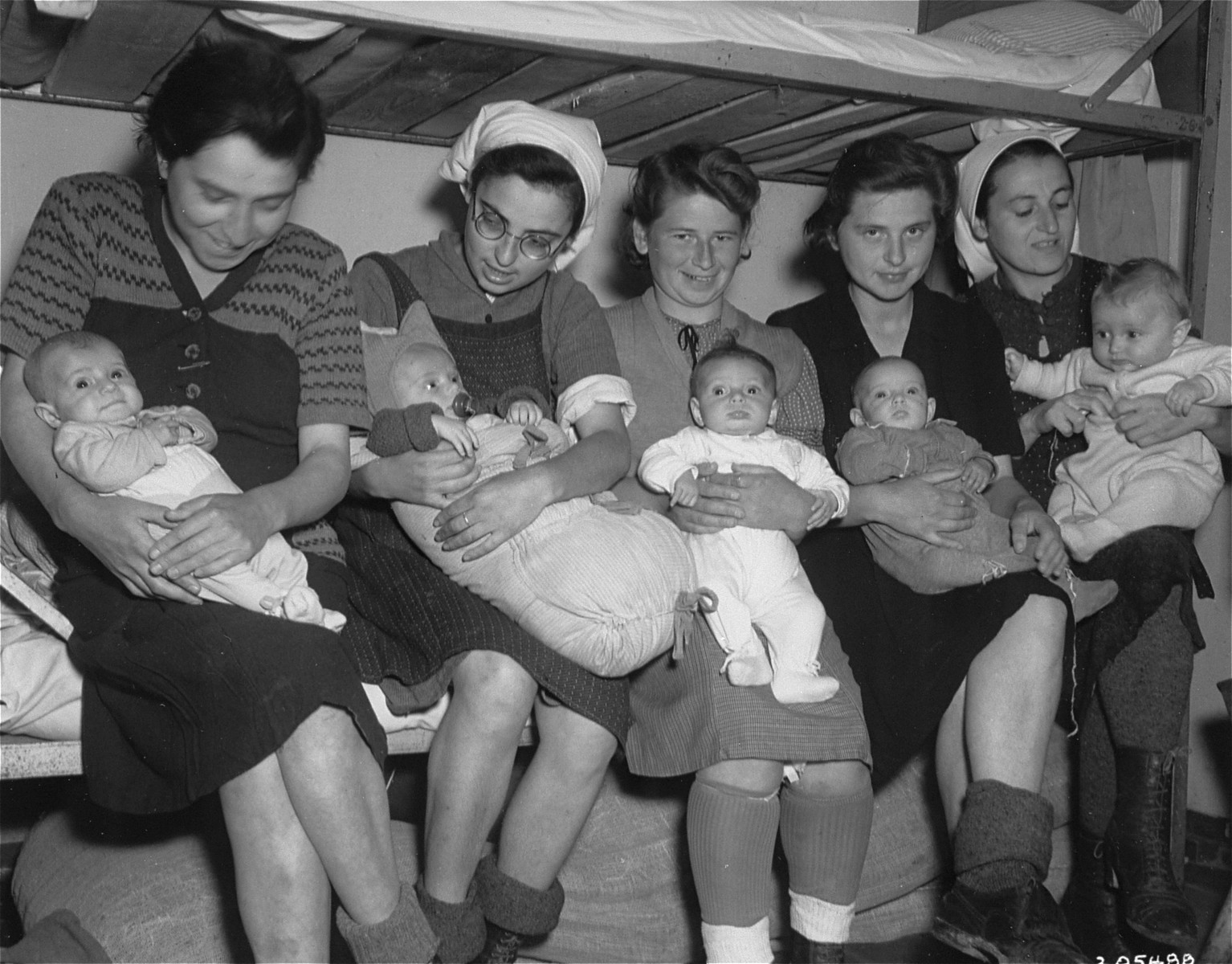
Five of the seven "Schwangerenkommando" women, and their infants, after liberation

== Liberation and aftermath ==
Kaufering IV (Hurlach) liberation and burials

The subcamps of Kaufering were liberated between 24 and 27 April 1945 by the Seventh United States Army.

The 12th Armored Division reached Kaufering IV on 27 April, with the 101st Airborne Division arriving the next day. The 522nd Field Artillery Battalion, which consisted entirely of Japanese Americans, also participated in the liberation, as did the 36th Infantry Division from 30 April. The liberators found 500 charred corpses, many of them naked, which they forced local German residents to bury. The remaining structures were "indescribably filthy" because dying prisoners had been left there. American soldiers documented the camps in photographs and newsreels. One of the liberators reported:

Our first sight of the camp was appalling. Inside the enclosure we could see three rows of bodies, approximately 200, mostly nude. We entered the camp to look it over. The bodies were in all shapes and conditions. Some were half burned, others badly scorched. Their fists were clenched in the agonies of their death. Their eyes were bulging and dilated as though even in death they were seeing and enduring the horrors of their lives in prison. None were more than skin and bones. The camp had been partially destroyed by fire, these were the victims.

Nine of the forty defendants of the Dachau Trial were charged with crimes committed at Kaufering. In addition, three individuals stood trial individually in German courts for their actions at Kaufering, two of them former prisoner-functionaries at the camp. Aumeier was extradited to Poland, where he was convicted and executed. A large displaced persons camp was located in Landsberg in the postwar era, led by Lithuanian Jews who had survived Kaufering.

== Commemoration ==
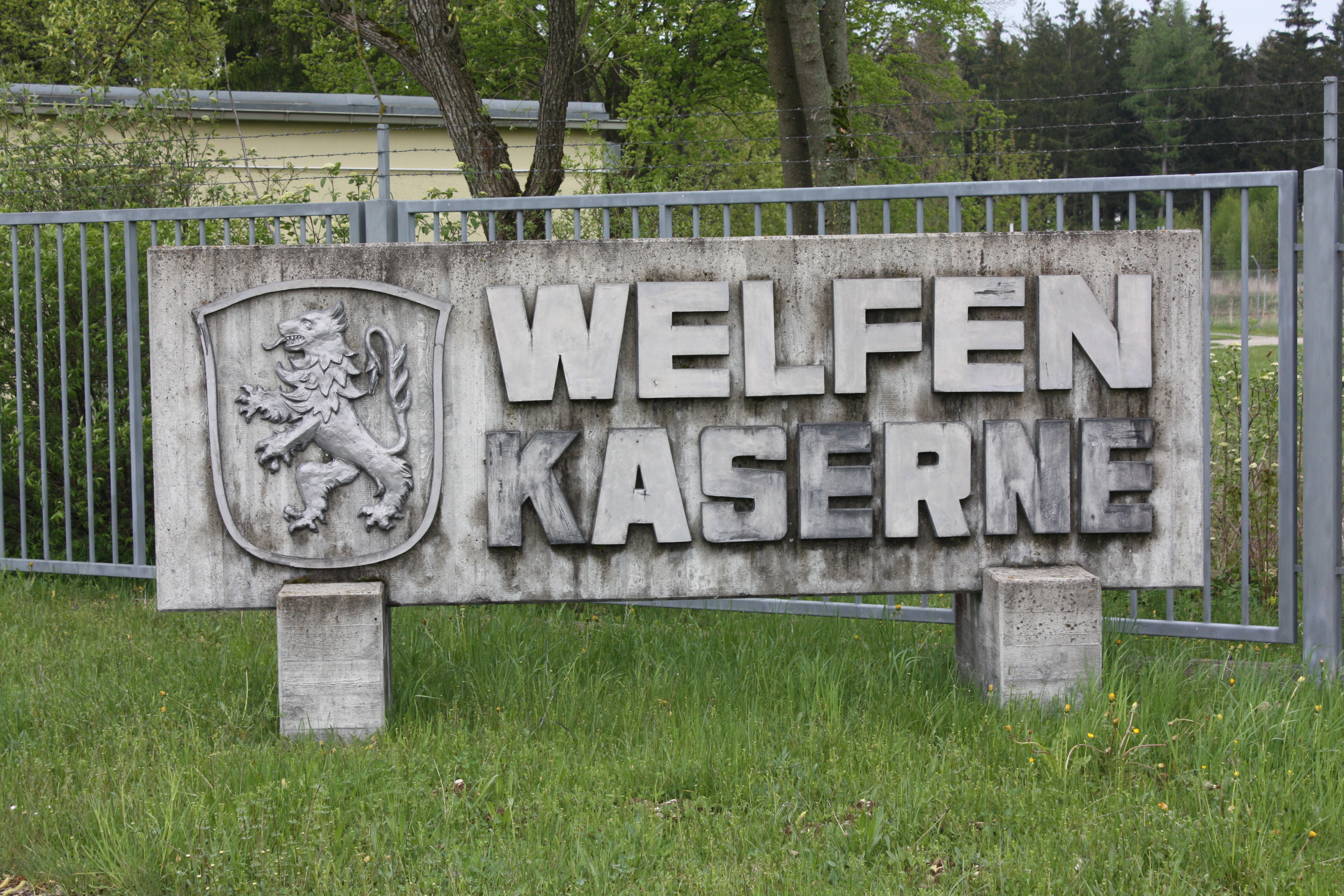
Entrance of the Welfenkaserne, German Air Force repair depot located at the former Weingut II bunker

There are dozens of "KZ-Friedhöfe" (mass graves) with the remains of thousands of people who died at Kaufering. The largest of these are at Kaufering II and III, with about 2,000 and 1,500 victims respectively. Many of the grave markers are overgrown and difficult to find. By the railroad tracks outside the village of Schwabhausen, there are three mass graves next to the railway line, victims of Allied strafing, which are marked by plaques. At Sankt Ottilien there is a small cemetery with the remains of about 40 prisoners who died shortly after liberation.

At the beginning of the 1980s, a private association called Landsberg im 20. Jahrhundert (Landsberg in the 20th Century) was formed to commemorate Kaufering. The site of Kaufering VII was purchased after a Jewish survivor donated the money on the condition that a memorial be erected, which has not been accomplished. In 2014, the federal government gave 700,000 euros to the European Holocaust Memorial in Landsberg (Landsberg Holocaust Memorial Association) and the city of Landsberg donated land with architectural remains. Restoration work was done between 2009 and 2016 on three intact and three ruined earthen huts and the housing of the SS guards, by the Europäische Holocaustgedenkstätte, winning the Bavarian Historic Conservation Prize in Gold. The site is fenced off and not accessible to visitors, but there are informational and commemorative plaques nearby. According to historian Edith Raim, the Landsberg im 20. Jahrhundert association and its director, Anton Posset, have refused access to the site to survivors and their families, the Israeli ambassador Shimon Stein, and inspectors of the Bavarian List of Monuments.

Besides Kaufering VII, there are hardly any remnants of the Kaufering subcamps, whose locations were only definitively established due to Raim's work. Most of the sites are now used for gardens, forests, agriculture, or housing. Landsberg am Lech has a prominent plaque in the center of town commemorating the German soldiers who died in both World Wars, but no memorial to the Holocaust victims. There is a modest memorial at Kaufering III, while a student project to establish an information board was not maintained and fell into disrepair. Only grave markers remain at Kaufering II and VI. A tennis court operates on the former site of Kaufering I, while Kaufering VI has been built over and there is a McDonald's nearby. Traces of the fire set by the SS at Kaufering IV were destroyed by gravel-mining in the 1980s; a hunting tower resembling the guard towers at concentration camps was erected by a local resident, which one visitor found "rather disturbing".

Only one of the bunkers built by slave laborers, Weingut II, survives. During the 1960s, it was repurposed for use by the Bundeswehr, as part of the Welfenkaserne facility, and is still in use as a repair facility by the German Air Force, as of 2018.

Kaufering memorials

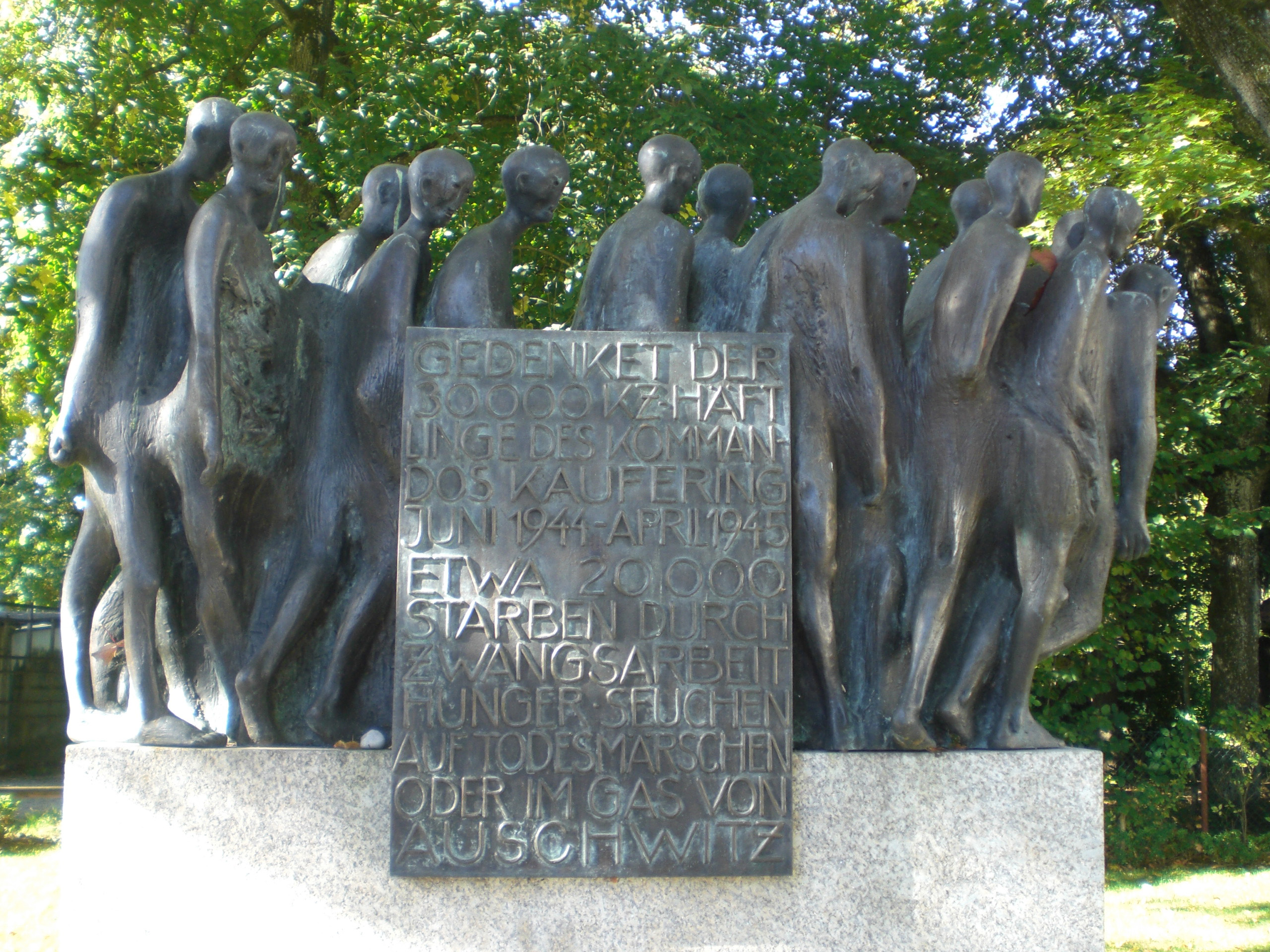
Memorial at the train station in Kaufering

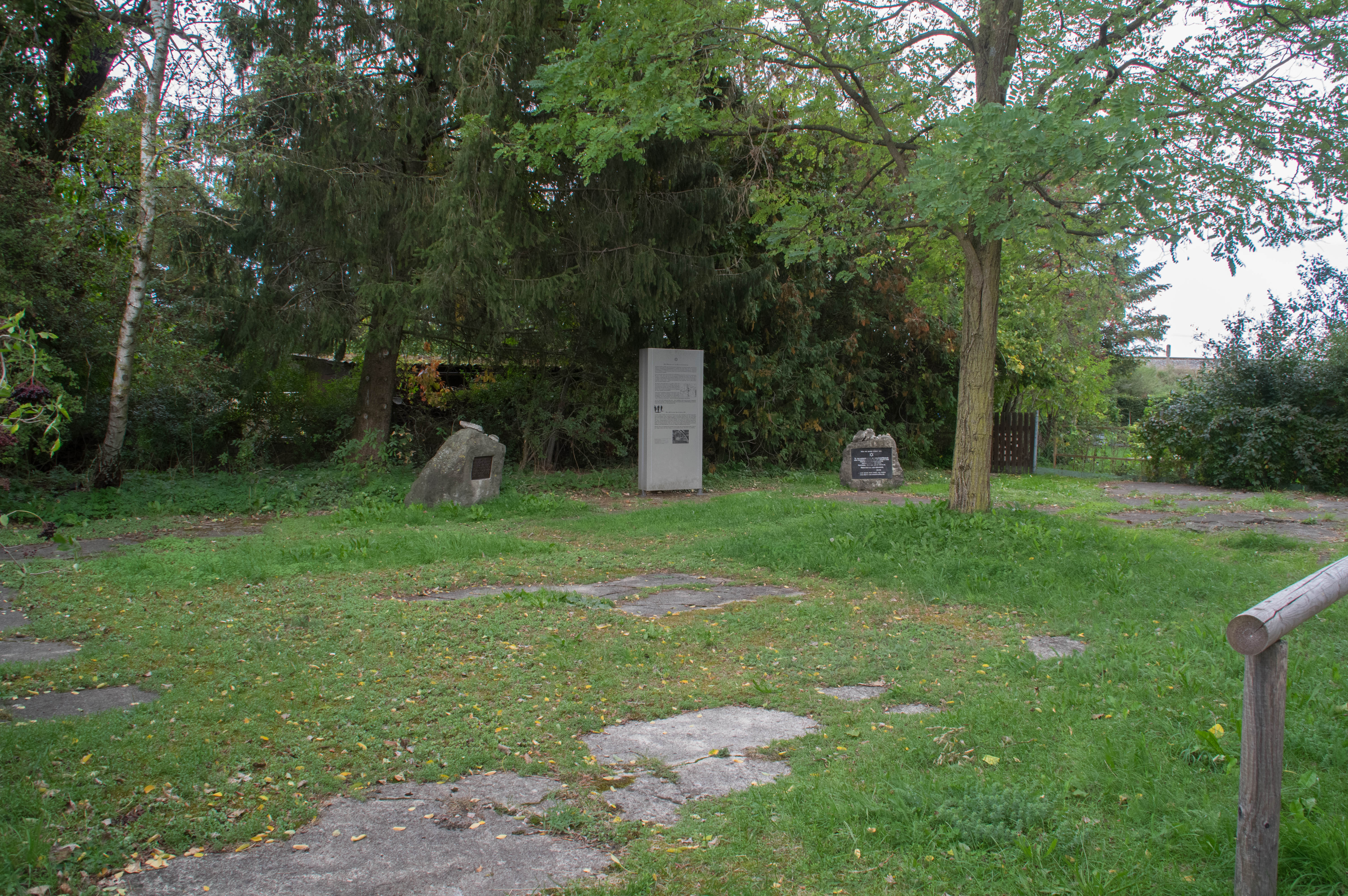
Kaufering III memorials

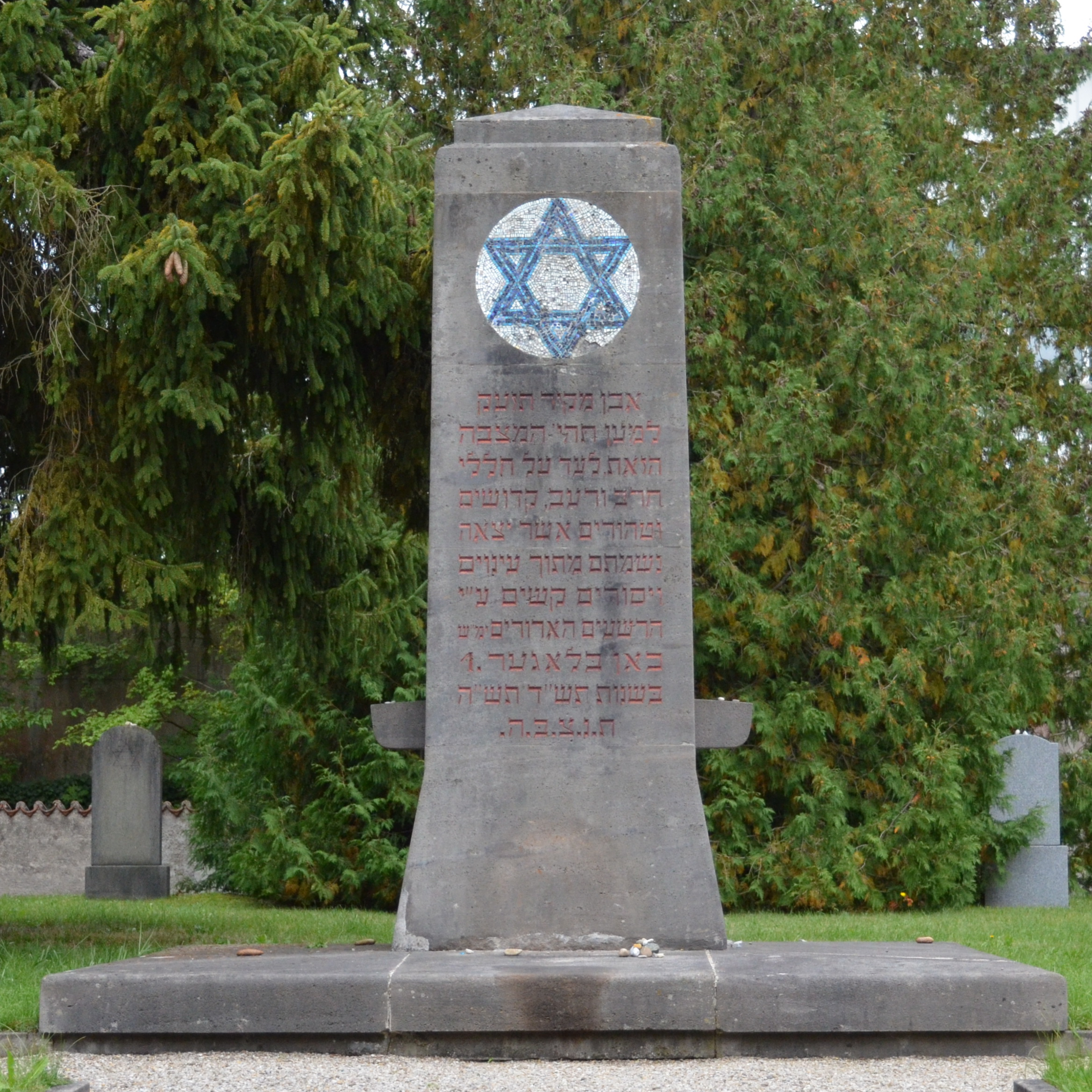
Memorial at Landsberg am Lech mass grave

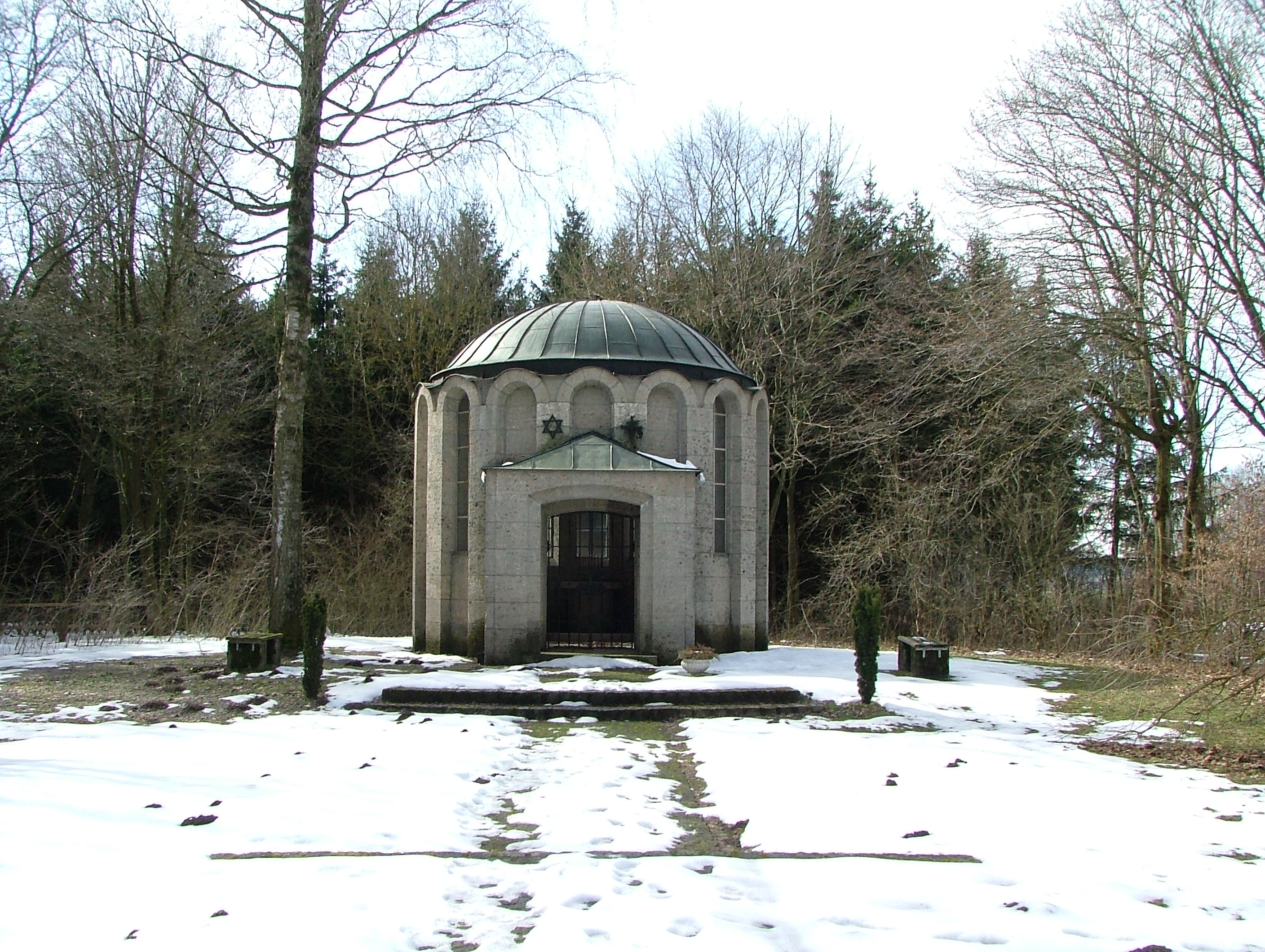
Entrance to the cemetery at Türkheim (Kaufering VI)

=== List of cemeteries of Kaufering subcamps ===
see German article with pictures

- Concentration camp cemetery for the Kaufering I – Landsberg remote camp (Landsberg industrial estate) 48.063785°N 10.854417°E
- Concentration camp cemetery for the Kaufering II – Igling remote camp (near the Aussiedlerhof, built by the concentration camp command of Otto Moll, the gas chamber commander of Auschwitz) 48.0510579°N 10.8214350°E
- Concentration camp cemetery for the Kaufering II – Igling and XI – Stadtwaldhof/Landsberg remote camps (Landsberg/Holzhausen intersection) 48.047752°N 10.820472°E
- Concentration camp cemetery for the Kaufering III – Kaufering remote camp (barrage weir) 48.112719°N 10.858956°E
- Concentration camp cemetery for the Kaufering IV – Hurlach external camp (barrage weir), for those who were found later 48.113345°N 10.859092°E
- Kaufering IV – Hurlach Cemetery of the Holocaust, April 27, 1945, directly in the former concentration camp area, built by the American liberators 48.1027219°N 10.8452623°E
- Concentration camp cemetery for those deceased after liberation in Holzhausen/Buchloe 48.0451668°N 10.7864566°E
- Concentration camp cemetery for theKaufering VI – Türkheim remote camp in Türkheim-Bahnhof 48.053637°N 10.6128850°E
- Concentration camp cemetery for the Kaufering VII – Erpfting remote camp (near the Maria oak chapel, at the junction Landsberg - Erpfting district) 48.026261°N 10.844477°E
- Concentration camp cemetery for the Kaufering VIII – Seestall remote camp (at the barrage weir at Lech in Seestall) 47.9633616°N 10.8791459°E
- Concentration camp cemetery for the Kaufering IX – Obermeitingen concentration camp remote camp – unknown.
- Concentration camp cemetery for the Kaufering V and X – Utting remote camp (on the connecting road from Utting to Holzhausen) 48.01409°N 11.08612°E
- Concentration camp cemetery in Sankt Ottilien for survivors of the transport train to Dachau of 27 April 1945 next to the Christian cemetery of the monks of the monastery Sankt Ottilien 48.0943491°N 11.0478698°E
- Three concentration camp memorial stones with Hebrew inscription indicate: "Dead Jewish victims of an air raid on the transport train with Jewish concentration camp prisoners of the Kaufering concentration camp command of 27 April 1945". 48.102298°N 10.974019°E

== In popular culture ==
The liberation of Kaufering IV was depicted in the second half of Episode 9 "Why We Fight" of the TV mini-series Band of Brothers, a dramatization of E Company, 506th Infantry Regiment, 101st Airborne Division. Although it was filmed in Hertfordshire, England, the episode is a realistic recreation of actual events depicted in historic photos and newsreels. For example, the soldiers have to confine the prisoners to the camp because there is not enough medical care available, and German civilians are forced to bury the dead. The American soldiers, who had previously fought from a parachute landing on D-Day through France and Germany, have become disillusioned, but confronting the horrors of the Nazi regime reminds them why they are fighting the war. Commentators rate the episode as one of the best of the series. American writer J. D. Salinger, the author of Catcher in the Rye, was one of the liberators of Kaufering IV.

Austrian psychiatrist Viktor Frankl was deported from Theresienstadt to Kaufering via Auschwitz in October 1944; he spent five months in Kaufering III and was transferred to Kaufering VI in March 1945. His 1946 memoir, Man's Search for Meaning, has sold more than ten million copies and been translated into 24 languages. Large parts of the book are purportedly set in Auschwitz, where Frankl spent three days, but actually depict his experience at Kaufering. In the book, Frankl develops his theory of logotherapy and argues that prisoners who maintained a positive attitude were more likely to survive. His work has however not been positively received by Holocaust historians, who maintain that Frankl's theories do not explain why some prisoners survived and others did not.
