= RAIM =

RAIM or Raim may refer to:

- Edith Raim (1965–2025), German historian
- Raum, a demon
- Receiver autonomous integrity monitoring
- Redundant array of independent memory
