= Igling (Verwaltungsgemeinschaft) =

- Verwaltungsgemeinschaft
- Location of Igling within Landsberg district
- Interactive map of Igling
- Location within Germany Location within Bavaria
- Coordinates: 48°04′N 10°49′E
- Country: Germany
- State: Bavaria
- Admin. region: Upper Bavaria
- District: Landsberg
- Seat: Igling
- Subdivisions: 3 municipalities

Area
  - Total: 53.45 km^{2} (20.64 sq mi)

Population (2025-12-31)
  - Total: 6,269
  - Density: 117.3/km^{2} (303.8/sq mi)
- Time zone: UTC+01:00 (CET)
  - Summer (DST): UTC+02:00 (CEST)
- Website: www.vg-igling.de

Igling is a Verwaltungsgemeinschaft (municipal association) in the district of Landsberg am Lech in Bavaria, Germany. Its seat is in Igling. It consists of the following municipalities:

1. Hurlach
2. Igling
3. Obermeitingen
