= Hurlach =

- Municipality
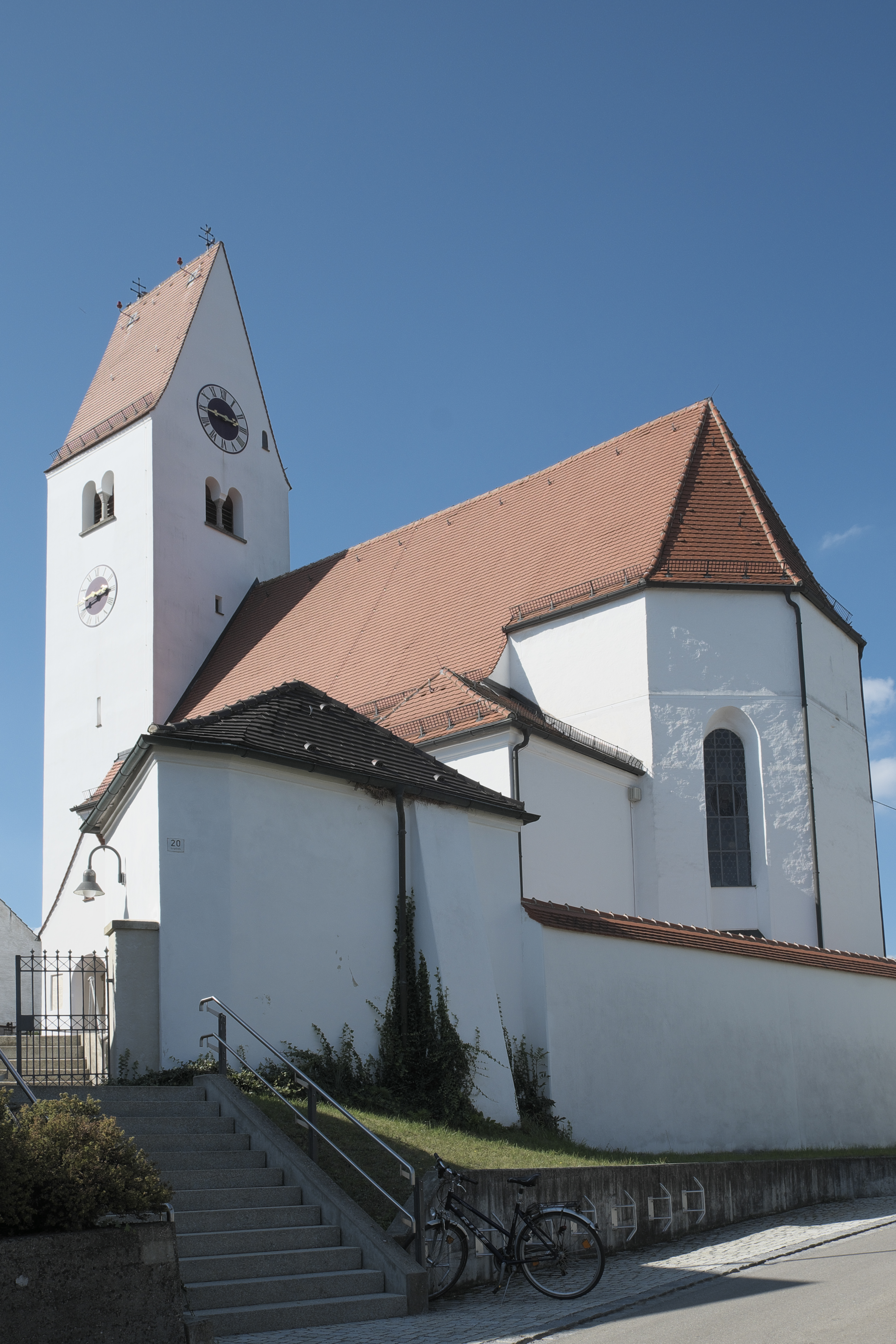
- Church of Saint Lawrence

- Coat of arms

- Location of Hurlach within Landsberg am Lech district
- Interactive map of Hurlach
- Location within Germany Location within Bavaria
- Coordinates: 48°07′N 10°49′E
- Country: Germany
- State: Bavaria
- Admin. region: Oberbayern
- District: Landsberg am Lech
- Municipal assoc.: Igling
- Subdivisions: 2 Ortsteile

Government
  - Mayor (2020–26): Andreas Glatz (CSU)

Area
  - Total: 17.15 km^{2} (6.62 sq mi)
- Elevation: 584 m (1,916 ft)

Population (2025-12-31)
  - Total: 1,951
  - Density: 113.8/km^{2} (294.6/sq mi)
- Time zone: UTC+01:00 (CET)
  - Summer (DST): UTC+02:00 (CEST)
- Postal codes: 86857
- Dialling codes: 08248
- Vehicle registration: LL
- Website: www.hurlach.de

Hurlach is a municipality in the district of Landsberg in Bavaria in Germany.

== Liberation of Hurlach satellite camp ==
During World War II, Kaufering concentration camp IV, a subcamp of Dachau concentration camp, was located about a mile south of the village Hurlach. The camp was discovered by soldiers of the 134th Ordnance Maintenance Battalion of the 12th Armored Division led by Capt. John P. Jones around noon on April 27, 1945. The SS began death marching prisoners to Dachau pending the US arrival; at camp IV, they killed hundreds of prisoners by setting fire to the barracks. Colonel Edward F. Seiller, commander of the 12th Armored Division's Military Government, took control of the camp and had some 250 civilians from the nearby town of Landsberg brought to the camp and made them bury the dead prisoners.

On April 29, 1945, advance scouts of the US Army's Nisei 522nd Field Artillery Battalion, a segregated Japanese-American Allied military unit in World War II, encountered a "set of barracks surrounded by barbed wire", and liberated what turned out to be the "Kaufering IV Hurlach" slave labor camp, which housed some 3,000 prisoners, which was one of some 169 "satellite" camps of the infamous Dachau concentration camp.

In 2000, the concentration camp complex gained international recognition through the collaboration of Anton Posset with the film crew of Steven Spielberg and Tom Hanks. Liberation of one of the Kaufering IV subcamps of Dachau was depicted in Episode 9 "Why We Fight" of the TV mini-series Band of Brothers. Through the photographs of the American/French liberators and the documentation of the survivor's reports collected by Anton Posset, the camp was reconstructed in England for the mini-series.
