= Edith Raim =

German historian (1965–2025)

Edith Raim (German: [ˈeːdɪt ˈʁaɪm]; 1965 – 1 July 2025) was a German historian who studied the Nazi era.

== Life and career ==
Raim was born in Munich in 1965. She grew up in Landsberg am Lech and first became interested in the topic after watching Holocaust as a child. Being a student of Anton Posset she started under his guidance the historical reappraisal of the concentration camp complex Kaufering, a sub-camp of Dachau concentration camp. Her 1991 dissertation at LMU Munich was titled Die Dachauer KZ-Außenkommandos Kaufering und Mühldorf: Rüstungsbauten und Zwangsarbeit im letzten Kriegsjahr 1944/45 and concerned the Dachau subcamps of Kaufering and Mühldorf. Raim died on 1 July 2025.

== Works (selection) ==
- Raim, Edith (2013). Justiz zwischen Diktatur und Demokratie, Wiederaufbau und Ahndung von NS-Verbrechen in Westdeutschland 1945-1949 [Justice between Dictatorship and Democracy: Democratic Restoration and Punishment of Nazi Crimes in West Germany from 1945 to 1949] (in German). De Gruyter. ISBN 978-3-486-73565-9.
- Raim, Edith (2021). The Rise of National Socialism in the Bavarian Highlands. A Microhistory of Murnau, 1919-1933. Routledge.
