= Obermeitingen =

- Municipality
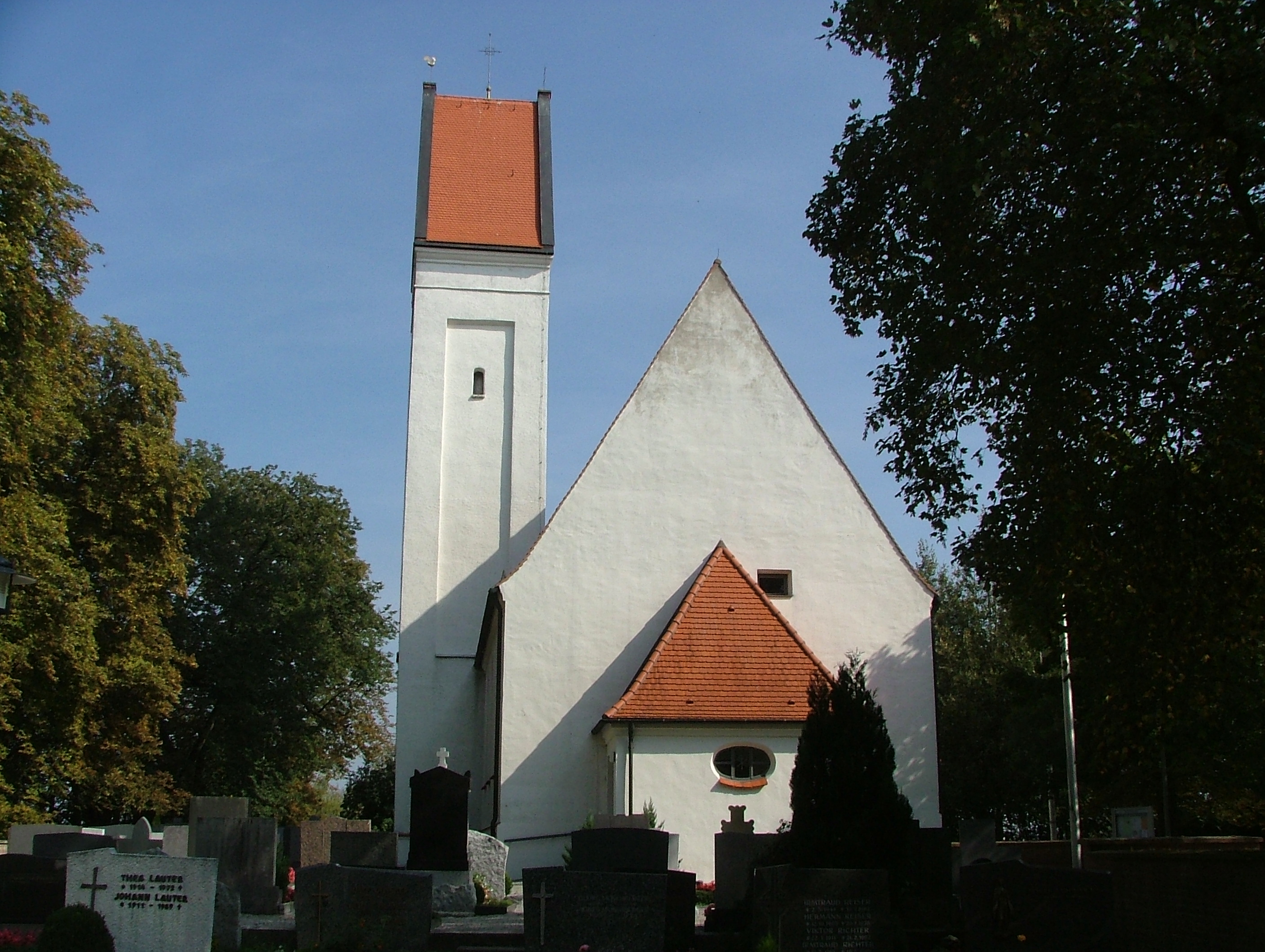
- Church of Saint Maurice

- Coat of arms

- Location of Obermeitingen within Landsberg am Lech district
- Interactive map of Obermeitingen
- Location within Germany Location within Bavaria
- Coordinates: 48°08′N 10°48′E
- Country: Germany
- State: Bavaria
- Admin. region: Oberbayern
- District: Landsberg am Lech
- Municipal assoc.: Igling
- Subdivisions: 3 Ortsteile

Government
  - Mayor (2020–26): Erwin Losert (CSU)

Area
  - Total: 9.93 km^{2} (3.83 sq mi)
- Elevation: 575 m (1,886 ft)

Population (2025-12-31)
  - Total: 1,767
  - Density: 178/km^{2} (461/sq mi)
- Time zone: UTC+01:00 (CET)
  - Summer (DST): UTC+02:00 (CEST)
- Postal codes: 86836
- Dialling codes: 08232
- Vehicle registration: LL
- Website: www.obermeitingen.de

Obermeitingen is a municipality in the district of Landsberg in Bavaria in Germany.
