= Igling =

- Municipality
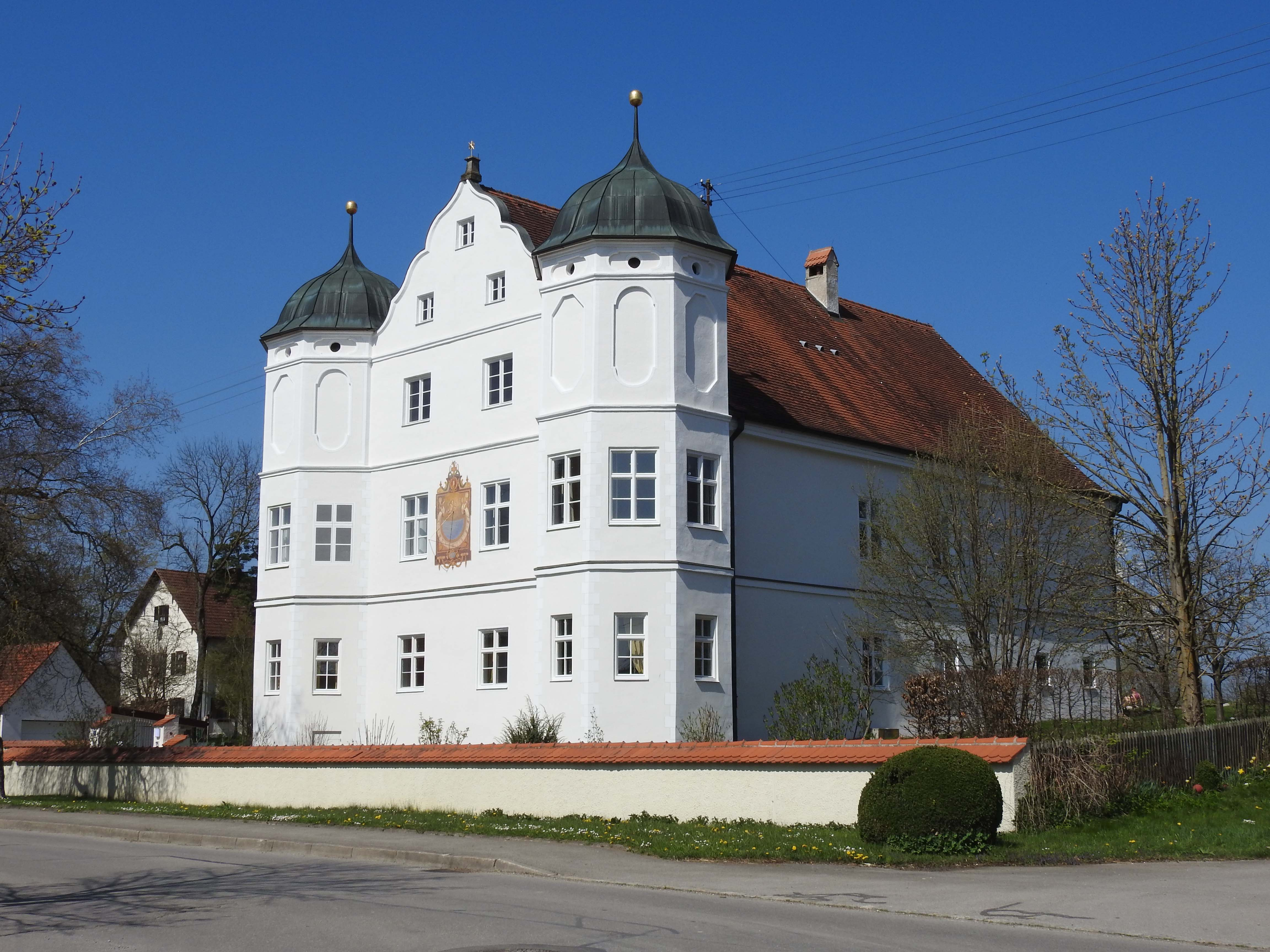
- Castle in Holzhausen bei Buchloe

- Coat of arms

- Location of Igling within Landsberg am Lech district
- Interactive map of Igling
- Location within Germany Location within Bavaria
- Coordinates: 48°04′N 10°48′E
- Country: Germany
- State: Bavaria
- Admin. region: Oberbayern
- District: Landsberg am Lech
- Municipal assoc.: Igling
- Subdivisions: 3 Ortsteile

Government
  - Mayor (2020–26): Günter Först (FW)

Area
  - Total: 26.37 km^{2} (10.18 sq mi)
- Elevation: 593–611 m (1,946–2,005 ft)

Population (2025-12-31)
  - Total: 2,551
  - Density: 96.74/km^{2} (250.6/sq mi)
- Time zone: UTC+01:00 (CET)
  - Summer (DST): UTC+02:00 (CEST)
- Postal codes: 86859
- Dialling codes: 08248
- Vehicle registration: LL
- Website: www.igling.de

Igling is a municipality in the district of Landsberg in Bavaria in Germany.

== Subdivisions ==
The municipality Igling consists of the subdivisions (Ortsteile) Holzhausen, Unterigling and Oberigling.

== Population development ==
In 1970 1,656 were residing in Igling, in 1987 1,767 people lived in Igling, and 2005 2,125 residents lived in Igling.

== History ==
Igling belonged to the barons of Donnersberg. The village was part of the Electorate of Bavaria and formed a "geschlossenes Hofmark" which place of residence Oberigling has been. In the course of administrative reform in Bavaria accrued through the Gemeindeedikt today's municipal.
During the second world war many areas were dispossessed. The castle was confiscated by the SS and happened to be the field office of the Landsberger jail after the war. Until 1945 the Lager II der Außenlagergruppe Landsberg/Kaufering of the concentration camp Dachau existed there. Afterward fugitives were accommodated in the castle.

The train station on the rail route Munich-Memmingen has been closed.

== Politics ==
Mayor of Igling is Christl Weinmüller.

== Culture and sights ==
- The Castle of Igling, privately owned, with castle restaurant and golf course.
- Parish Church John the Baptist, baroque church
- Brewery in Holzhausen with beer garden
- Iglinger Sommerkeller, disco and bar
- 2 concentration camp cemeteries

== Education ==
In 1999 the following institutions existed:

- Kindergarten: 71 kids
- Elementary school: 1 with 8 teachers and 303 pupils
