= Kaufering, Bavaria =

Kaufering
- Municipality
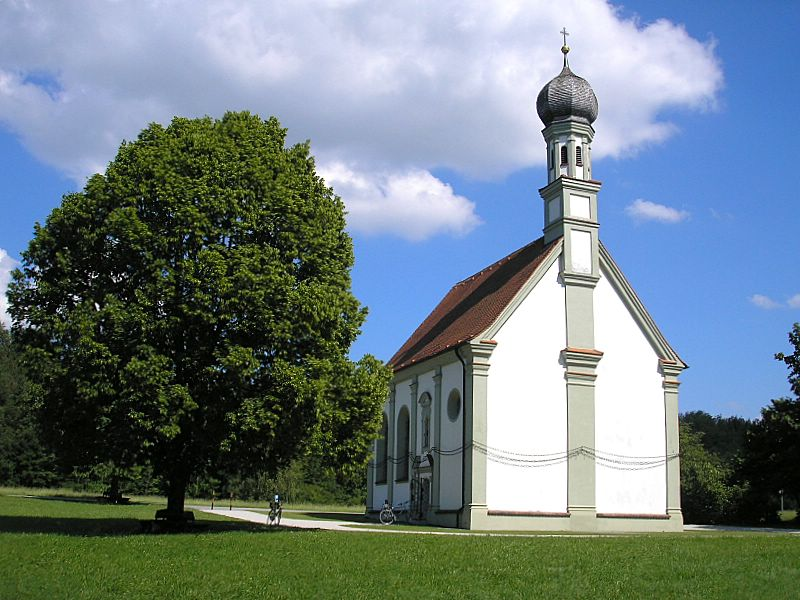
- Pilgrimage Church of Saint Leonhard

- Coat of arms

- Location of Kaufering within Landsberg am Lech district
- Interactive map of Kaufering
- Location within Germany Location within Bavaria
- Coordinates: 48°05′N 10°53′E
- Country: Germany
- State: Bavaria
- Admin. region: Oberbayern
- District: Landsberg am Lech

Government
  - Mayor (2019–25): Thomas Salzberger (SPD)

Area
  - Total: 17.68 km^{2} (6.83 sq mi)
- Elevation: 585–630 m (1,919–2,067 ft)

Population (2025-12-31)
  - Total: 10,040
  - Density: 567.9/km^{2} (1,471/sq mi)
- Time zone: UTC+01:00 (CET)
  - Summer (DST): UTC+02:00 (CEST)
- Postal codes: 86916
- Dialling codes: 08191
- Vehicle registration: LL
- Website: www.kaufering.de

Kaufering (German pronunciation: [ˈkaʊfəʁɪŋ]) is a municipality in the district of Landsberg in Bavaria in Germany. It lies on the river Lech.

During World War II, a subcamp of Dachau concentration camp was located there.

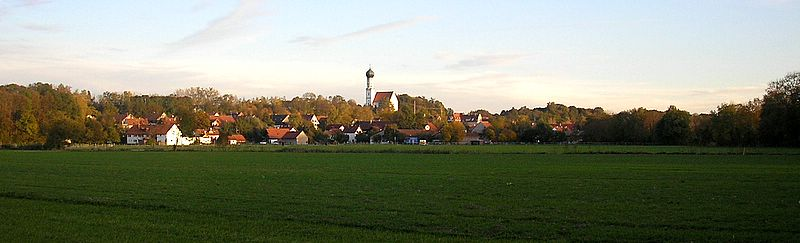
The old part of Kaufering, seen from north west

== Notable people ==
- Andreas Mäckler (born 1958), German editor
