= Ummendorf =

Ummendorf is a German toponym, it may refer to:

- Ummendorf, Saxony-Anhalt
- Ummendorf, Baden-Württemberg
- Ummendorf district of the town Pürgen
