= DELO Industrial Adhesives =

German adhesives company

DELO Industrie Klebstoffe GmbH & Co. KGaA
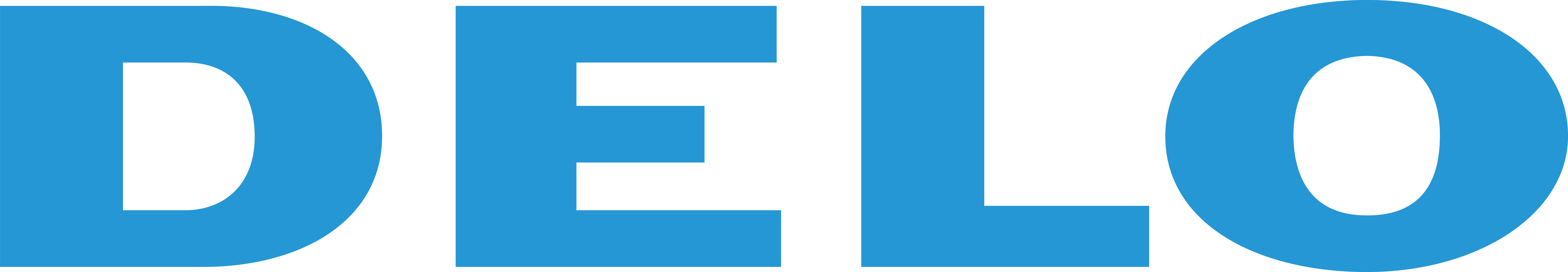
- Type: GmbH & Co. KGaA
- Founded: 1961
- Headquarters: Windach, Germany
- Key people: Wolf-Dietrich Herold; Sabine Herold; Karl Bitzer; Christian Walther
- Products: Industrial adhesives, UV curing lamps, microdispensing valves
- Revenue: €264 million (FY 2025/2026)
- Number of employees: 1.215 (05/2026)
- Website: www.delo-adhesives.com

DELO Industrie Klebstoffe GmbH & Co. KGaA (inherent spelling: DELO; international brand name: DELO Industrial Adhesives) is a manufacturer of industrial adhesives and equipment for dispensing as well as curing adhesives. The company has its headquarters in Windach, Germany.

Founded in 1961, Sabine and Wolf-Dietrich Herold took over DELO in the course of a management buy-out and converted it into an independent, owner-managed company.

== Products and technology ==
Adhesives, potting compounds and optical materials from DELO are mainly used for microelectronic and optical applications in the semicon and automotive industry as well as in consumer electronics. The company specializes in UV curing and dual-curing polymers for high-volume industrial production. These products obtain their complete or initial strength under UV light.

== World Record ==
Since 2019, the company has held the world record for the heaviest weight lifted with adhesive—3 grams of adhesive held a 17.5-ton truck.
