= Scheuring (disambiguation) =

Scheuring is a municipality in Germany.

Scheuring may also refer to:

- Joanna Scheuring-Wielgus (born 1972), Polish politician
- Hanna Scheuring (born 1965), Swiss actress and theatre director
- Herman Zdzisław Scheuring (1894-1963), Polish medical doctor and soldier
- Paul Scheuring (born 1968), American screenwriter and director
- Richard Scheuring, American osteopathic physician and a NASA flight surgeon
- Thomas Scheuring (born 1981), German footballer
- Witold Scheuring
