= Miliarium =

Ancient Roman pillar listing the distance to a nearby settlement

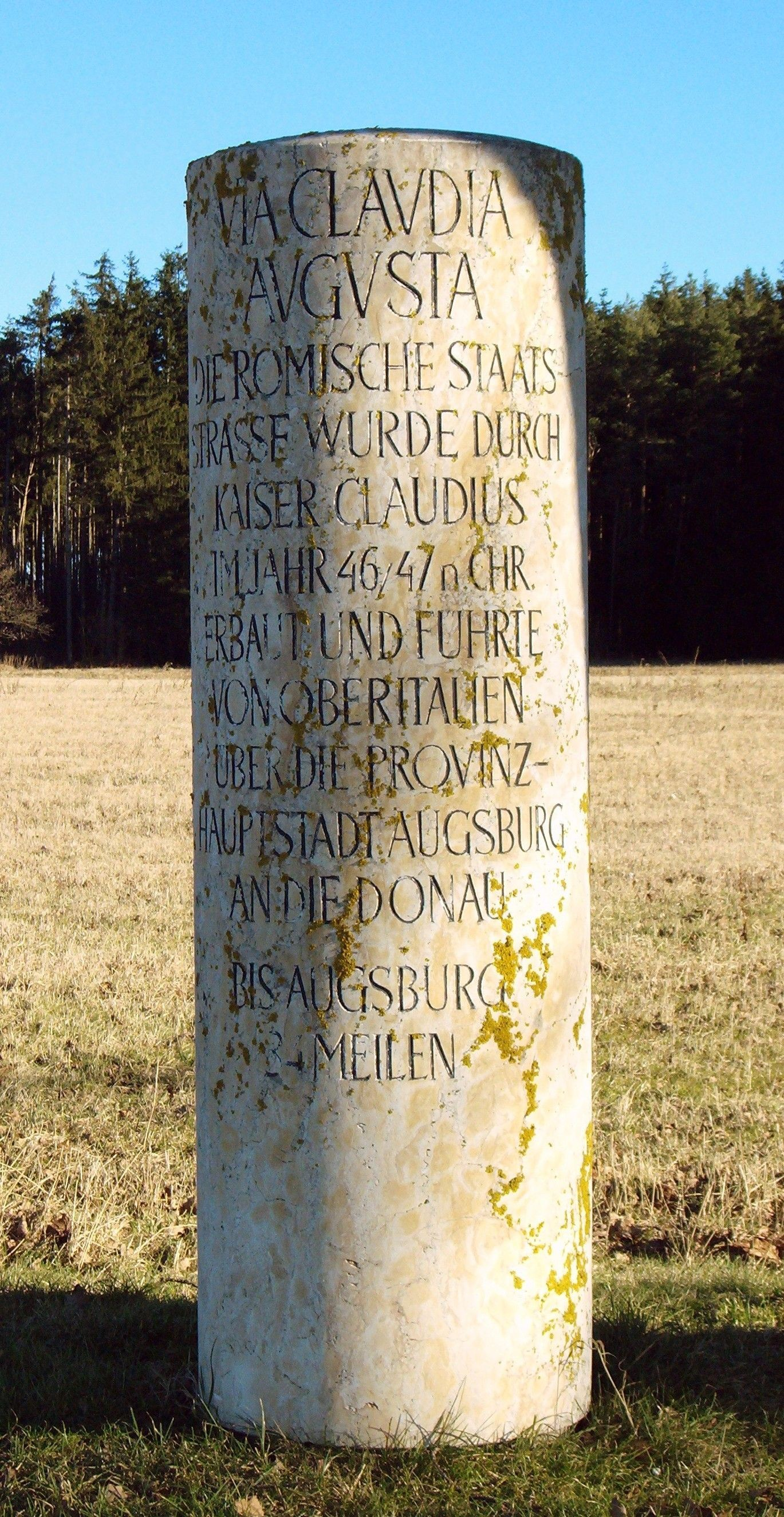
Replica of a milestone on the Via Claudia Augusta near Unterdiessen, Germany, with a modern inscription in German

A miliarium (Classical Latin: [miːllɪˈaːrɪ.ũː ˈau̯rɛ.ũː]) was a cylindrical, oval or parallelepiped column placed on the edge of Roman roads to mark the distances every thousand passus (double Roman steps), that is, every mile. Today, this is equivalent to a distance of approximately 1480 meters. The stone known as the Milliarium Aureum was the point used to indicate the distance to Rome from any point in the Roman Empire.

These physical markers of distance corresponded to the abstract route descriptions found in Roman itinerarium, which were text-based lists of cities, stops, and the distances between them.

== Background ==
The columns were made of granite, marble or whatever local stone was available. Each had a cubic or square pedestal and measured between 6.6 to 13.1 feet (2.0 to 4.0 m), with a diameter of 19.5 to 31.5 inches (50 to 80 cm). Miliarium were widely used by Roman road builders and were an important part of any road network. In those times, the distance that could be travelled each day was sometimes only a few miles. Many miliaria only record the name of the reigning emperor without giving any place names or distances. The first known miliaria appeared on the Appian Way during the final period of the Roman Republic, but the vast majority of those that still exist were made during the High Empire and, to a lesser extent, in the 3rd and 4th centuries.

Most of the milestones carried directly engraved inscriptions, depending on the importance of the road or the proximity or distance from Rome, or the cities of origin and destination. The inscription always consisted of a series of well-defined parts:

1. The full title of the emperor under whose rule the road was built or modified.
2. The distance to Rome or the most important town on the route.
3. The governor and/or the military unit responsible for the works on the road.
4. The expression refecit or reparavit if it was a road maintenance work

In the 4th century, the milestones lost their usefulness as mileposts, becoming an element of political propaganda for the emperors.

In the Western Roman Empire, the last miliaria were made at the time of the emperors Theodosius I and Honorius. With the barbarian invasions and the Fall of the Western Roman Empire, they ceased to be carved when the maintenance of the roads disappeared. In the Eastern Roman Empire, the roads continued to be maintained until the 6th century, although the miliaria became increasingly rare until they were no longer erected. Being written in Latin, they lost their functionality among a population that spoke mainly Greek.

== Gallery ==
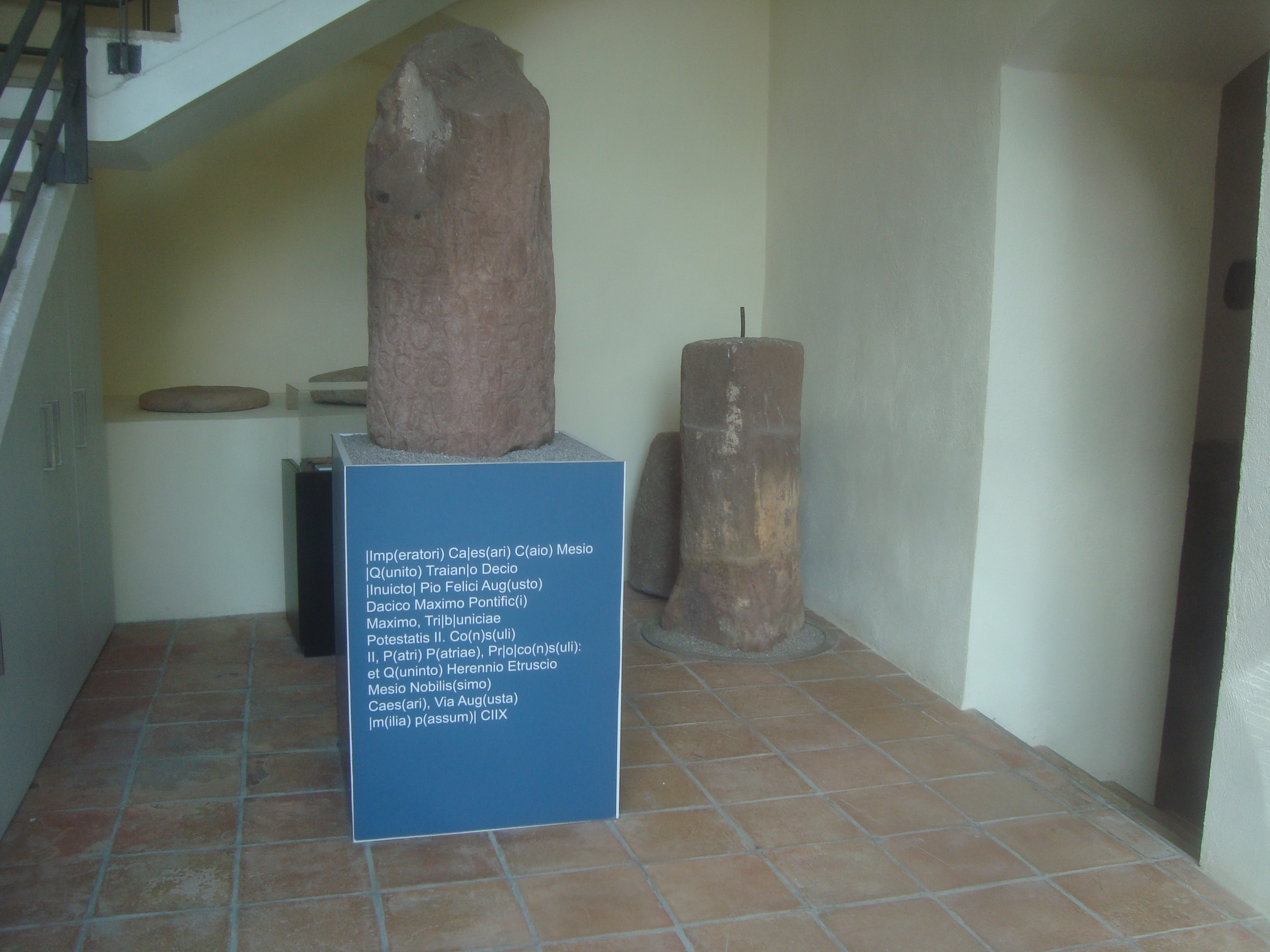
Roman milestone of Emperor Trajan Decius, found in Borriol, Spain

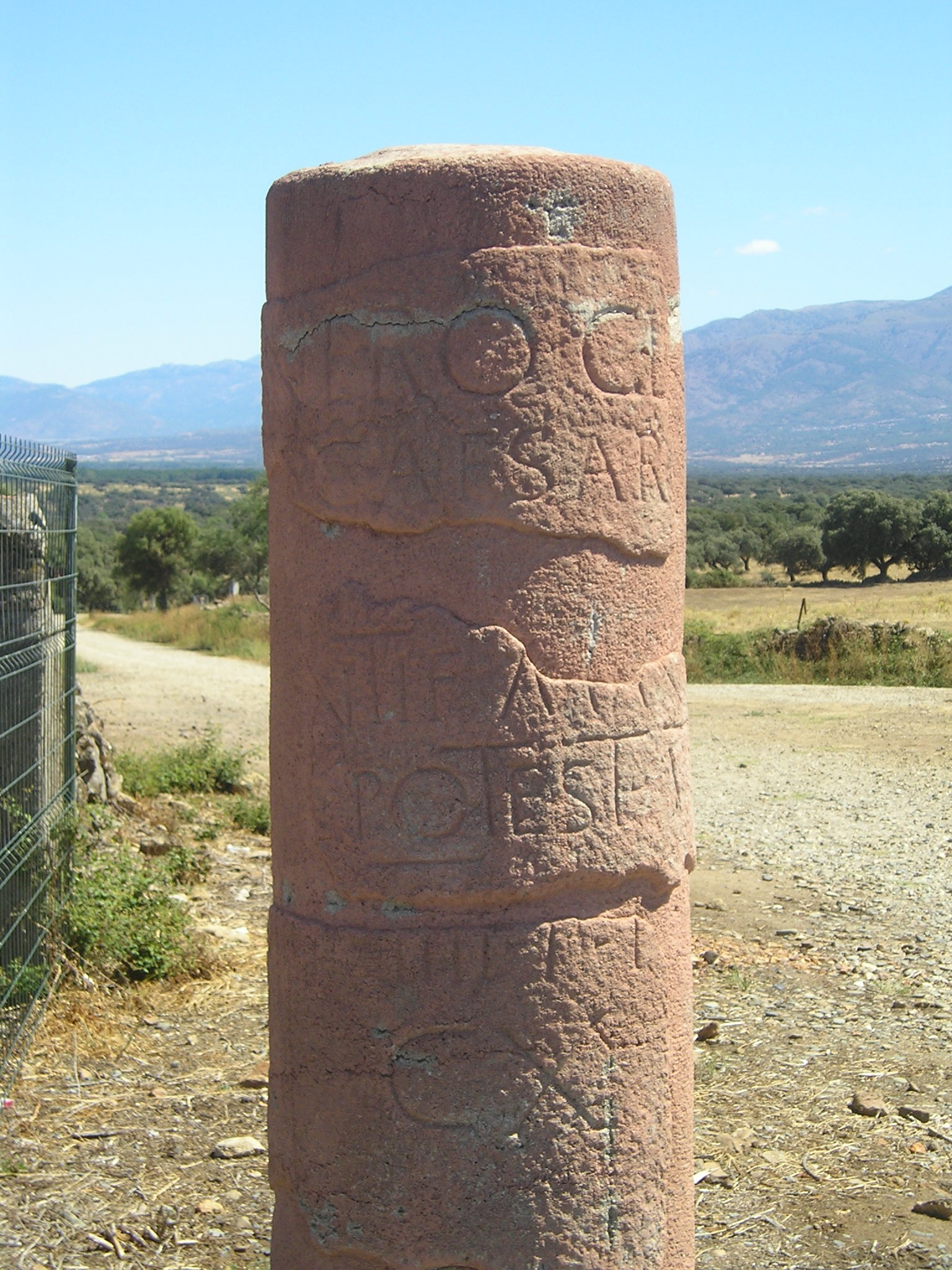
Nero's miliarium on the Vía de la Plata in the Municipium Capara, in the northern part of the Province of Cáceres in Spain

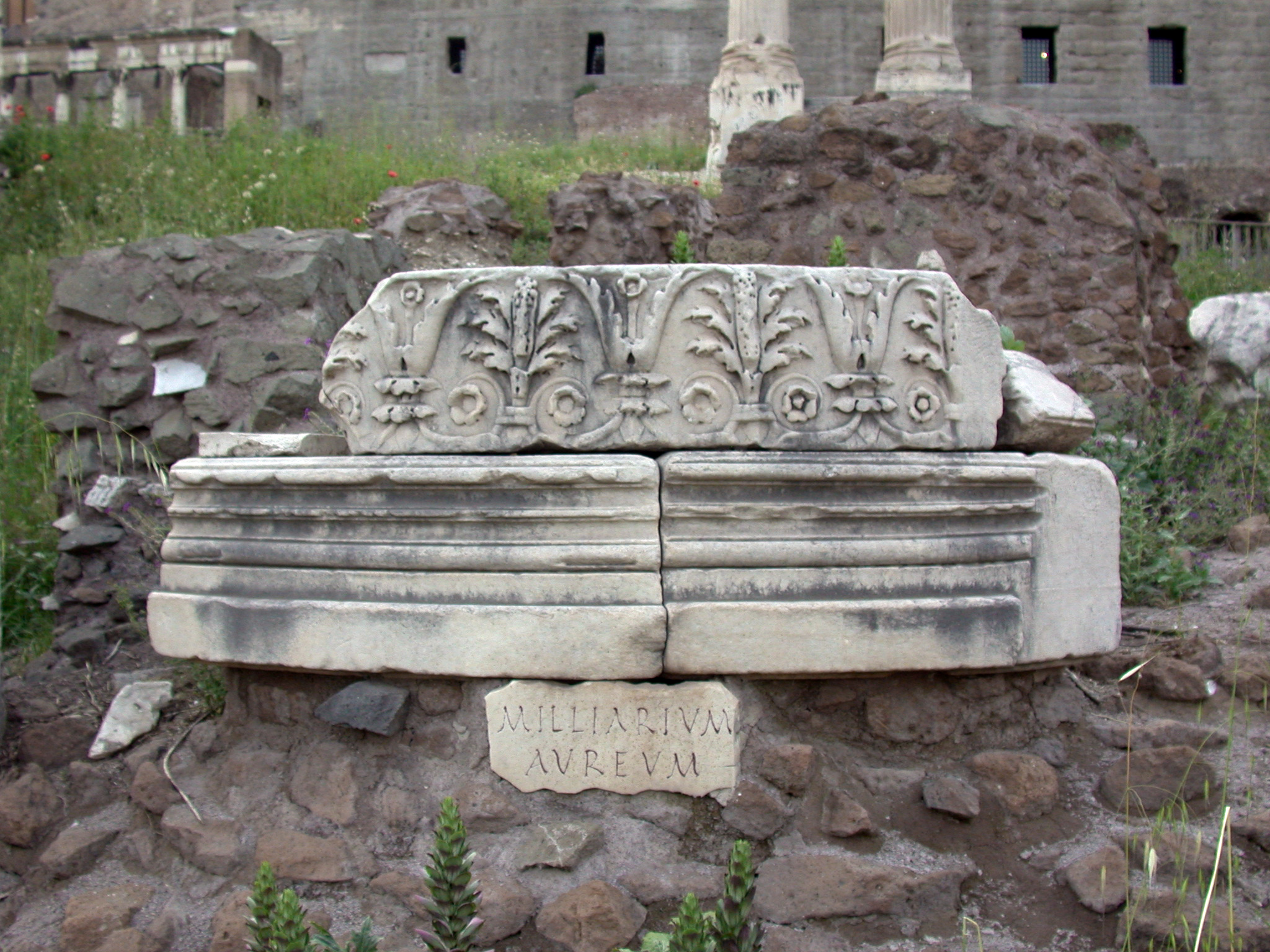
Milliarium Aureum in the Roman Forum

== See also ==
- Highway location marker
- Pes (unit)
- milestone
