= Hofstetten =

Hofstetten may refer to the following places:

- in Austria:
  - Hofstetten-Grünau
- in Germany:
  - Hofstetten, Bavaria, in the district of Landsberg
  - Hofstetten, Baden-Württemberg, in the Ortenau district
- in Switzerland:
  - Hofstetten bei Brienz, in the canton of Berne
  - Hofstetten, Zürich, in the canton of Zürich
  - Hofstetten-Flüh, in the canton of Solothurn
