= Prittriching =

- Municipality
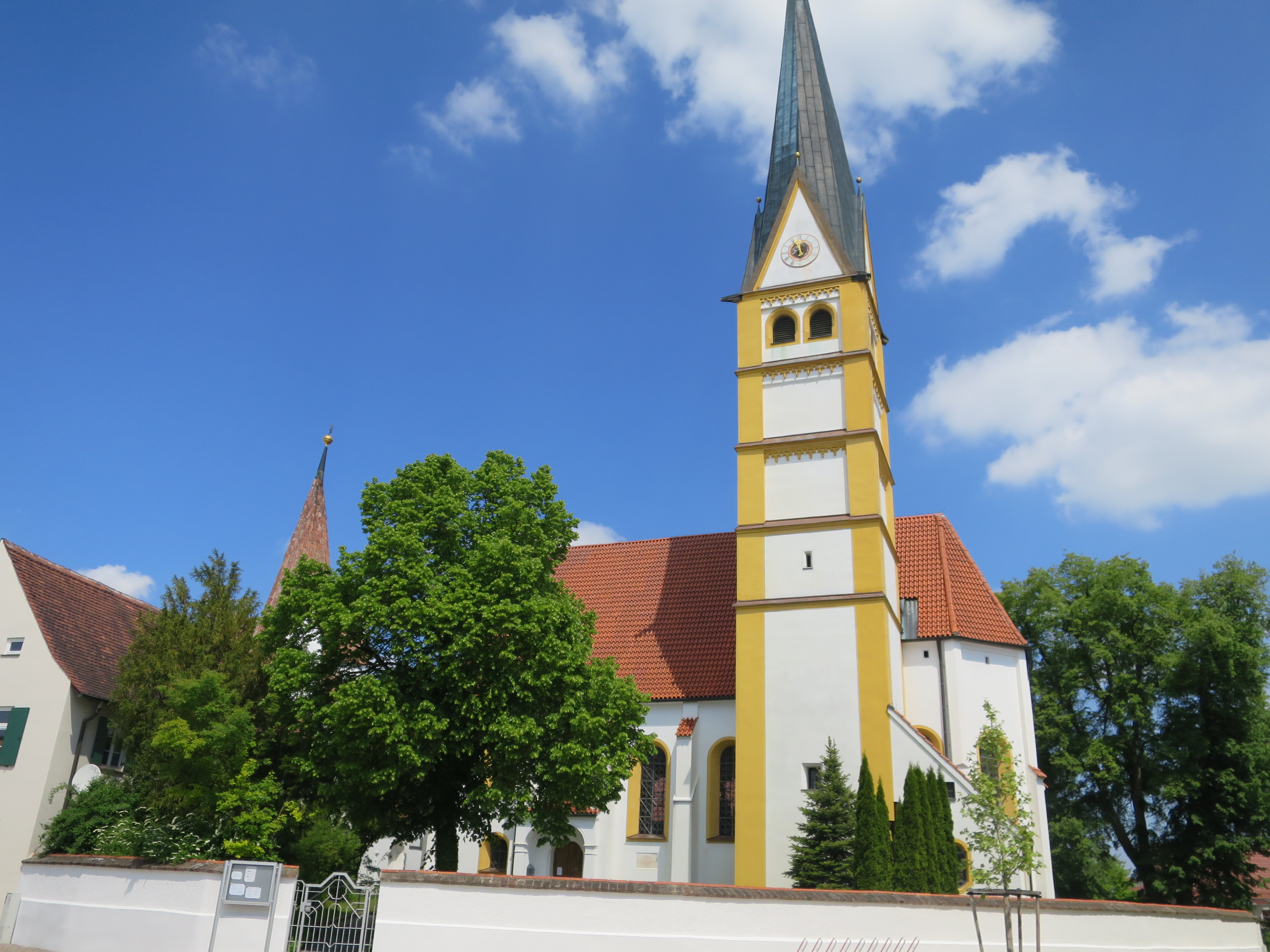
- Church of Our Lady

- Coat of arms

- Location of Prittriching within Landsberg am Lech district
- Interactive map of Prittriching
- Location within Germany Location within Bavaria
- Coordinates: 48°12′N 10°55′E
- Country: Germany
- State: Bavaria
- Admin. region: Oberbayern
- District: Landsberg am Lech
- Municipal assoc.: Prittriching
- Subdivisions: 2 Ortsteile

Government
  - Mayor (2020–26): Alexander Ditsch

Area
  - Total: 25.38 km^{2} (9.80 sq mi)
- Elevation: 551 m (1,808 ft)

Population (2025-12-31)
  - Total: 2,630
  - Density: 104/km^{2} (268/sq mi)
- Time zone: UTC+01:00 (CET)
  - Summer (DST): UTC+02:00 (CEST)
- Postal codes: 86931
- Dialling codes: 08206
- Vehicle registration: LL
- Website: www.prittriching.de

Prittriching (German pronunciation: [ˈpʁɪtʁɪçɪŋ]) is a municipality in the district of Landsberg in Bavaria in Germany.
