= Schwifting =

- Municipality
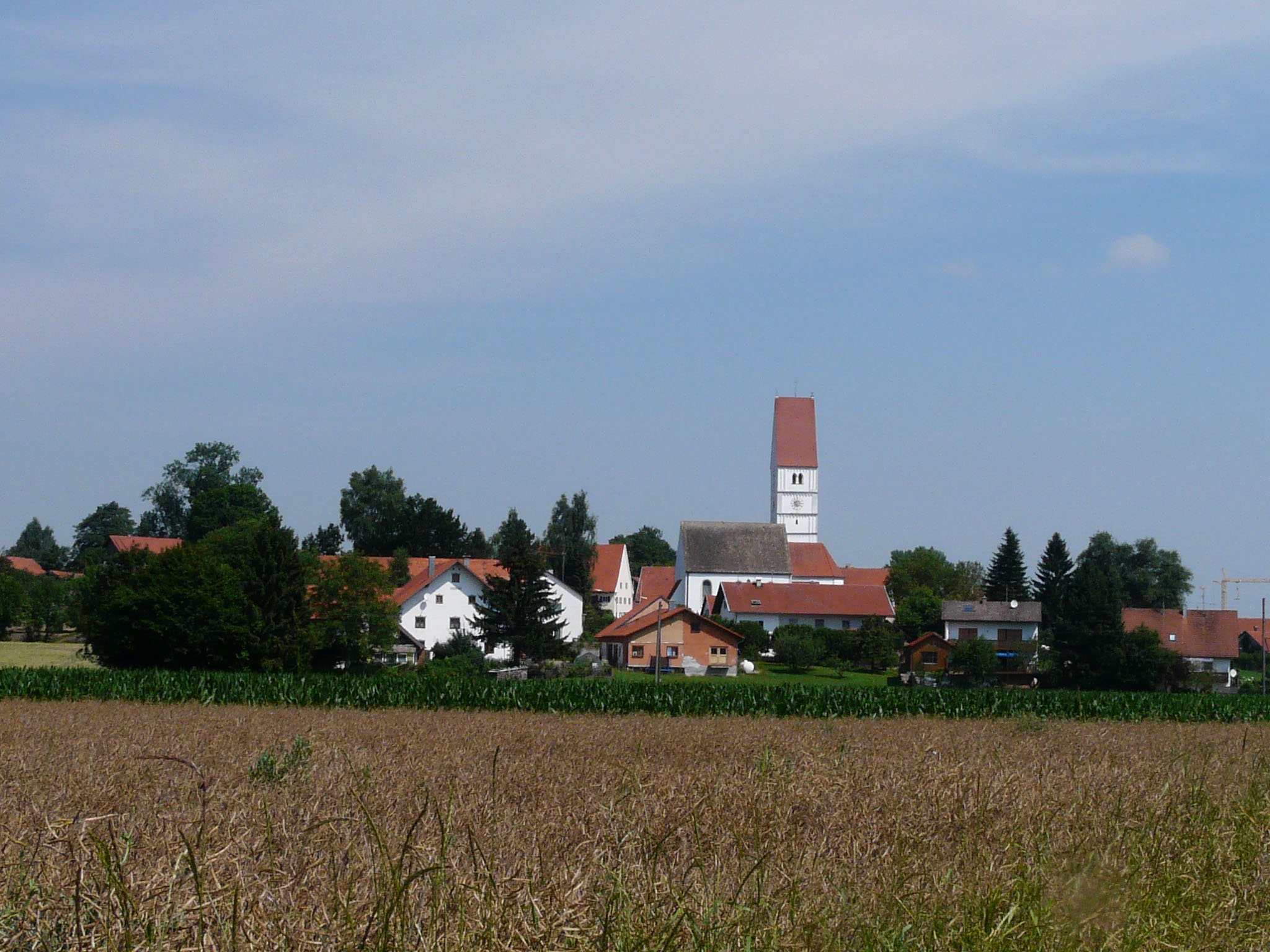
- Schwifting seen from the south

- Coat of arms

- Location of Schwifting within Landsberg am Lech district
- Interactive map of Schwifting
- Location within Germany Location within Bavaria
- Coordinates: 48°2′N 10°55′E
- Country: Germany
- State: Bavaria
- Admin. region: Oberbayern
- District: Landsberg am Lech
- Municipal assoc.: Pürgen

Government
  - Mayor (2020–26): Heike Schappele

Area
  - Total: 11.45 km^{2} (4.42 sq mi)
- Elevation: 631 m (2,070 ft)

Population (2025-12-31)
  - Total: 1,041
  - Density: 90.92/km^{2} (235.5/sq mi)
- Time zone: UTC+01:00 (CET)
  - Summer (DST): UTC+02:00 (CEST)
- Postal codes: 86940
- Dialling codes: 08191
- Vehicle registration: LL
- Website: https://gemeinde-schwifting.de/

Schwifting (German pronunciation: [ˈʃvɪftɪŋ]) is a municipality in the district of Landsberg in Bavaria in Germany.
