= Apfeldorf =

- Municipality
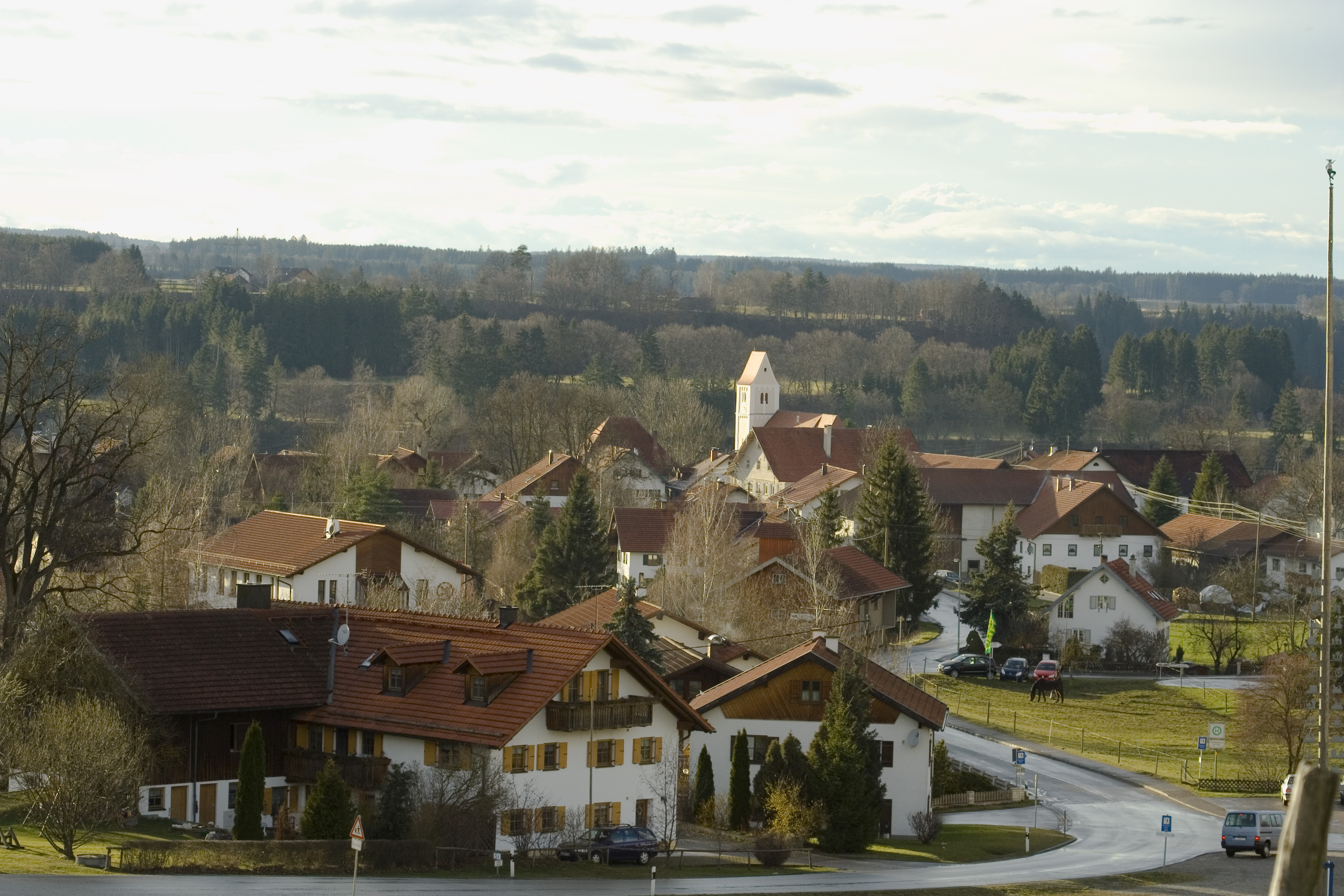
- Apfeldorf

- Coat of arms

- Location of Apfeldorf within Landsberg am Lech district
- Interactive map of Apfeldorf
- Location within Germany Location within Bavaria
- Coordinates: 47°54′N 10°56′E
- Country: Germany
- State: Bavaria
- Admin. region: Oberbayern
- District: Landsberg am Lech
- Municipal assoc.: Reichling

Government
  - Mayor (2020–26): Gerhard Schmid

Area
  - Total: 12.31 km^{2} (4.75 sq mi)
- Elevation: 710 m (2,330 ft)

Population (2025-12-31)
  - Total: 1,240
  - Density: 101/km^{2} (261/sq mi)
- Time zone: UTC+01:00 (CET)
  - Summer (DST): UTC+02:00 (CEST)
- Postal codes: 86974
- Dialling codes: 08869
- Vehicle registration: LL
- Website: www.apfeldorf.de

Apfeldorf (German pronunciation: [ˈapfl̩ˌdɔʁf]) is a municipality in the district of Landsberg in Bavaria in Germany.

== Geography ==
Apfeldorf lies in the middle of the towns of Landsberg am Lech, Schongau and Weilheim, about 40 km north of the northern edge of the Alps, at an altitude of about 660 m ASL. The river Lech flows through the village. Apfeldorf is situated in the Northern Alpine Foreland.

== Landmarks ==
The Church of the Holy Spirit has a Romanesque west tower saddle roof.
