= Thaining =

- Municipality
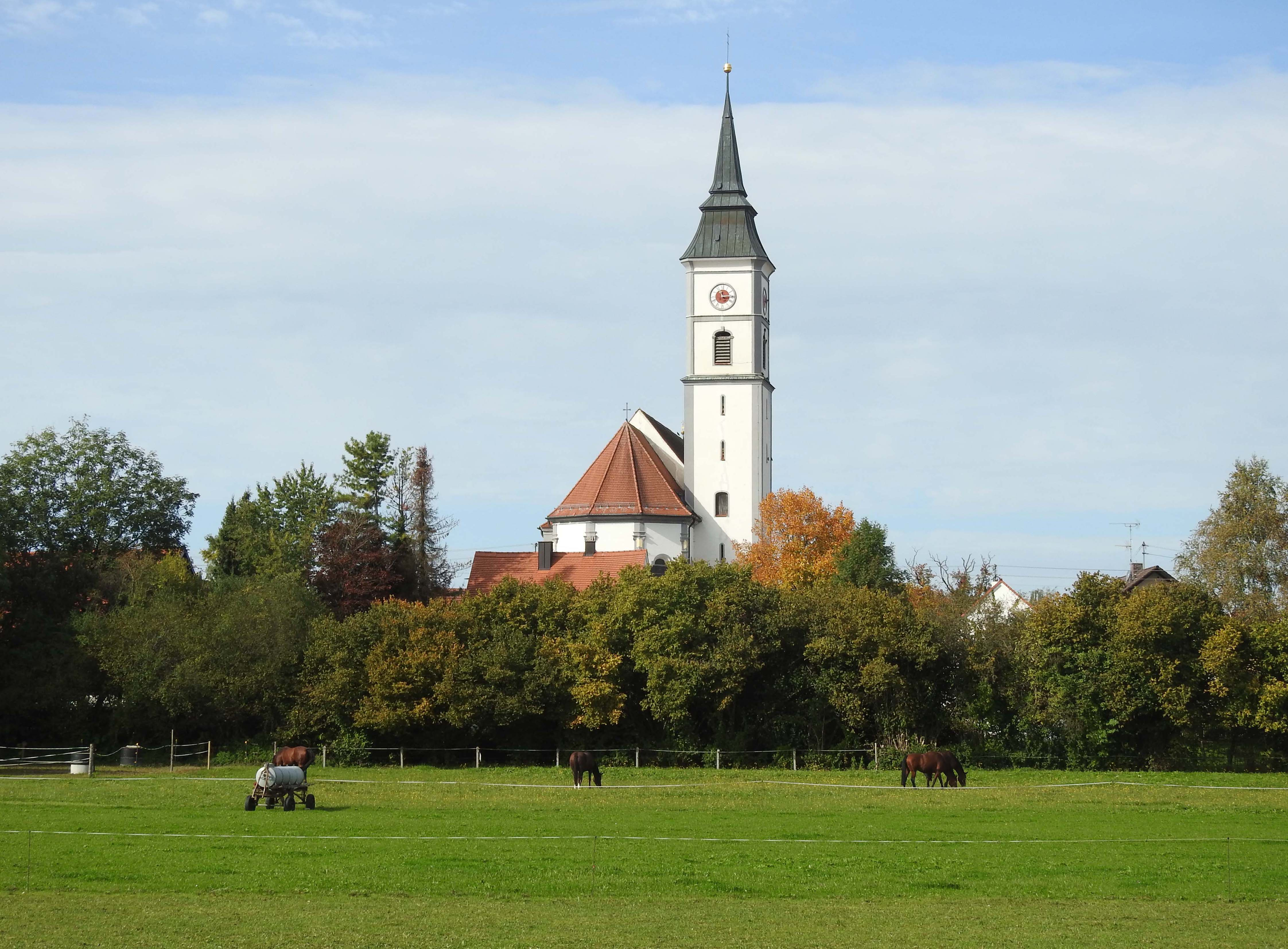
- Church of Saint Martin

- Coat of arms

- Location of Thaining within Landsberg am Lech district
- Interactive map of Thaining
- Location within Germany Location within Bavaria
- Coordinates: 47°57′N 10°58′E
- Country: Germany
- State: Bavaria
- Admin. region: Oberbayern
- District: Landsberg am Lech
- Municipal assoc.: Reichling

Government
  - Mayor (2020–26): Leonhard Stork

Area
  - Total: 8.7 km^{2} (3.4 sq mi)
- Elevation: 692 m (2,270 ft)

Population (2025-12-31)
  - Total: 1,087
  - Density: 120/km^{2} (320/sq mi)
- Time zone: UTC+01:00 (CET)
  - Summer (DST): UTC+02:00 (CEST)
- Postal codes: 86943
- Dialling codes: 08194
- Vehicle registration: LL
- Website: www.thaining.de

Thaining (German pronunciation: [ˈtaɪnɪŋ]) is a municipality in the district of Landsberg in Bavaria in Germany.
