= Windach (Verwaltungsgemeinschaft) =

- Verwaltungsgemeinschaft
- Location of Windach within Landsberg district
- Interactive map of Windach
- Location within Germany Location within Bavaria
- Coordinates: 48°04′N 11°02′E
- Country: Germany
- State: Bavaria
- Admin. region: Upper Bavaria
- District: Landsberg
- Seat: Windach
- Subdivisions: 3 municipalities

Area
  - Total: 62.4 km^{2} (24.1 sq mi)

Population (2025-12-31)
  - Total: 7,786
  - Density: 125/km^{2} (323/sq mi)
- Time zone: UTC+01:00 (CET)
  - Summer (DST): UTC+02:00 (CEST)
- Website: www.vg-windach.de

Windach is a Verwaltungsgemeinschaft (municipal association) in the district of Landsberg am Lech in Bavaria, Germany. Its seat is in Windach. It consists of the following municipalities:

1. Eresing
2. Finning
3. Windach
