= Reichling (Verwaltungsgemeinschaft) =

- Verwaltungsgemeinschaft
- Location of Reichling within Landsberg district
- Interactive map of Reichling
- Location within Germany Location within Bavaria
- Coordinates: 47°55′N 10°56′E
- Country: Germany
- State: Bavaria
- Admin. region: Upper Bavaria
- District: Landsberg
- Seat: Reichling
- Subdivisions: 6 municipalities

Area
  - Total: 102.57 km^{2} (39.60 sq mi)

Population (2025-12-31)
  - Total: 9,726
  - Density: 94.82/km^{2} (245.6/sq mi)
- Time zone: UTC+01:00 (CET)
  - Summer (DST): UTC+02:00 (CEST)
- Website: www.vg-reichling.de

Reichling is a Verwaltungsgemeinschaft (municipal association) in the district of Landsberg am Lech in Bavaria, Germany. Its seat is in Reichling. It consists of the following municipalities:

1. Apfeldorf
2. Kinsau
3. Reichling
4. Rott
5. Thaining
6. Vilgertshofen
