= Pürgen (Verwaltungsgemeinschaft) =

- Verwaltungsgemeinschaft
- Location of Pürgen within Landsberg district
- Interactive map of Pürgen
- Location within Germany Location within Bavaria
- Coordinates: 48°01′N 10°56′E
- Country: Germany
- State: Bavaria
- Admin. region: Upper Bavaria
- District: Landsberg
- Seat: Pürgen
- Subdivisions: 3 municipalities

Area
  - Total: 50.46 km^{2} (19.48 sq mi)

Population (2025-12-31)
  - Total: 6,623
  - Density: 131.3/km^{2} (339.9/sq mi)
- Time zone: UTC+01:00 (CET)
  - Summer (DST): UTC+02:00 (CEST)
- Website: www.vg-puergen.de

Pürgen is a Verwaltungsgemeinschaft (municipal association) in the district of Landsberg am Lech in Bavaria, Germany. Its seat is in Pürgen. It consists of the following municipalities:

1. Hofstetten
2. Pürgen
3. Schwifting
