= Fuchstal =

- Municipality
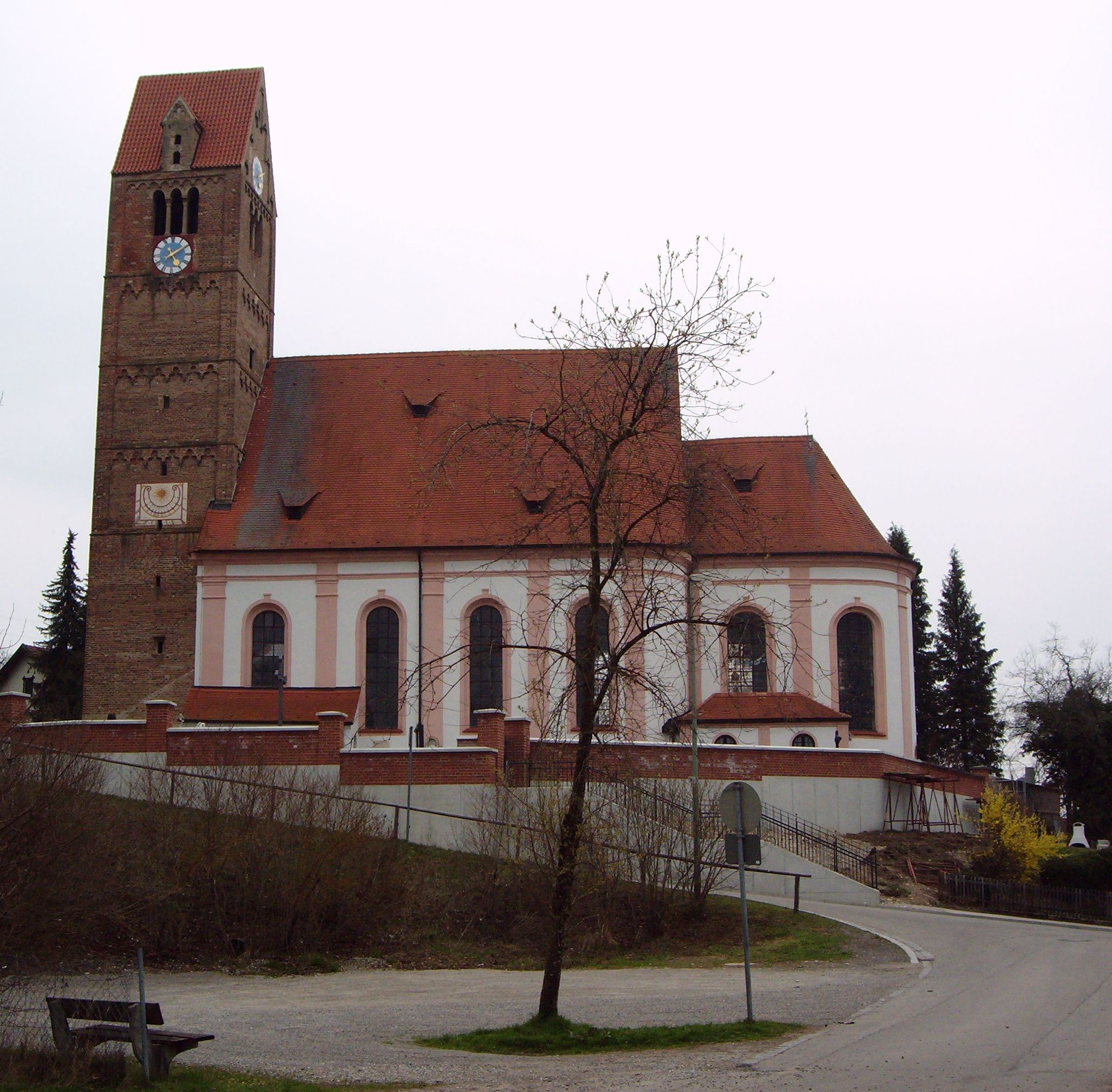
- Church of the Annunciation of the Virgin Mary in Leeder

- Coat of arms

- Location of Fuchstal within Landsberg am Lech district
- Interactive map of Fuchstal
- Location within Germany Location within Bavaria
- Coordinates: 47°56′N 10°49′E
- Country: Germany
- State: Bavaria
- Admin. region: Oberbayern
- District: Landsberg am Lech
- Municipal assoc.: Fuchstal
- Subdivisions: 3 Ortsteile

Government
  - Mayor (2020–26): Erwin Karg

Area
  - Total: 39.74 km^{2} (15.34 sq mi)
- Elevation: 659 m (2,162 ft)

Population (2025-12-31)
  - Total: 4,258
  - Density: 107.1/km^{2} (277.5/sq mi)
- Time zone: UTC+01:00 (CET)
  - Summer (DST): UTC+02:00 (CEST)
- Postal codes: 86925
- Dialling codes: 08243
- Vehicle registration: LL
- Website: www.fuchstal.de

Fuchstal (German pronunciation: [ˈfʊkstaːl]) is a municipality in the district of Landsberg in Bavaria in Germany. It consists of the three villages Leeder (administrative centre), Asch and Seestall.

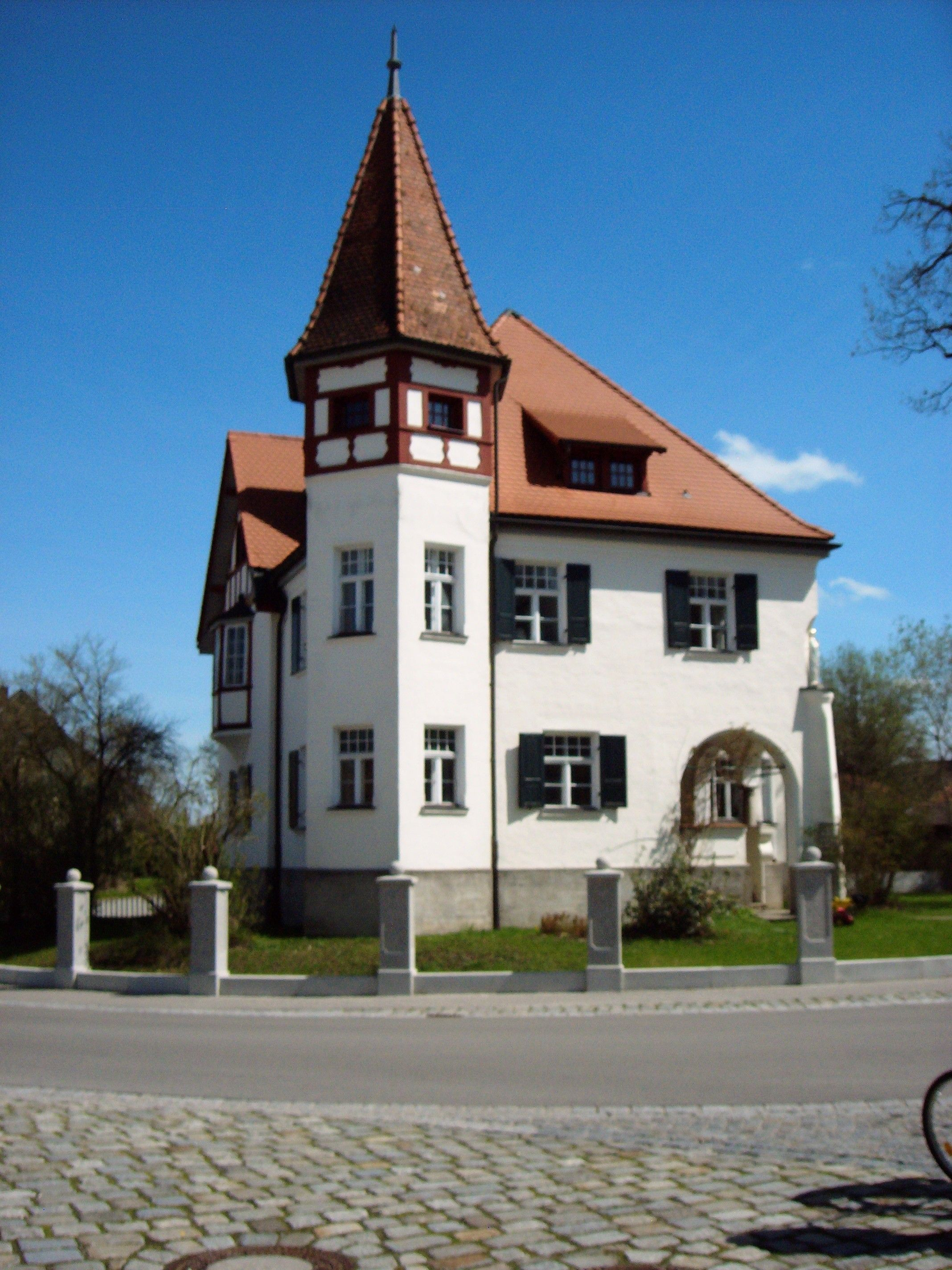
Jugendstil house
