= Rott, Landsberg =

Rott
- Municipality
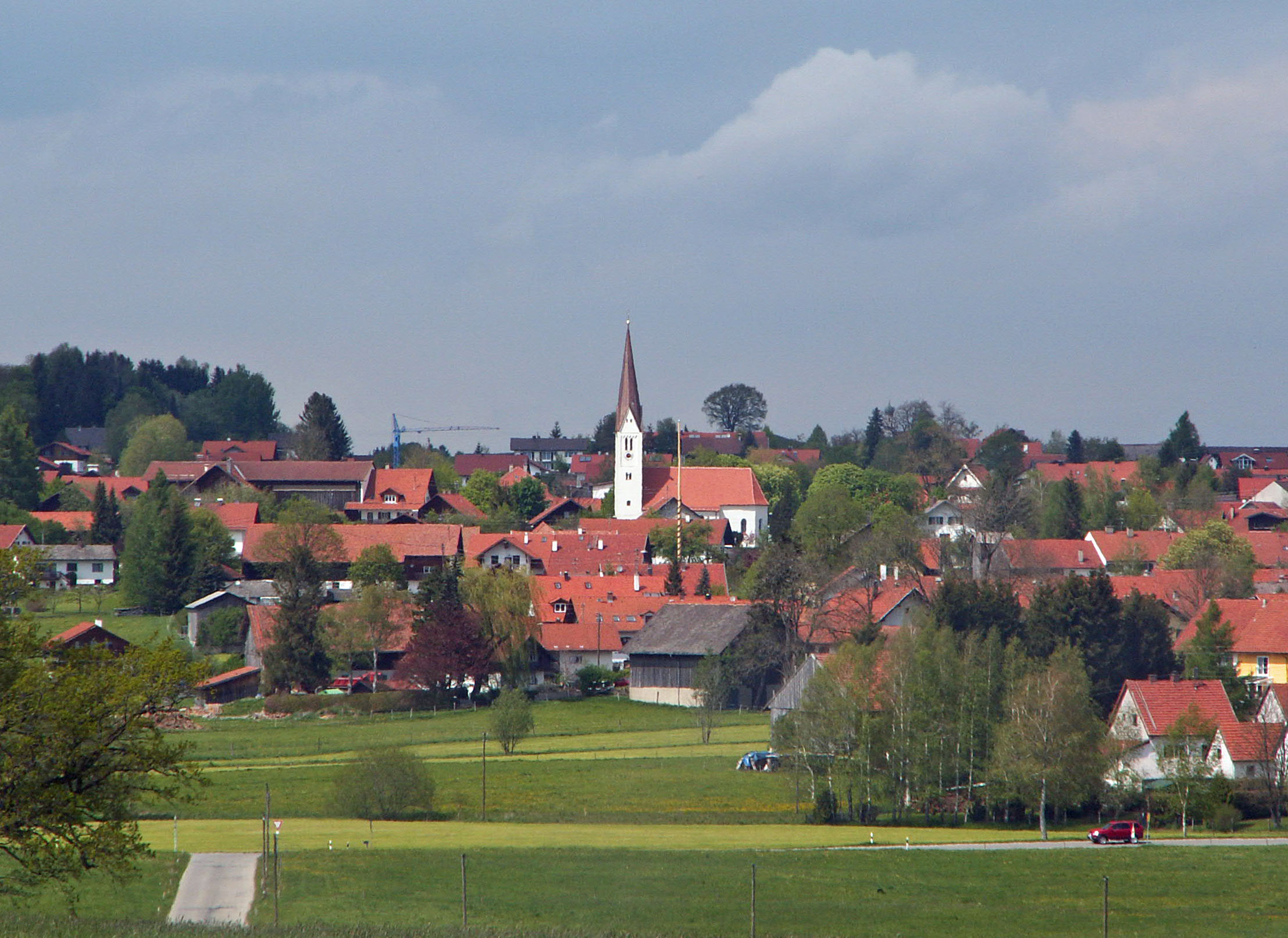
- Rott seen from the south

- Coat of arms

- Location of Rott within Landsberg am Lech district
- Interactive map of Rott
- Location within Germany Location within Bavaria
- Coordinates: 47°54′N 10°58′E
- Country: Germany
- State: Bavaria
- Admin. region: Oberbayern
- District: Landsberg am Lech
- Municipal assoc.: Reichling
- Subdivisions: 2 Ortsteile

Government
  - Mayor (2020–26): Fritz Schneider

Area
  - Total: 19.75 km^{2} (7.63 sq mi)
- Elevation: 702 m (2,303 ft)

Population (2025-12-31)
  - Total: 1,727
  - Density: 87.44/km^{2} (226.5/sq mi)
- Time zone: UTC+01:00 (CET)
  - Summer (DST): UTC+02:00 (CEST)
- Postal codes: 86935
- Dialling codes: 08869
- Vehicle registration: LL
- Website: www.rott-lech.de

Rott (German pronunciation: [ʁɔt]) is a municipality in the district of Landsberg in Bavaria in Germany.
