= Kinsau =

- Municipality
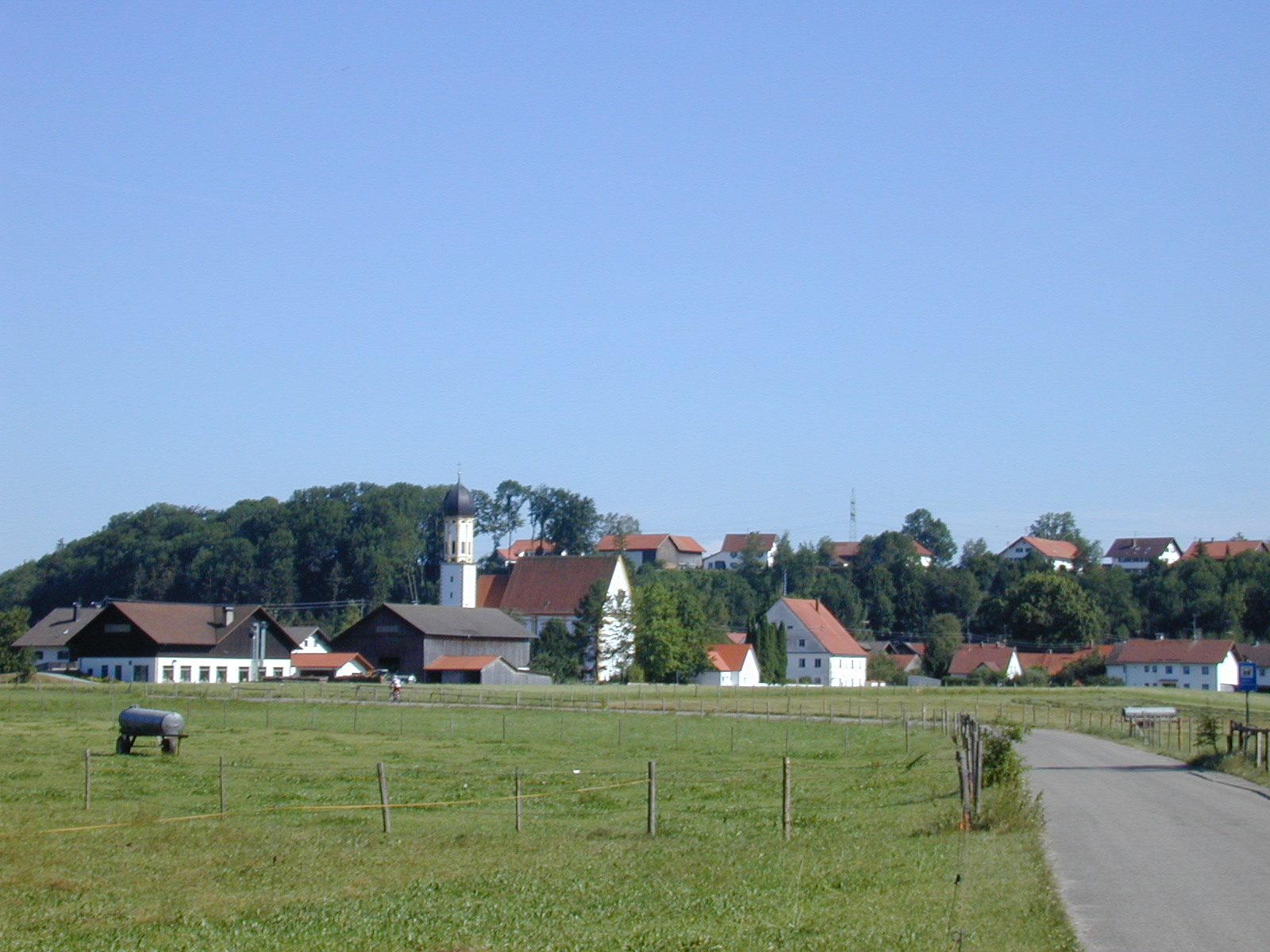
- Kinsau seen from the north

- Coat of arms

- Location of Kinsau within Landsberg am Lech district
- Interactive map of Kinsau
- Location within Germany Location within Bavaria
- Coordinates: 47°53′N 10°55′E
- Country: Germany
- State: Bavaria
- Admin. region: Oberbayern
- District: Landsberg am Lech
- Municipal assoc.: Reichling

Government
  - Mayor (2020–26): Marco Dollinger

Area
  - Total: 11.44 km^{2} (4.42 sq mi)
- Elevation: 664 m (2,178 ft)

Population (2025-12-31)
  - Total: 1,062
  - Density: 92.83/km^{2} (240.4/sq mi)
- Time zone: UTC+01:00 (CET)
  - Summer (DST): UTC+02:00 (CEST)
- Postal codes: 86981
- Dialling codes: 08869
- Vehicle registration: LL
- Website: www.kinsau.de

Kinsau is a municipality in the district of Landsberg in Bavaria in Germany.
