= Finning, Bavaria =

Finning
- Municipality
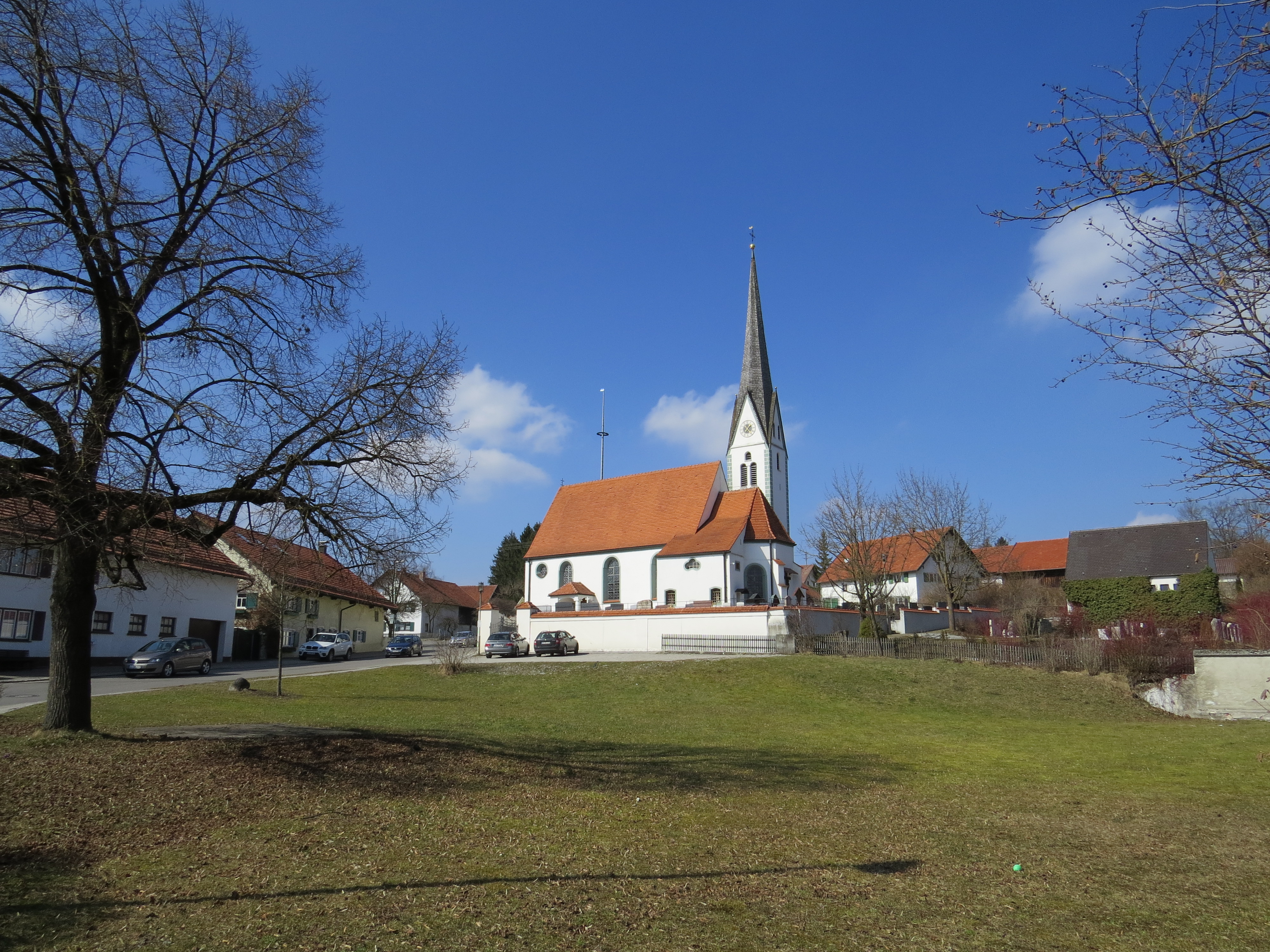
- Church of Our Lady of Sorrows in Unterfinning

- Coat of arms

- Location of Finning within Landsberg am Lech district
- Interactive map of Finning
- Location within Germany Location within Bavaria
- Coordinates: 48°01′N 11°00′E
- Country: Germany
- State: Bavaria
- Admin. region: Oberbayern
- District: Landsberg am Lech
- Municipal assoc.: Windach
- Subdivisions: 3 Ortsteile

Government
  - Mayor (2020–26): Siegfried Weißenbach

Area
  - Total: 23.34 km^{2} (9.01 sq mi)
- Elevation: 609 m (1,998 ft)

Population (2025-12-31)
  - Total: 1,934
  - Density: 82.86/km^{2} (214.6/sq mi)
- Time zone: UTC+01:00 (CET)
  - Summer (DST): UTC+02:00 (CEST)
- Postal codes: 86923
- Dialling codes: 08806
- Vehicle registration: LL
- Website: www.finning.de

Finning (German pronunciation: [ˈfɪnɪŋ]) is a municipality in the district of Landsberg in Bavaria in Germany.
