= Prittriching (Verwaltungsgemeinschaft) =

- Verwaltungsgemeinschaft
- Location of Prittriching within Landsberg district
- Interactive map of Prittriching
- Location within Germany Location within Bavaria
- Coordinates: 48°12′N 10°55′E
- Country: Germany
- State: Bavaria
- Admin. region: Upper Bavaria
- District: Landsberg
- Seat: Prittriching
- Subdivisions: 2 municipalities

Area
  - Total: 46.63 km^{2} (18.00 sq mi)

Population (2025-12-31)
  - Total: 4,614
  - Density: 98.95/km^{2} (256.3/sq mi)
- Time zone: UTC+01:00 (CET)
  - Summer (DST): UTC+02:00 (CEST)
- Website: www.vg-prittriching.eu

Prittriching is a Verwaltungsgemeinschaft (municipal association) in the district of Landsberg am Lech in Bavaria, Germany. Its seat is in Prittriching. It consists of the following municipalities:

1. Prittriching
2. Scheuring
