= Fuchstal (Verwaltungsgemeinschaft) =

- Verwaltungsgemeinschaft
- Location of Fuchstal within Landsberg district
- Interactive map of Fuchstal
- Location within Germany Location within Bavaria
- Coordinates: 47°56′N 10°49′E
- Country: Germany
- State: Bavaria
- Admin. region: Upper Bavaria
- District: Landsberg
- Seat: Fuchstal
- Subdivisions: 2 municipalities

Area
  - Total: 52.52 km^{2} (20.28 sq mi)

Population (2025-12-31)
  - Total: 5,774
  - Density: 109.9/km^{2} (284.7/sq mi)
- Time zone: UTC+01:00 (CET)
  - Summer (DST): UTC+02:00 (CEST)
- Website: www.vgem-fuchstal.de

Fuchstal is a Verwaltungsgemeinschaft (municipal association) in the district of Landsberg am Lech in Bavaria, Germany. Its seat is in Fuchstal. It consists of the following municipalities:

1. Fuchstal
2. Unterdießen
