= Vilgertshofen =

- Municipality
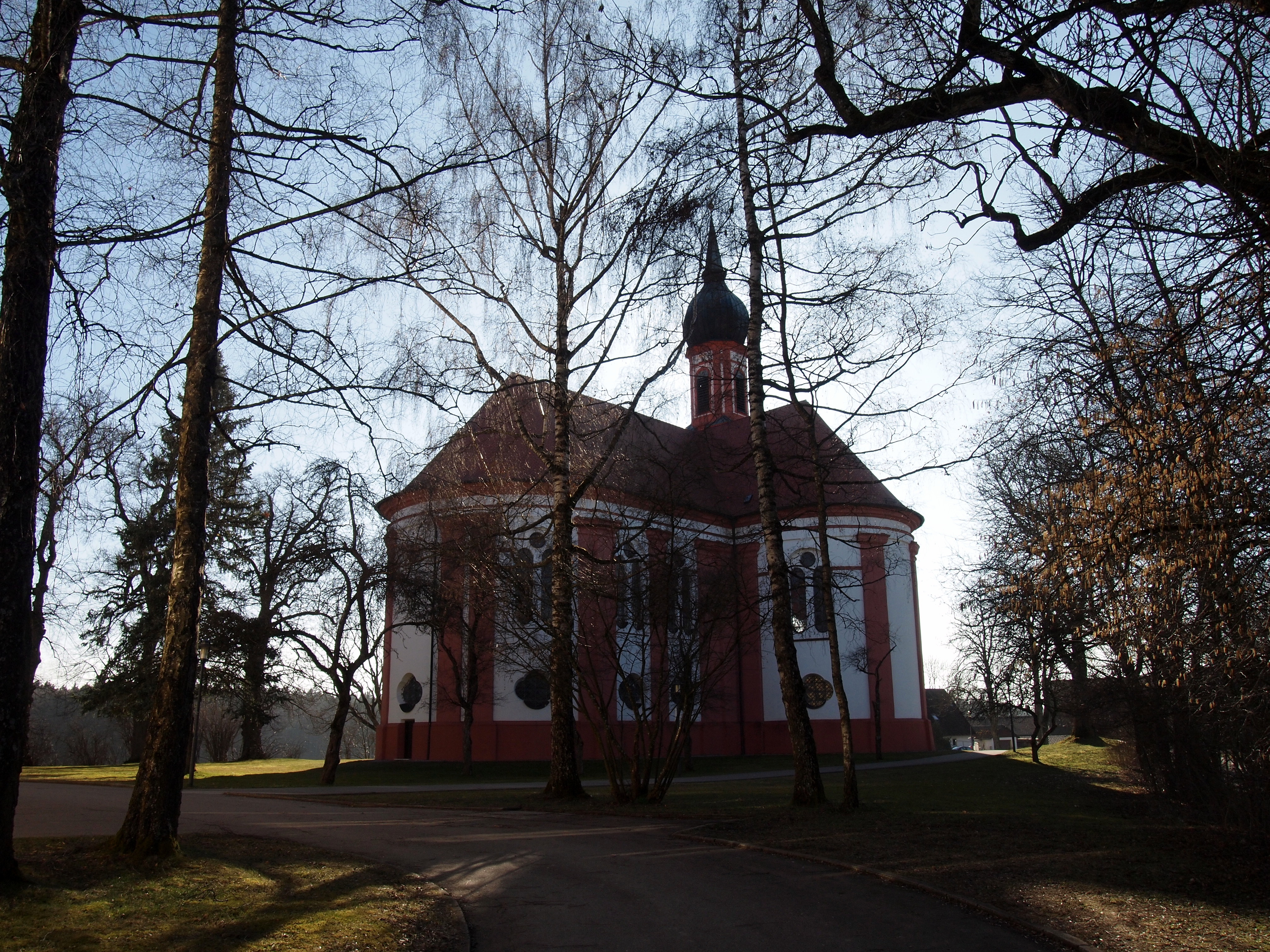
- Pilgrimage Church of Our Lady of Sorrows

- Coat of arms

- Location of Vilgertshofen within Landsberg am Lech district
- Interactive map of Vilgertshofen
- Location within Germany Location within Bavaria
- Coordinates: 47°57′N 10°55′E
- Country: Germany
- State: Bavaria
- Admin. region: Oberbayern
- District: Landsberg am Lech
- Municipal assoc.: Reichling
- Subdivisions: 5 Ortsteile

Government
  - Mayor (2020–26): Albert Thurner

Area
  - Total: 27.14 km^{2} (10.48 sq mi)
- Elevation: 714 m (2,343 ft)

Population (2025-12-31)
  - Total: 2,856
  - Density: 105.2/km^{2} (272.5/sq mi)
- Time zone: UTC+01:00 (CET)
  - Summer (DST): UTC+02:00 (CEST)
- Postal codes: 86946
- Dialling codes: 08194
- Vehicle registration: LL
- Website: https://www.vilgertshofen.de/

Vilgertshofen is a municipality in the district of Landsberg in Bavaria in Germany.
