= Weil, Bavaria =

Weil
- Municipality
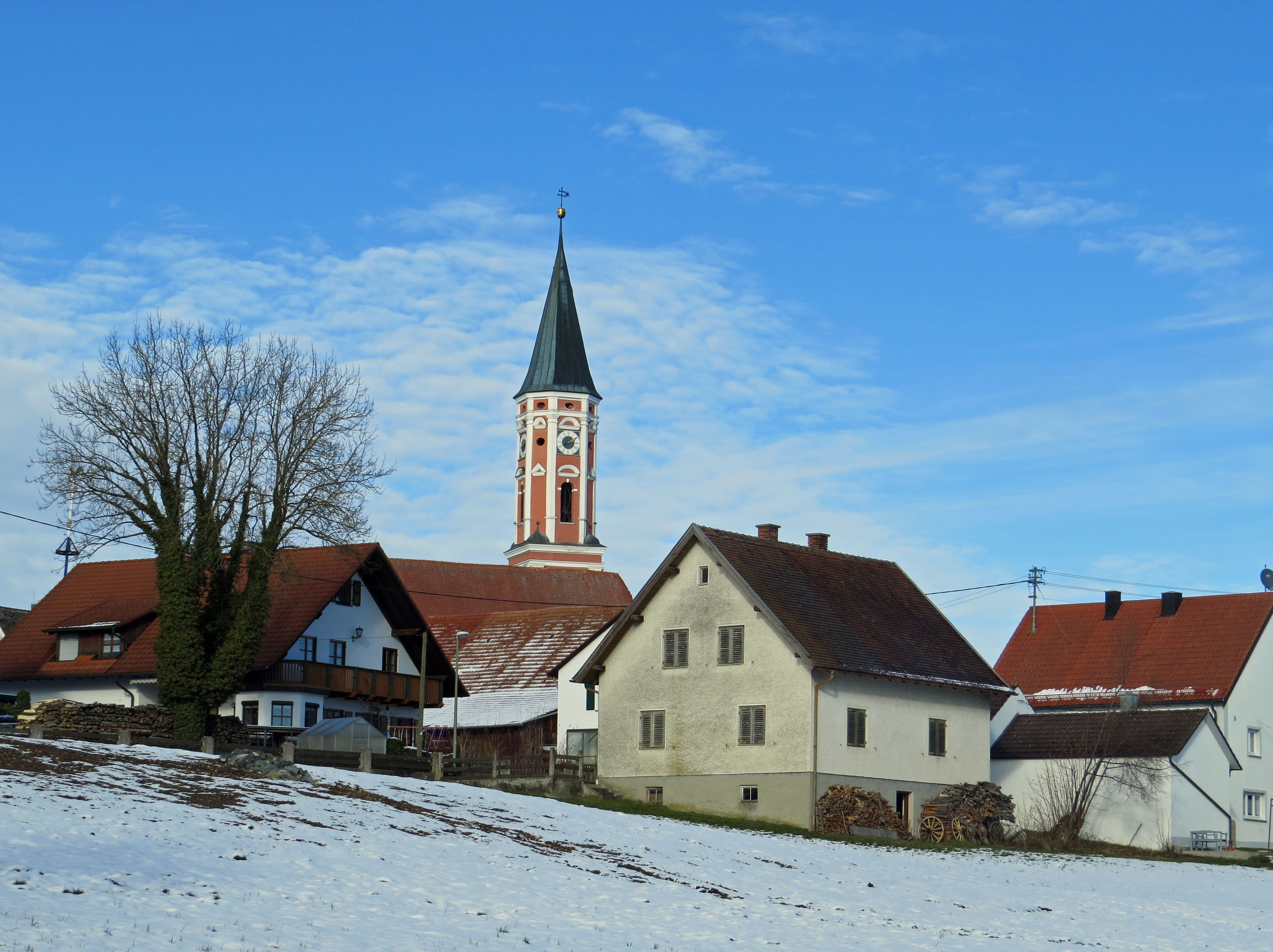
- Weil seen from the south

- Coat of arms

- Location of Weil within Landsberg am Lech district
- Interactive map of Weil
- Location within Germany Location within Bavaria
- Coordinates: 48°07′N 10°55′E
- Country: Germany
- State: Bavaria
- Admin. region: Oberbayern
- District: Landsberg am Lech
- Subdivisions: 6 Ortsteile

Government
  - Mayor (2020–26): Christian Bolz

Area
  - Total: 44.48 km^{2} (17.17 sq mi)
- Elevation: 587 m (1,926 ft)

Population (2025-12-31)
  - Total: 3,995
  - Density: 89.82/km^{2} (232.6/sq mi)
- Time zone: UTC+01:00 (CET)
  - Summer (DST): UTC+02:00 (CEST)
- Postal codes: 86947
- Dialling codes: 08195
- Vehicle registration: LL
- Website: https://www.weil.de/

Weil (German pronunciation: [vaɪl]) is a municipality in the district of Landsberg in Bavaria in Germany.

== World Heritage Site ==
It is home to one or more prehistoric pile-dwelling (or stilt house) settlements that are part of the Prehistoric Pile dwellings around the Alps UNESCO World Heritage Site.
