= Landsberg (district) =

Coordinates: 48°00′N 10°55′E

Landsberg am Lech
- District
- Flag Coat of arms
- Country: Germany
- State: Bavaria
- Adm. region: Upper Bavaria
- Capital: Landsberg

Government
  - District admin.: David Höfler (Junge Liberale)

Area
  - Total: 804.38 km^{2} (310.57 sq mi)

Population (31 December 2025)
  - Total: 122,307
  - Density: 152.05/km^{2} (393.81/sq mi)
- Time zone: UTC+01:00 (CET)
  - Summer (DST): UTC+02:00 (CEST)
- Vehicle registration: LL
- Website: landkreis-landsberg.de

Landsberg am Lech is a Landkreis (district) in Bavaria, Germany. It is bounded by (from the north and clockwise) the districts of Aichach-Friedberg, Fürstenfeldbruck, Starnberg, Weilheim-Schongau, Ostallgäu and Augsburg.

== History ==
In 1180 the lands east of the Lech river fell to the Wittelsbach dynasty of Bavaria; the lands on the western bank were acquired about 1315.

The district of Landsberg was established in 1938 as the successor of another entity (Bezirksamt) of the same name. In the administrative reform of 1972 the district received its present shape.

In the final stages of World War II, the German Armaments Ministry and the SS established the Kaufering concentration camp, including 11 subcamps in the general area of Landsberg and Kaufering. It was set up as a subcamp of Dachau. At the end of April 1945, the SS evacuated or destroyed what they could before the Allies arrived. A dramatization of the discovery and liberation of the camp was presented in Episode 9: Why We Fight of the Band of Brothers mini-series in the year 2001. The historical information, film and photographic material were given by Anton Posset to the film producer Steven Spielberg and Tom Hanks.

== Geography ==
=== State ===
The administrative district lies in the west of Upper Bavaria and borders there on the administrative district Swabia (Bavaria). It comprises 31 municipalities with a total area of 804 km². The district is dominated by the Lech with its numerous barrages, the Ammersee, the rural communities in the south reaching as far as the foothills of the Alps and the large district town of Landsberg am Lech situated at the junction of the Bundesautobahn 96 (Munich-Lindau) with the Bundesstraße 17 (Augsburg-Füssen-Austria). The lowest point is Unterbergen (521 metres), the highest is Sachsenrieder Forst near Dietlried (853 metres).

The district has a share in the natural areas of Lechfeld, Ammersee and Pfaffenwinkel.

=== Land use ===
Settlement and traffic areas in the district account for 11.1% of the total area. Agricultural land accounts for 82.2% of the total area of the district, 54.2% of which is agricultural land and 28% forest land. While the north of the district is relatively poor in forests, the southern part has a high proportion of forest areas and large closed forest areas, such as the Sachsenrieder Forst and the Forst Bayerdießen.

=== Language border ===
The Bavarian-Alemannic language border runs through the district, essentially along the Lech. Within a few kilometers there are often clear differences in the local dialect.

The Lechrainer dialect is characteristic of the district.

=== Neighbouring districts ===
The administrative district borders clockwise in the north beginning with the administrative districts Aichach-Friedberg, Fürstenfeldbruck, Starnberg, Weilheim-Schongau, Ostallgäu and Augsburg.

== Coat of arms ==
The coat of arms displays:

- the blue and white checked pattern of Bavaria
- the eagle was the heraldic animal of the county of Dießen-Andechs, which possessed the lands east of the Lech river before the 12th century
- the lion stands for Henry the Lion, who was the founder of the city of Landsberg

== Towns and municipalities ==
Clickable map of towns and municipalities in the district

Towns
1. Landsberg am Lech
Märkte
1. Dießen am Ammersee
2. Kaufering
Municipalities
1. Denklingen
2. Egling an der Paar
3. Geltendorf
4. Penzing
5. Unterdießen
6. Utting am Ammersee
7. Weil

Verwaltungsgemeinschaften
1. Fuchstal; 1. Fuchstal^{1}; 2. Unterdießen; 2. Igling; 1. Hurlach; 2. Igling^{1}; 3. Obermeitingen	3. Prittriching; 1. Prittriching^{1}; 2. Scheuring; 4. Pürgen; 1. Hofstetten; 2. Pürgen^{1}; 3. Schwifting	5. Reichling; 1. Apfeldorf; 2. Kinsau; 3. Reichling^{1}; 4. Rott; 5. Thaining; 6. Vilgertshofen	5. Schondorf; 1. Eching am Ammersee; 2. Greifenberg; 3. Schondorf^{1}; 6. Windach; 1. Eresing; 2. Finning; 3. Windach^{1}
^{1}seat of the Verwaltungsgemeinschaft
