= Reichling =

- Municipality
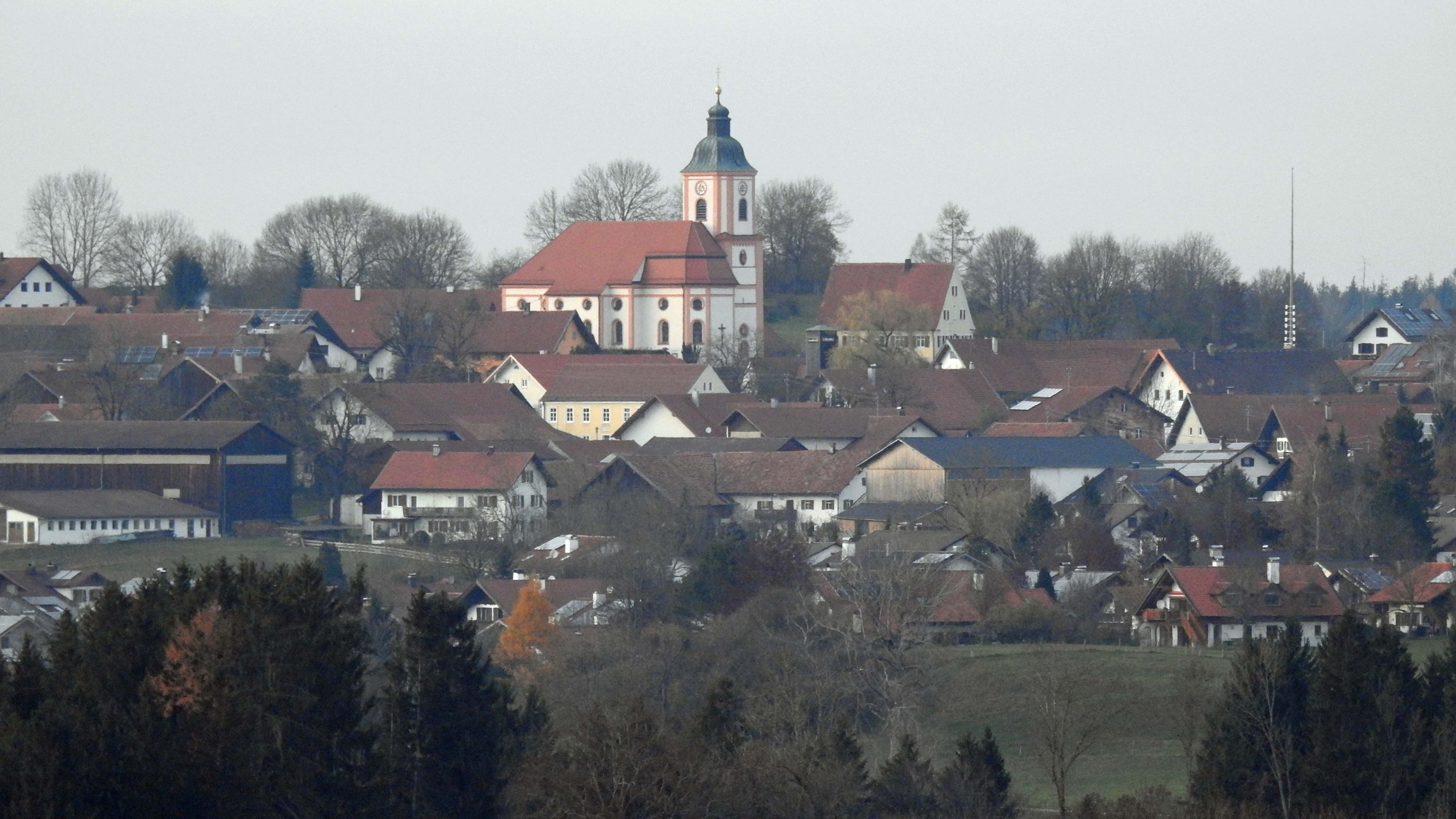
- Reichling seen from the southeast

- Coat of arms

- Location of Reichling within Landsberg am Lech district
- Interactive map of Reichling
- Location within Germany Location within Bavaria
- Coordinates: 47°55′N 10°56′E
- Country: Germany
- State: Bavaria
- Admin. region: Oberbayern
- District: Landsberg am Lech
- Municipal assoc.: Reichling
- Subdivisions: 4 Ortsteile

Government
  - Mayor (2020–26): Johannes Hintersberger

Area
  - Total: 23.26 km^{2} (8.98 sq mi)
- Elevation: 731 m (2,398 ft)

Population (2025-12-31)
  - Total: 1,754
  - Density: 75.41/km^{2} (195.3/sq mi)
- Time zone: UTC+01:00 (CET)
  - Summer (DST): UTC+02:00 (CEST)
- Postal codes: 86934
- Dialling codes: 08194
- Vehicle registration: LL
- Website: www.gemeinde-reichling.de

Reichling (German pronunciation: [ˈʁaɪçlɪŋ]) is a municipality in the district of Landsberg in Bavaria in Germany.
