= Windach =

- Municipality
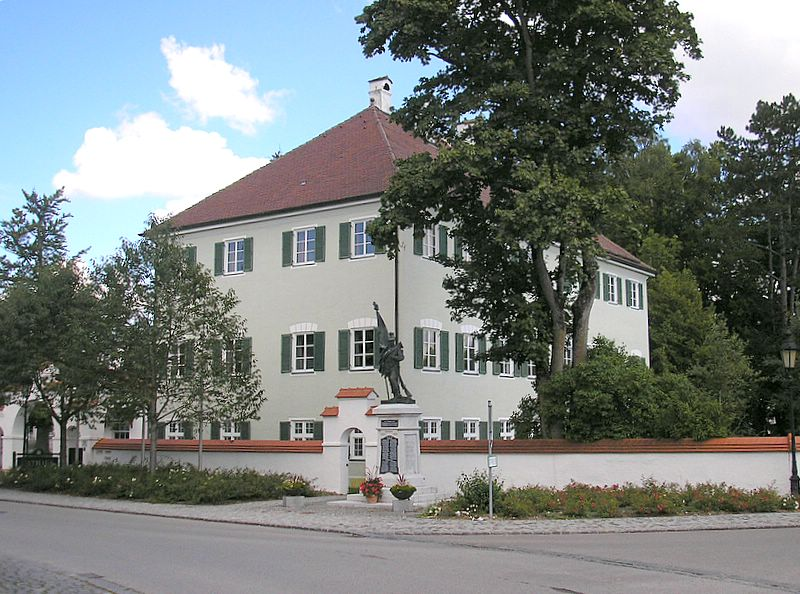
- Windach Castle

- Coat of arms

- Location of Windach within Landsberg am Lech district
- Interactive map of Windach
- Location within Germany Location within Bavaria
- Coordinates: 48°04′N 11°02′E
- Country: Germany
- State: Bavaria
- Admin. region: Oberbayern
- District: Landsberg am Lech
- Municipal assoc.: Windach
- Subdivisions: 4 Ortsteile

Government
  - Mayor (2020–26): Richard Michl

Area
  - Total: 24.84 km^{2} (9.59 sq mi)
- Elevation: 565–590 m (1,854–1,936 ft)

Population (2025-12-31)
  - Total: 3,772
  - Density: 151.9/km^{2} (393.3/sq mi)
- Time zone: UTC+01:00 (CET)
  - Summer (DST): UTC+02:00 (CEST)
- Postal codes: 86949
- Dialling codes: 08193
- Vehicle registration: LL
- Website: www.windach.de

Windach (German pronunciation: [ˈvɪndax]) is a municipality in the district of Landsberg in Bavaria in Germany. As of December 2022, the municipality's population was 3,847.
