= Unterdießen =

- Municipality
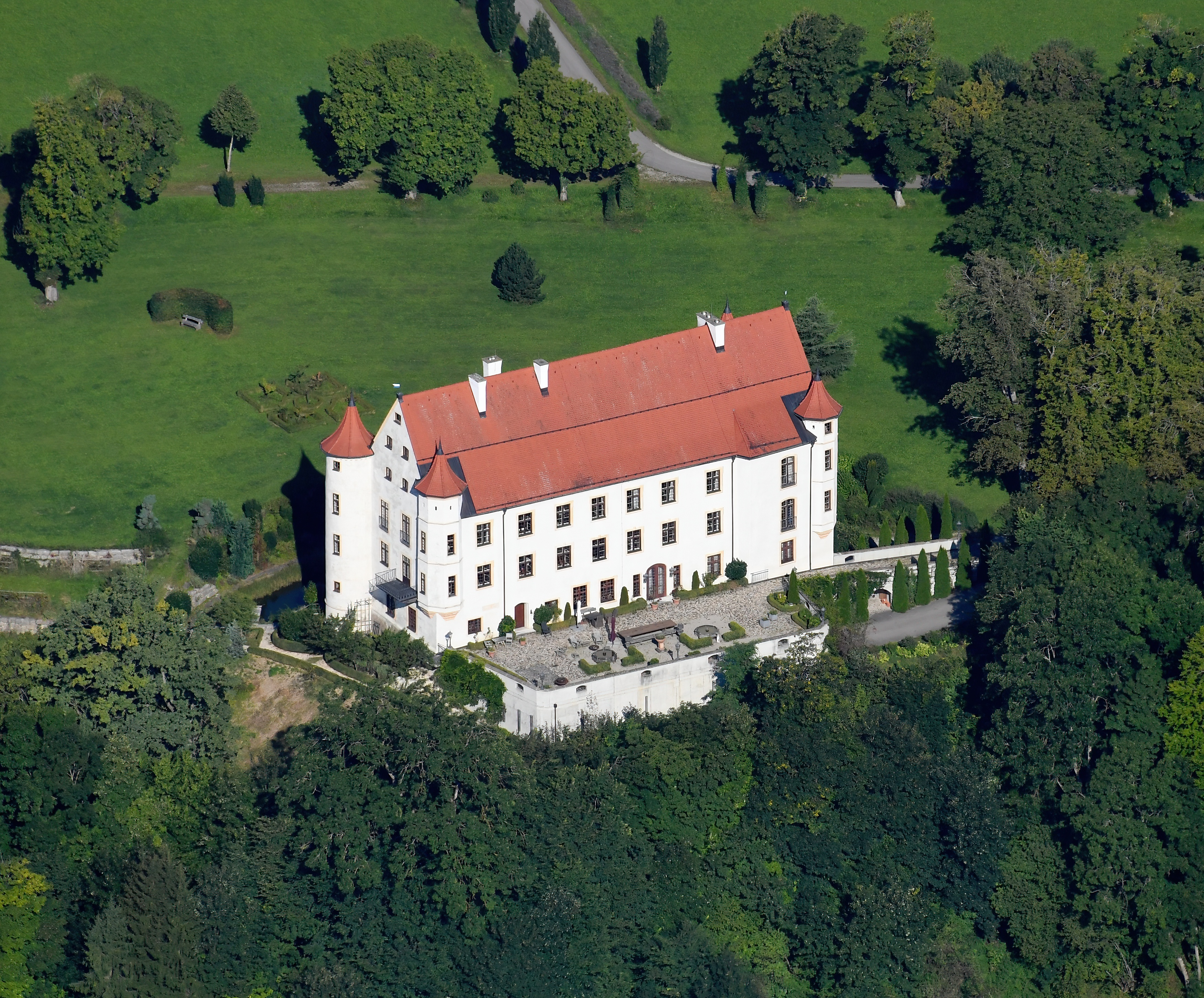
- Unterdießen Castle

- Coat of arms

- Location of Unterdießen within Landsberg am Lech district
- Interactive map of Unterdießen
- Location within Germany Location within Bavaria
- Coordinates: 47°59′N 10°50′E
- Country: Germany
- State: Bavaria
- Admin. region: Oberbayern
- District: Landsberg am Lech
- Municipal assoc.: Fuchstal
- Subdivisions: 3 Ortsteile

Government
  - Mayor (2020–26): Alexander Enthofer

Area
  - Total: 12.79 km^{2} (4.94 sq mi)
- Elevation: 610–644 m (2,001–2,113 ft)

Population (2025-12-31)
  - Total: 1,516
  - Density: 118.5/km^{2} (307.0/sq mi)
- Time zone: UTC+01:00 (CET)
  - Summer (DST): UTC+02:00 (CEST)
- Postal codes: 86944
- Dialling codes: 08243
- Vehicle registration: LL
- Website: www.unterdiessen.de

Unterdießen is a municipality in the district of Landsberg in Bavaria in Germany. It is located just west of the river Lech.
