= Scheuring =

- Municipality
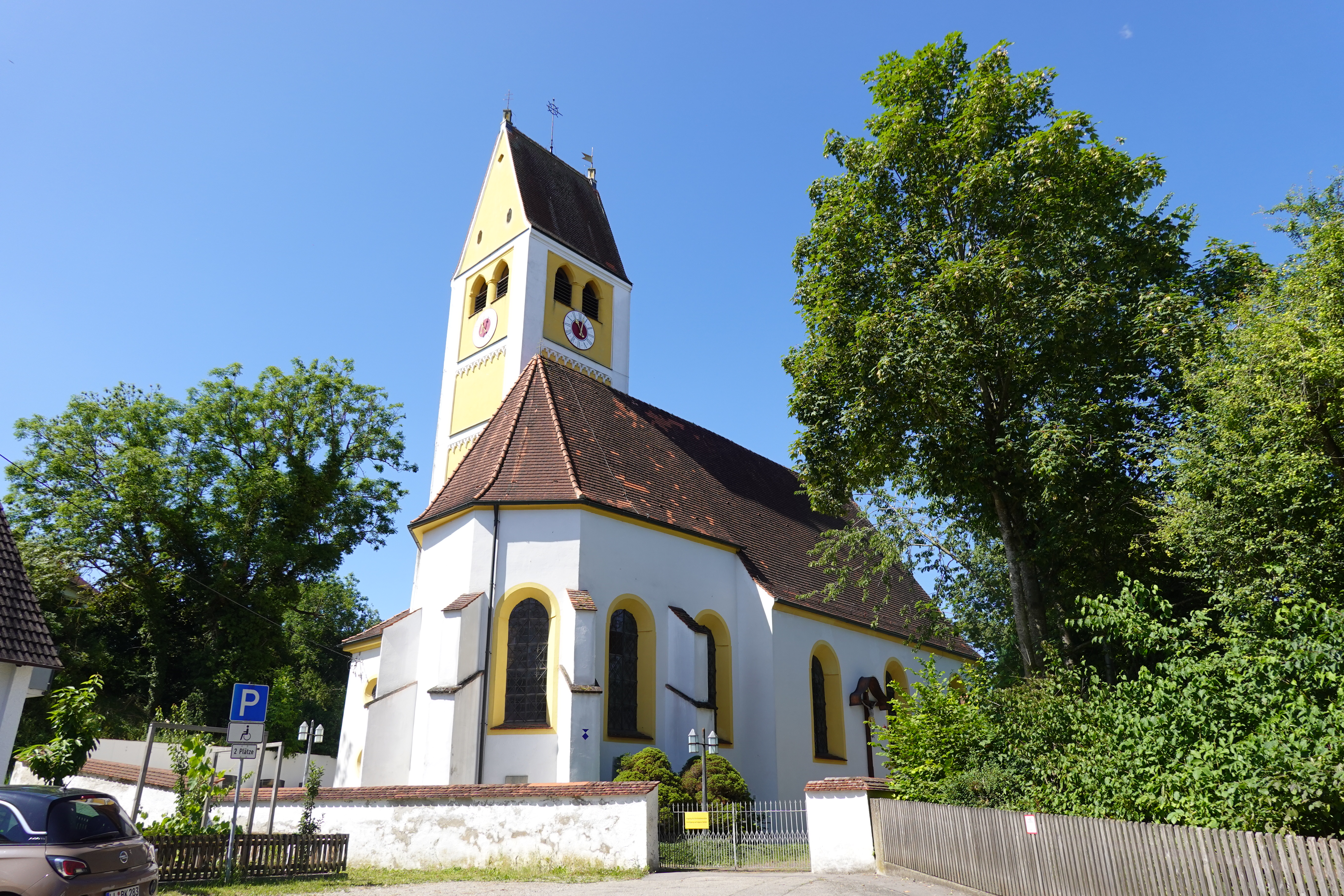
- Church of Saint Martin

- Coat of arms

- Location of Scheuring within Landsberg am Lech district
- Interactive map of Scheuring
- Location within Germany Location within Bavaria
- Coordinates: 48°10′N 10°54′E
- Country: Germany
- State: Bavaria
- Admin. region: Oberbayern
- District: Landsberg am Lech
- Municipal assoc.: Prittriching

Government
  - Mayor (2020–26): Konrad Maisterl

Area
  - Total: 21.25 km^{2} (8.20 sq mi)
- Elevation: 564 m (1,850 ft)

Population (2025-12-31)
  - Total: 1,984
  - Density: 93.36/km^{2} (241.8/sq mi)
- Time zone: UTC+01:00 (CET)
  - Summer (DST): UTC+02:00 (CEST)
- Postal codes: 86937
- Dialling codes: 08195
- Vehicle registration: LL
- Website: https://www.scheuring.eu/

Scheuring (German pronunciation: [ˈʃɔʏʁɪŋ]) is a municipality in the district of Landsberg in Bavaria in Germany.
