= Hofstetten, Bavaria =

Hofstetten
- Municipality
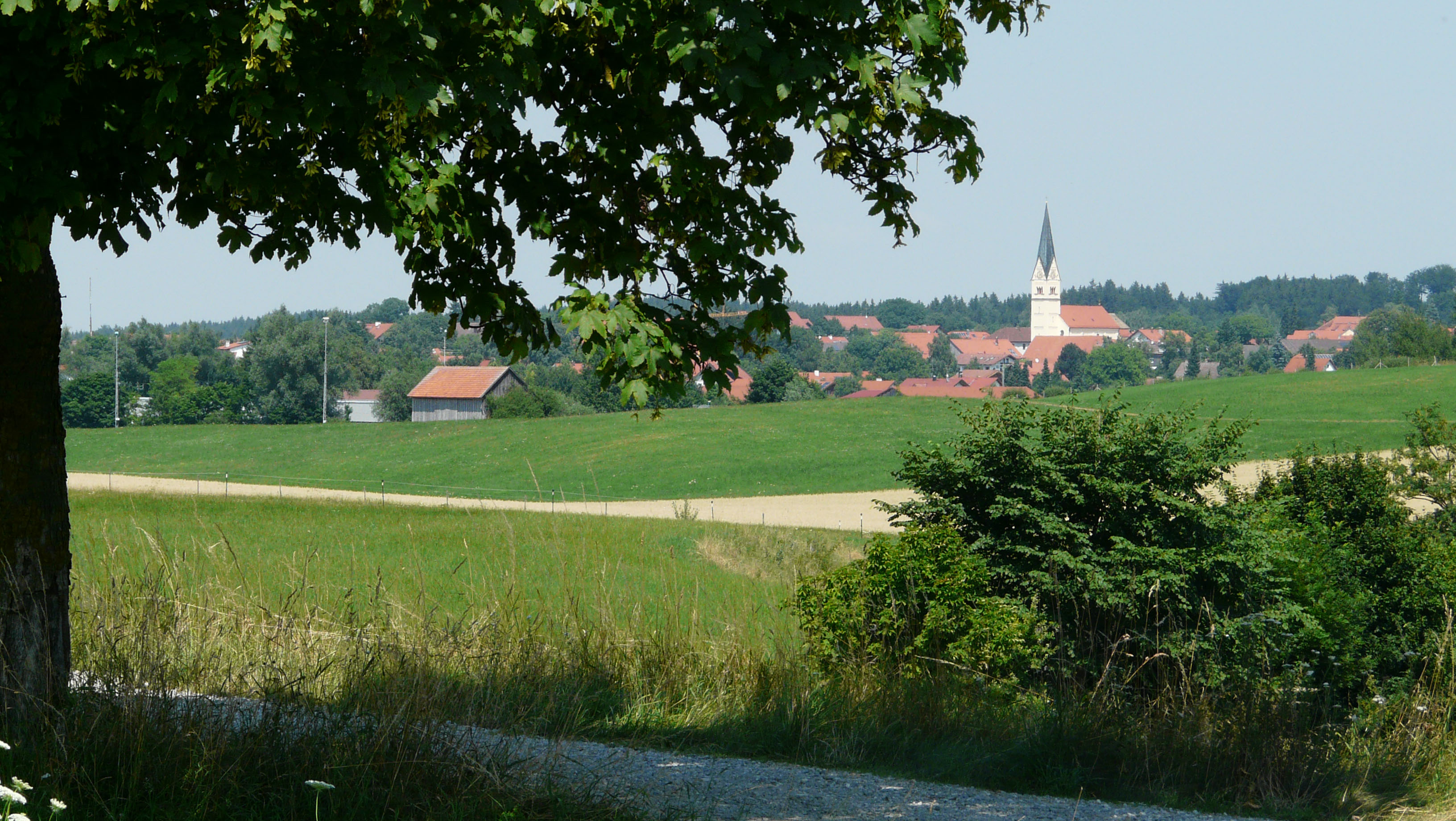
- View towards the village

- Coat of arms

- Location of Hofstetten within Landsberg am Lech district
- Interactive map of Hofstetten
- Location within Germany Location within Bavaria
- Coordinates: 48°01′N 10°58′E
- Country: Germany
- State: Bavaria
- Admin. region: Oberbayern
- District: Landsberg am Lech
- Municipal assoc.: Pürgen
- Subdivisions: 2 Ortsteile

Government
  - Mayor (2020–26): Ulrike Högenauer

Area
  - Total: 17.02 km^{2} (6.57 sq mi)
- Elevation: 676 m (2,218 ft)

Population (2025-12-31)
  - Total: 1,842
  - Density: 108.2/km^{2} (280.3/sq mi)
- Time zone: UTC+01:00 (CET)
  - Summer (DST): UTC+02:00 (CEST)
- Postal codes: 86928
- Dialling codes: 08196
- Vehicle registration: LL
- Website: https://hofstetten-hagenheim.de/

Hofstetten (German pronunciation: [hoːfˈʃtɛtn̩]) is a municipality in the district of Landsberg in Bavaria in Germany. It has 1759 inhabitants.
