= Pürgen =

- Municipality
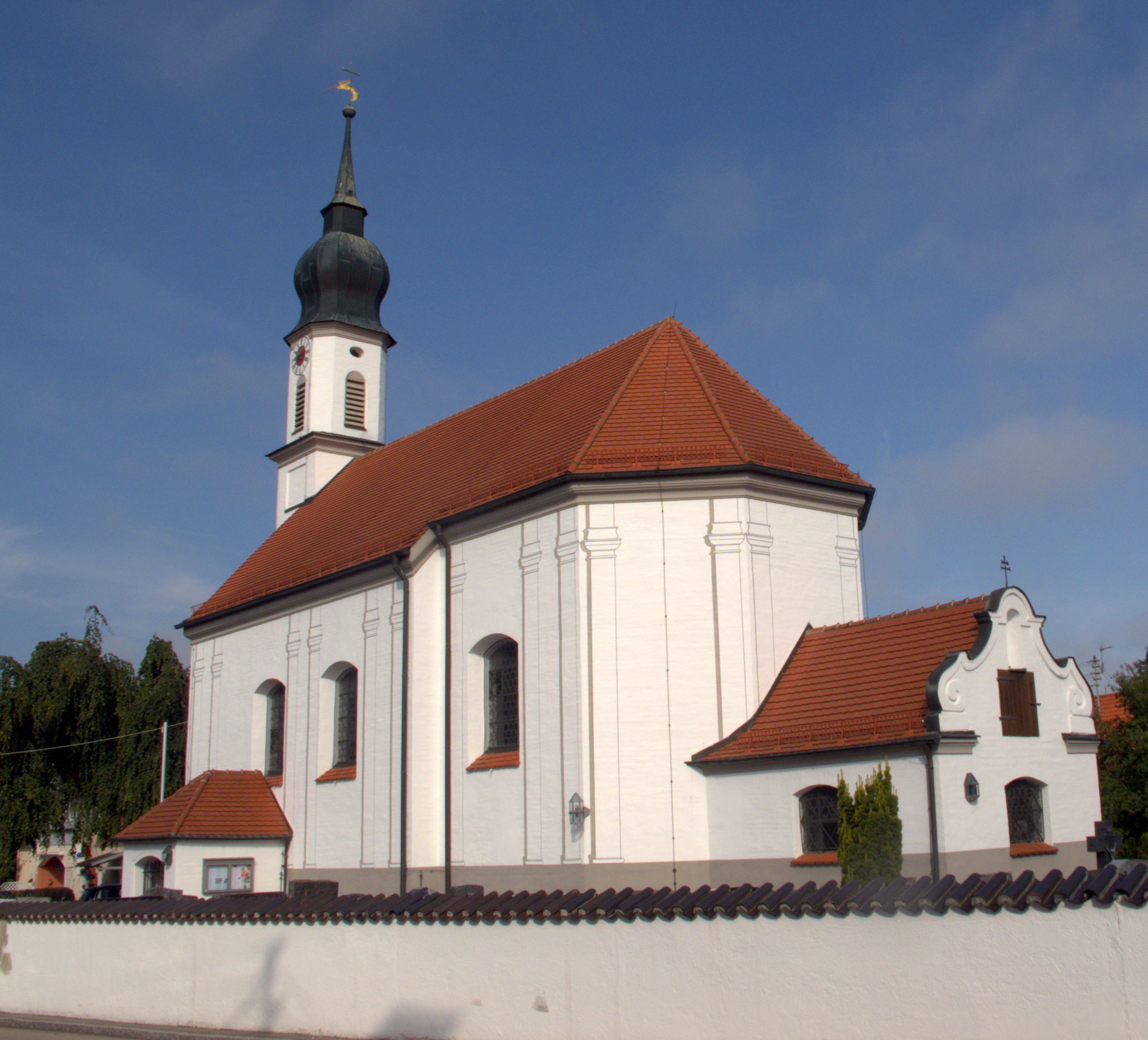
- Church of Saint Nicholas in Lengenfeld

- Coat of arms

- Location of Pürgen within Landsberg am Lech district
- Interactive map of Pürgen
- Location within Germany Location within Bavaria
- Coordinates: 48°2′N 10°55′E
- Country: Germany
- State: Bavaria
- Admin. region: Oberbayern
- District: Landsberg am Lech
- Municipal assoc.: Pürgen

Government
  - Mayor (2020–26): Wilfried Lechler

Area
  - Total: 21.99 km^{2} (8.49 sq mi)
- Elevation: 648 m (2,126 ft)

Population (2025-12-31)
  - Total: 3,740
  - Density: 170/km^{2} (440/sq mi)
- Time zone: UTC+01:00 (CET)
  - Summer (DST): UTC+02:00 (CEST)
- Postal codes: 86932
- Dialling codes: 08196
- Vehicle registration: LL
- Website: www.puergen.de

Pürgen (German pronunciation: [ˈpʏʁɡn̩]) is a municipality in the district of Landsberg in Bavaria in Germany.

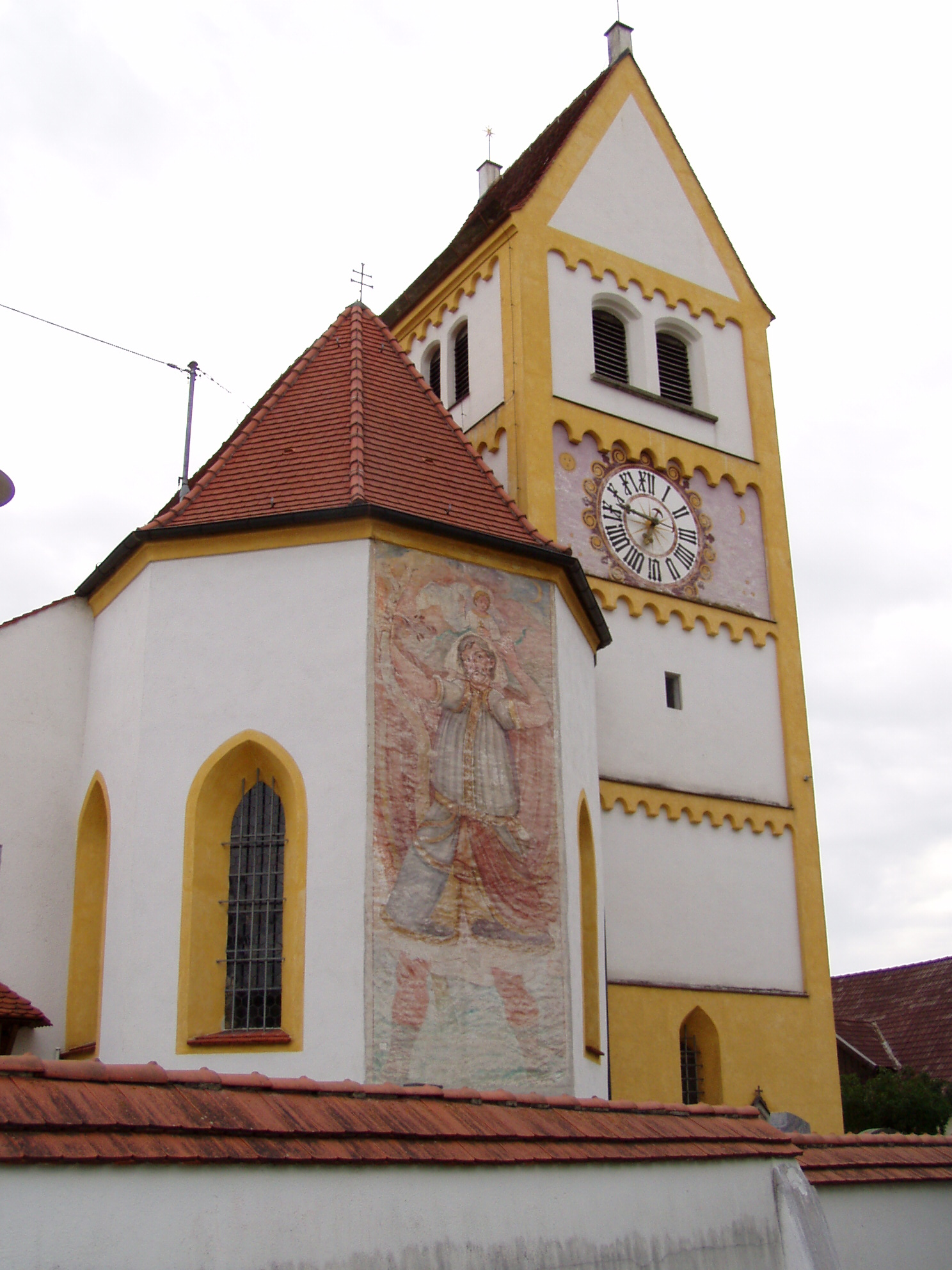
Church of Saint George in Pürgen
