= List of synagogues named Young Israel =

== Current Young Israel branches ==
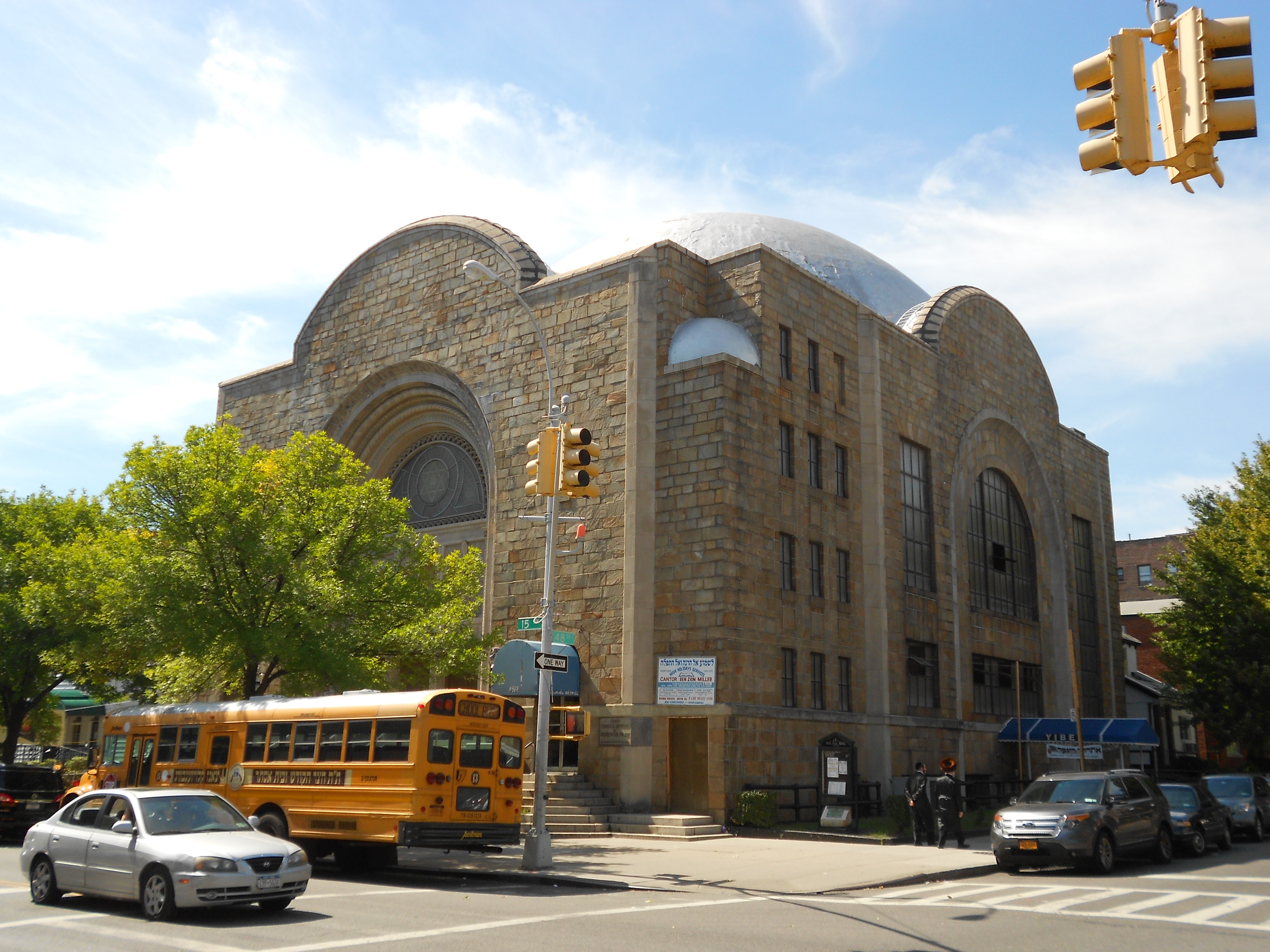
Young Israel Beth El of Borough Park

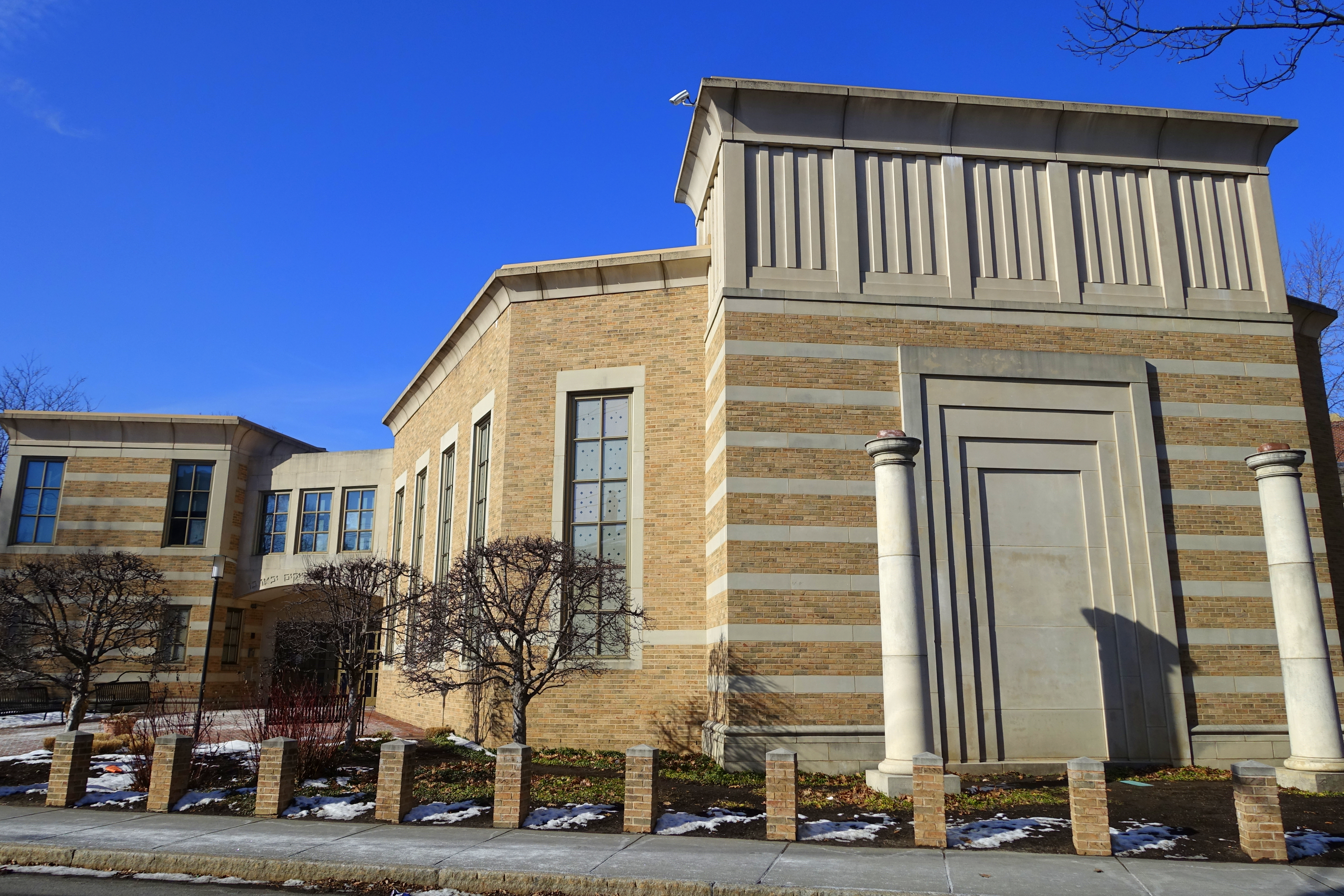
Young Israel of Brookline

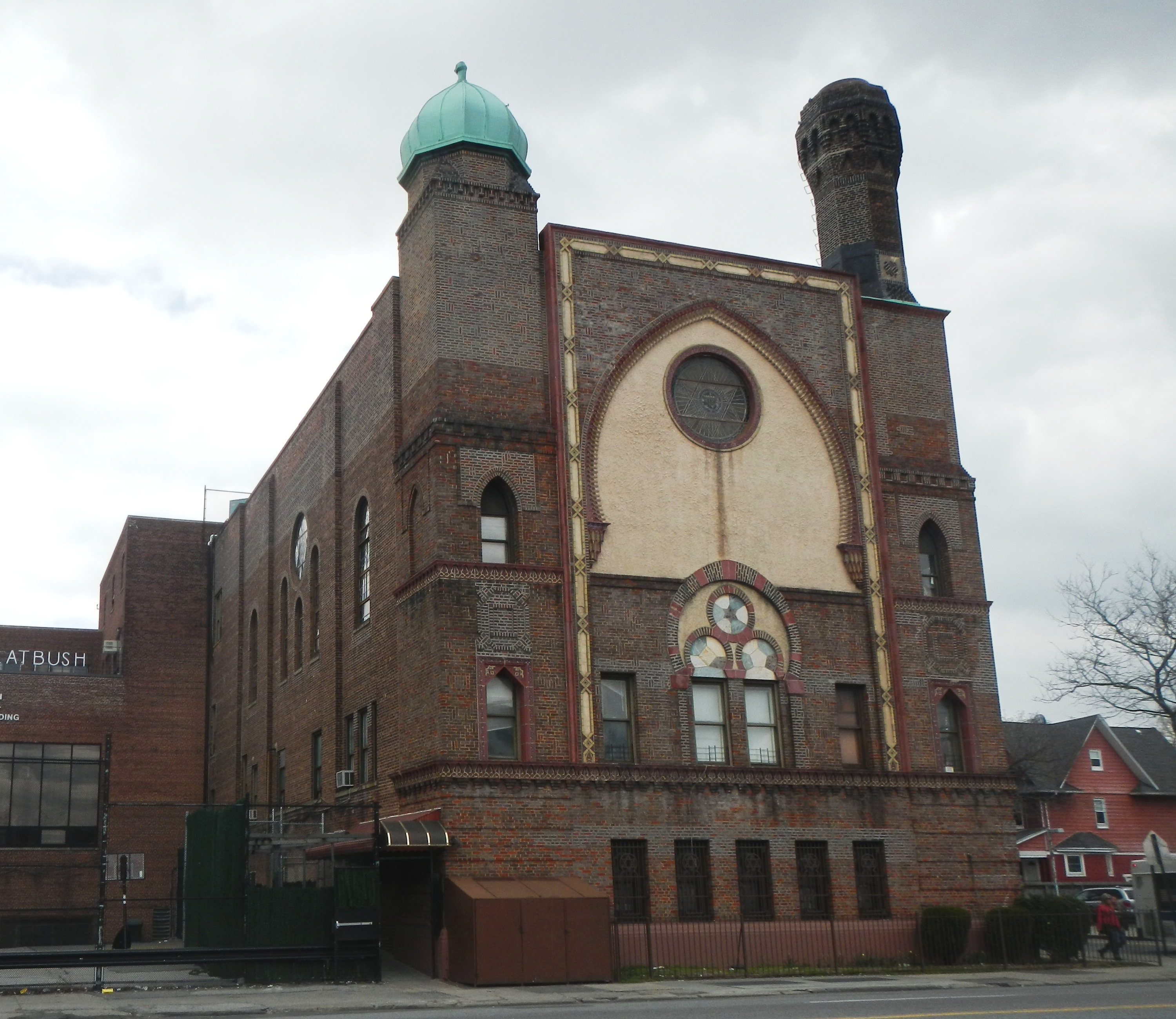
Young Israel of Flatbush

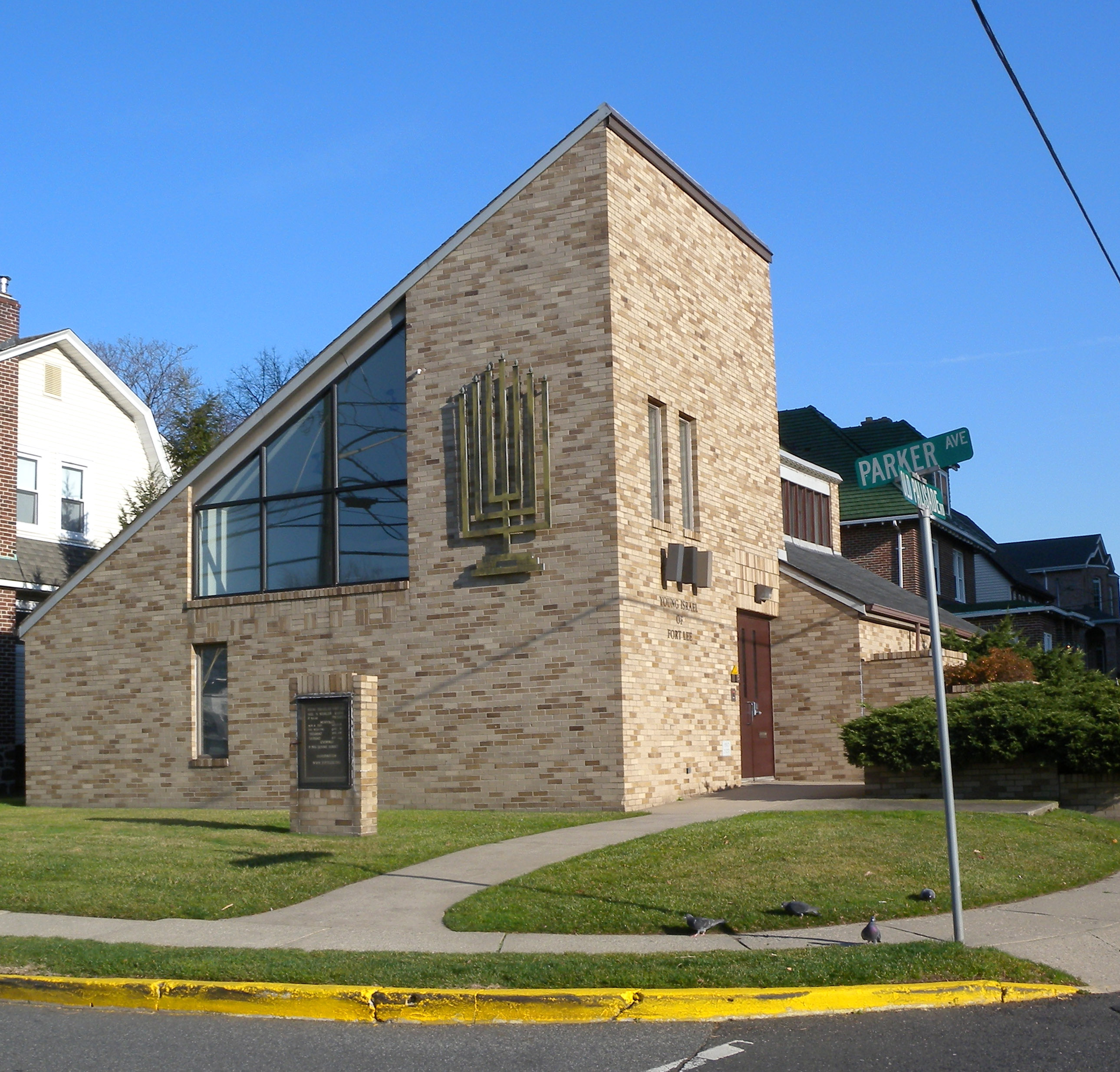
Young Israel of Fort Lee

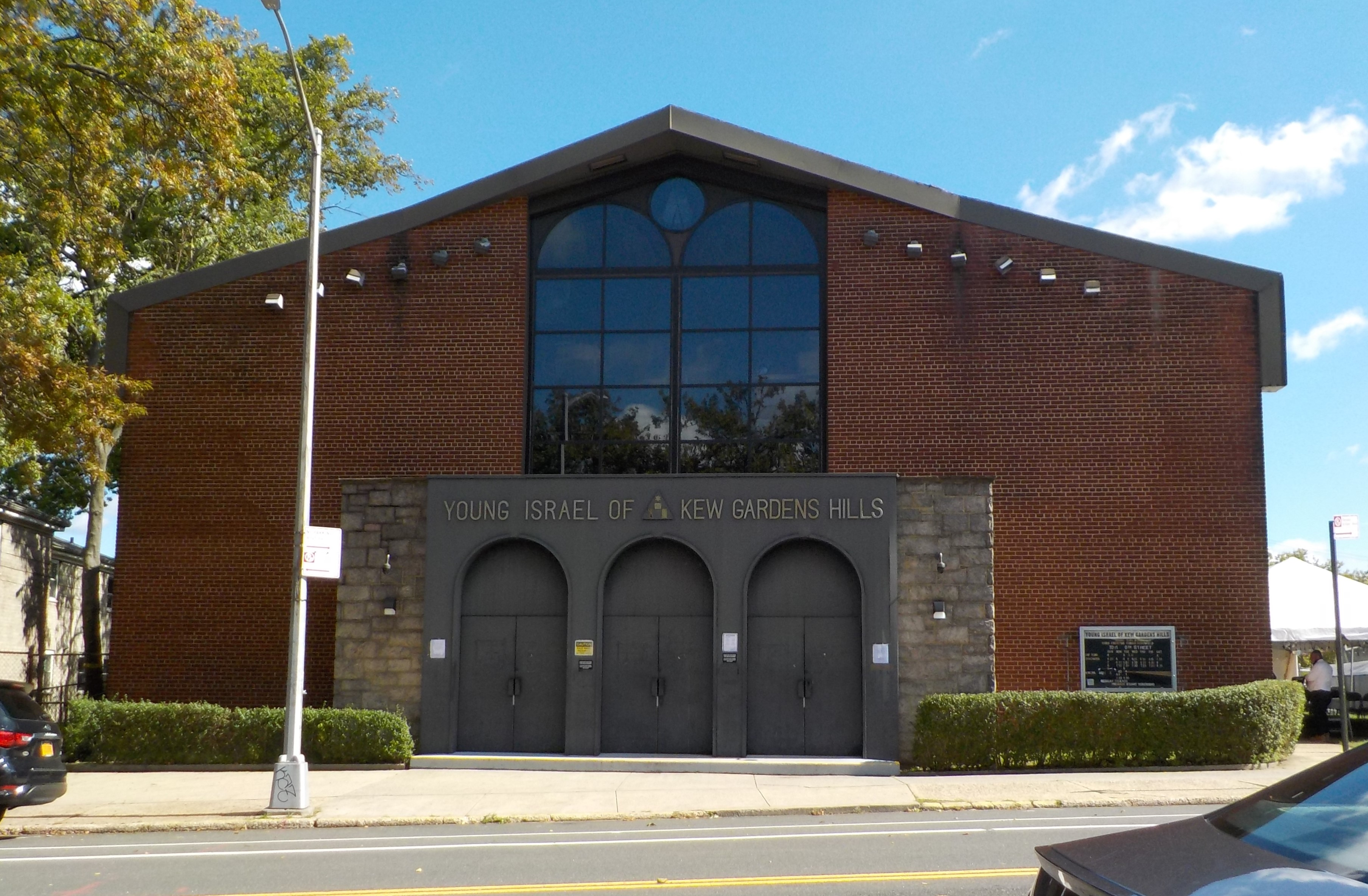
Young Israel of Kew Gardens Hills

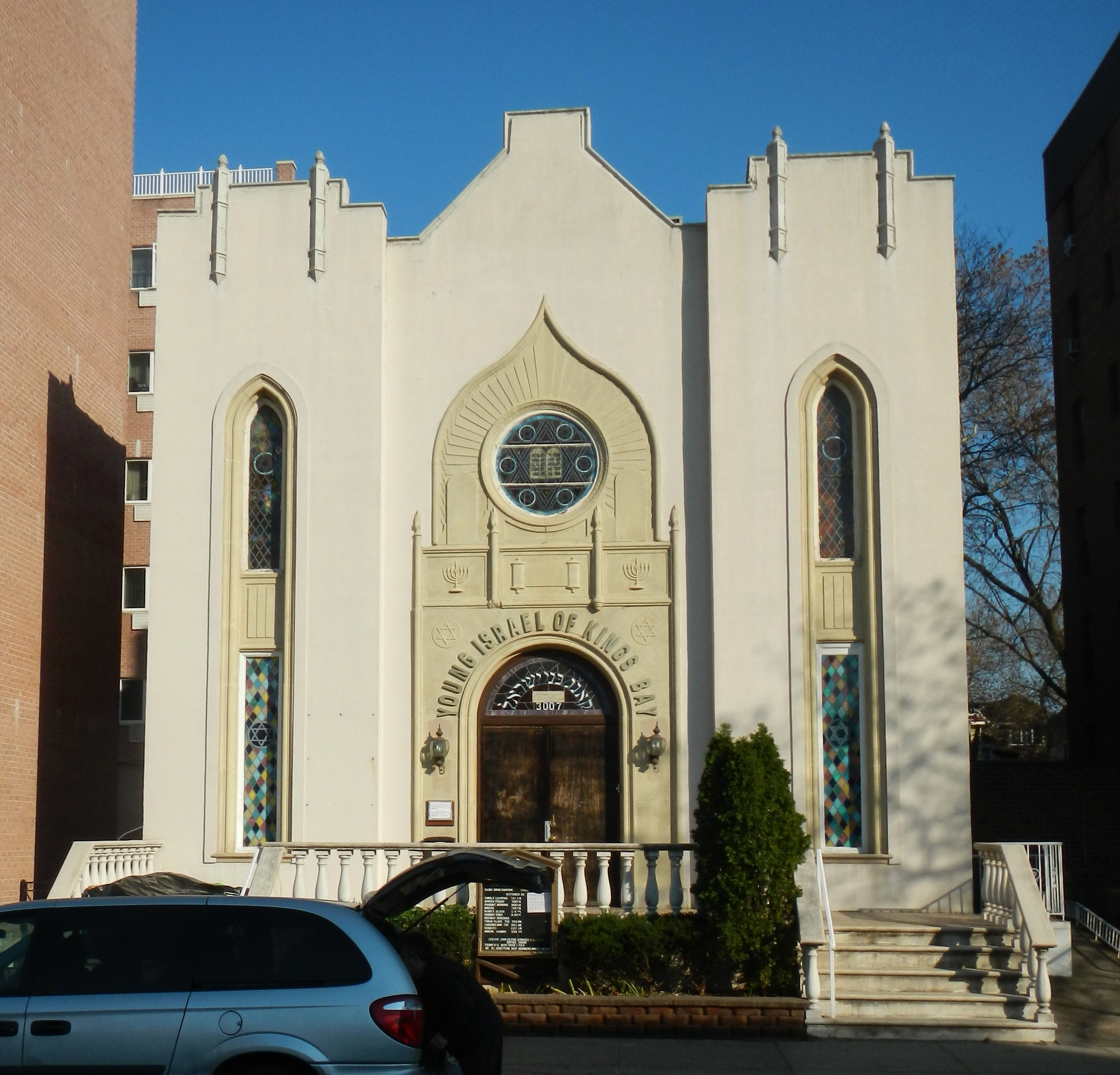
Young Israel of Kings Bay

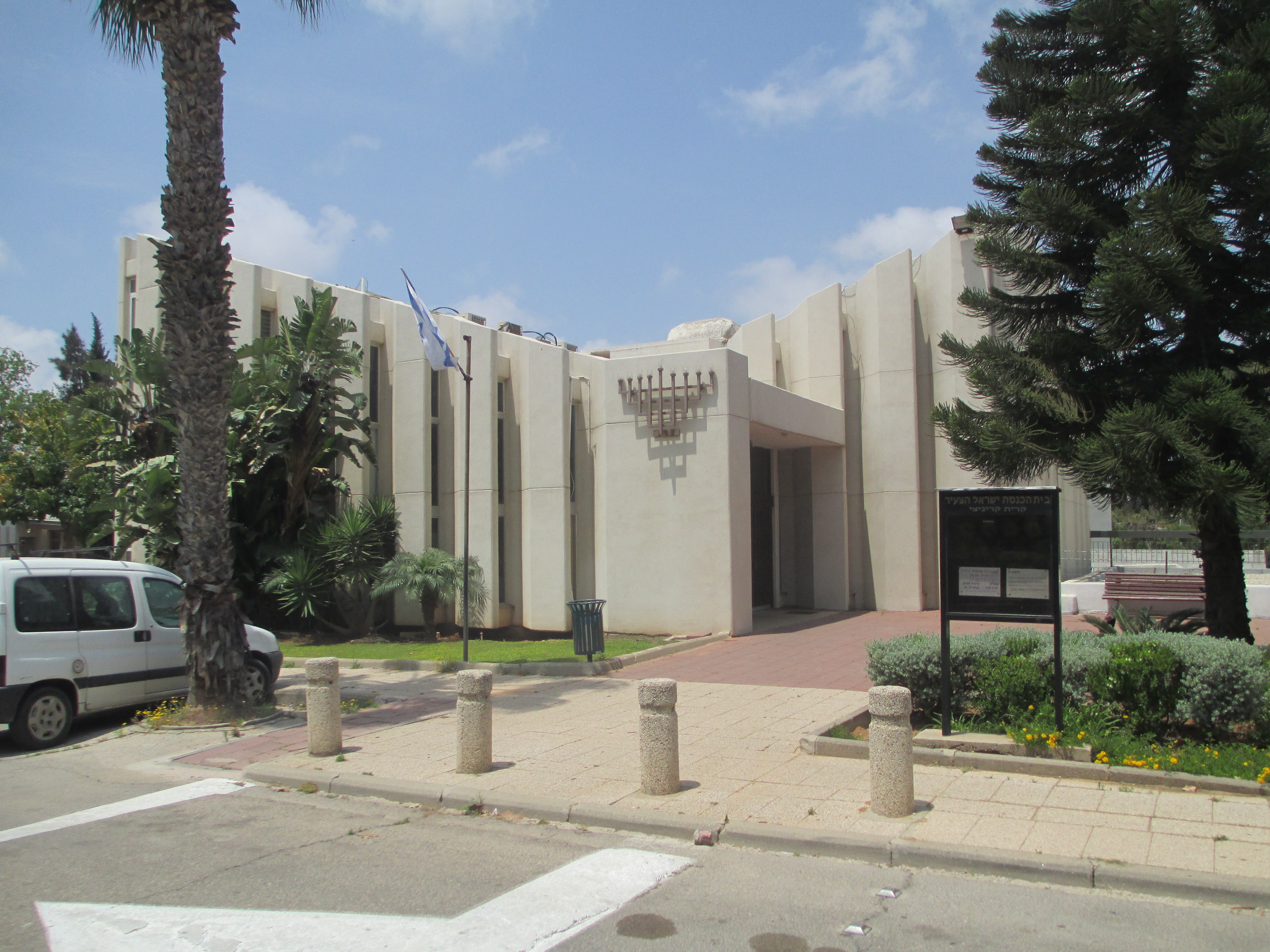
Young Israel Kiryat Krinitzi

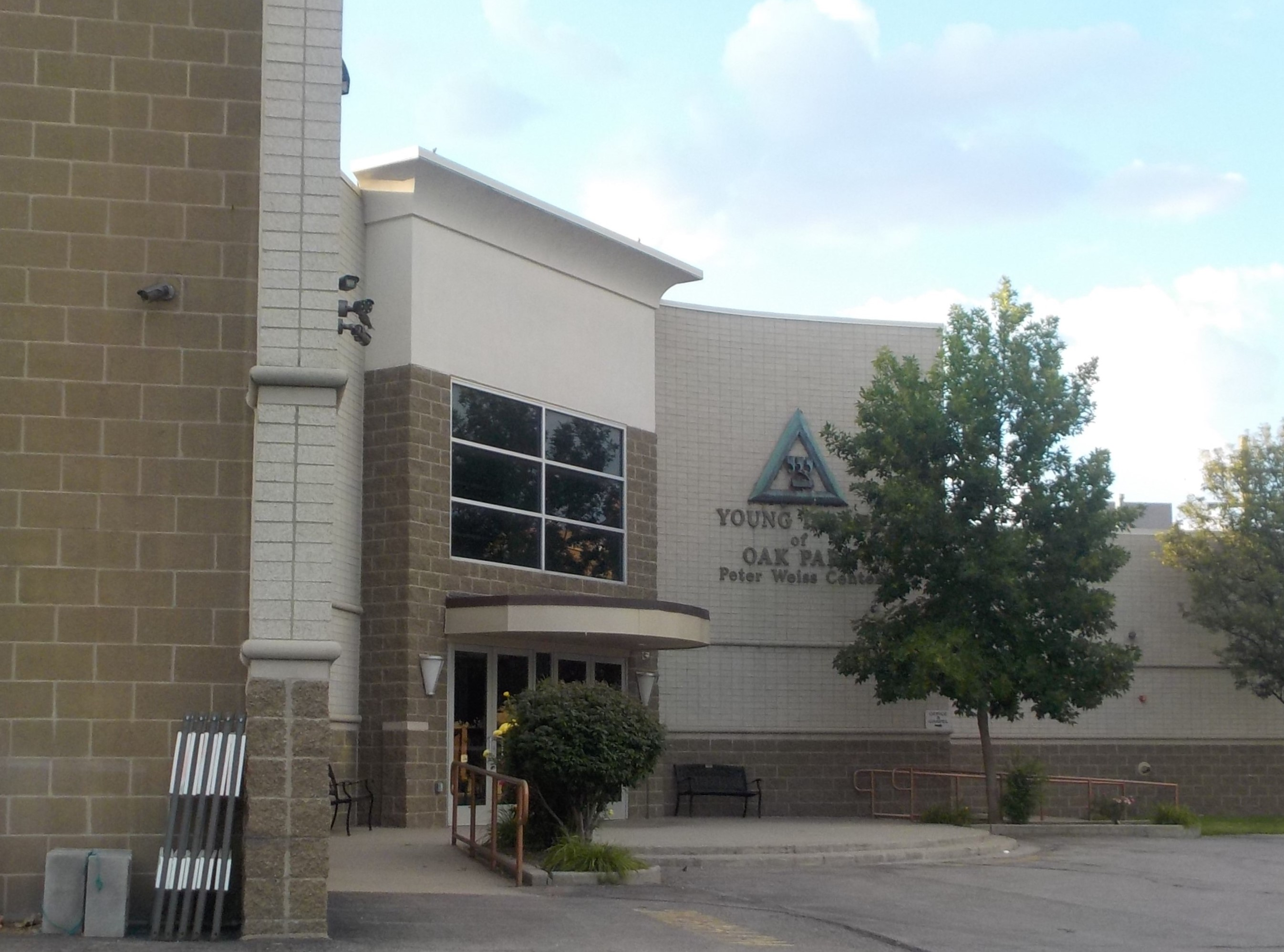
Young Israel of Oak Park

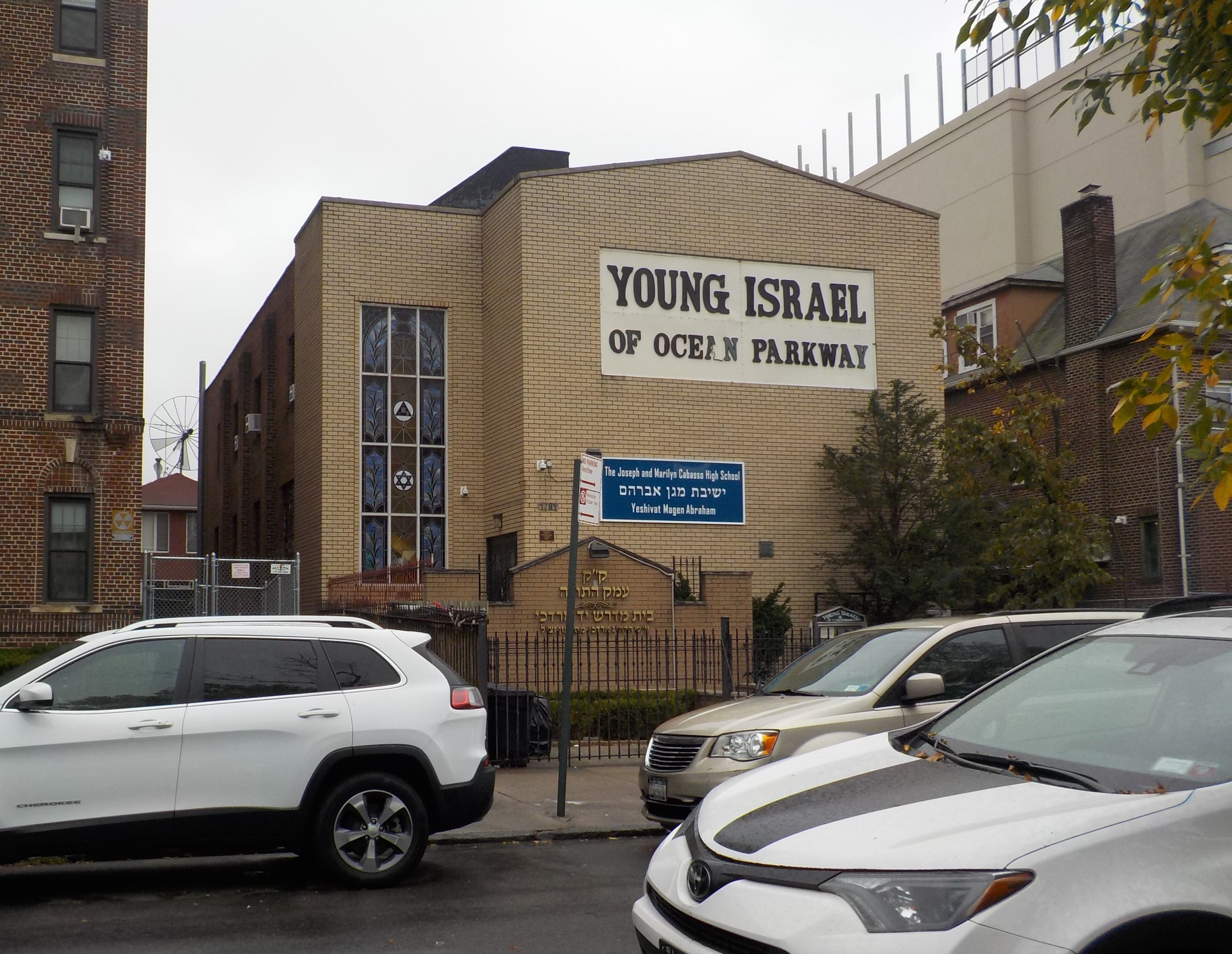
Young Israel of Ocean Parkway

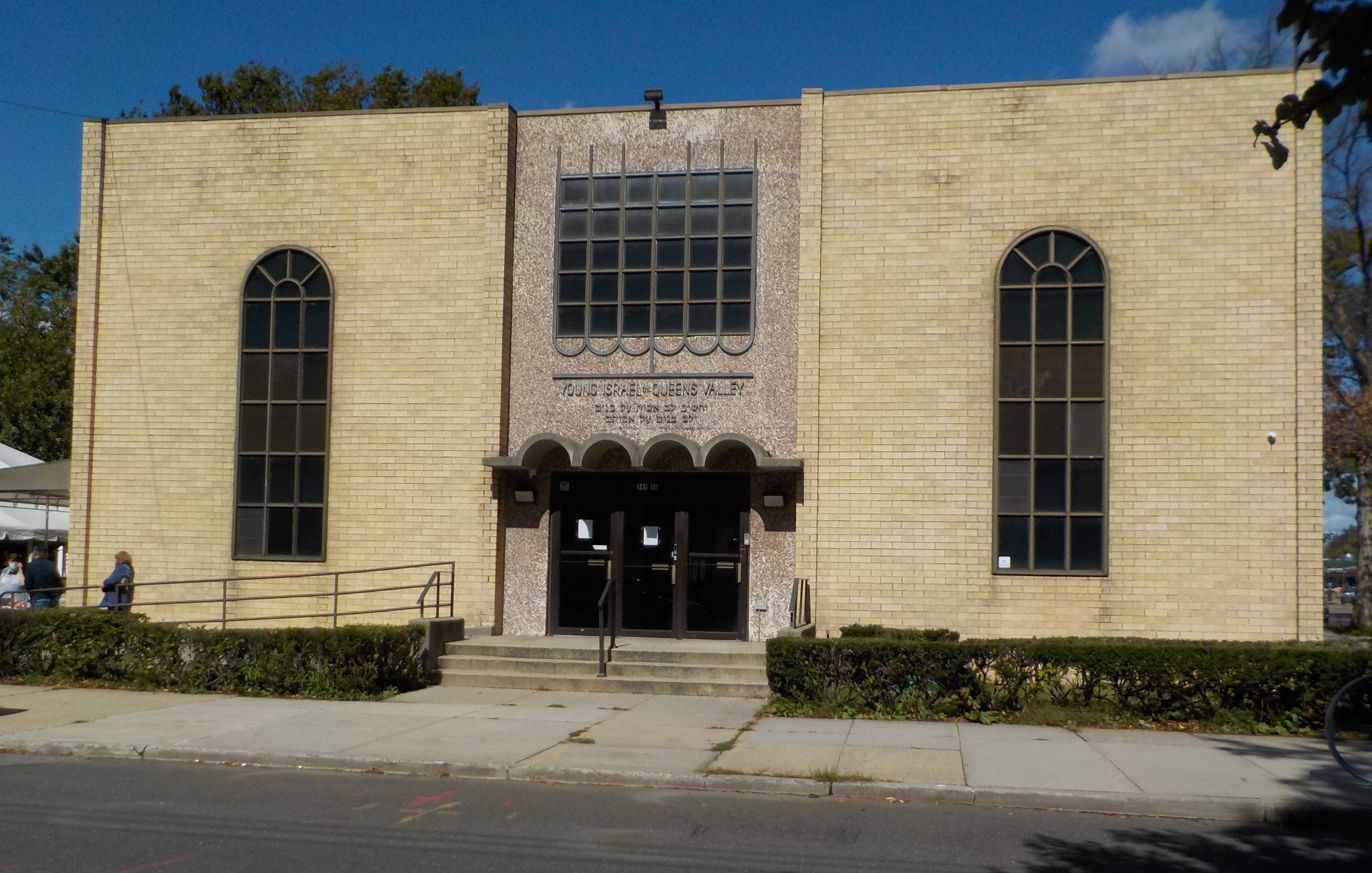
Young Israel of Queens Valley

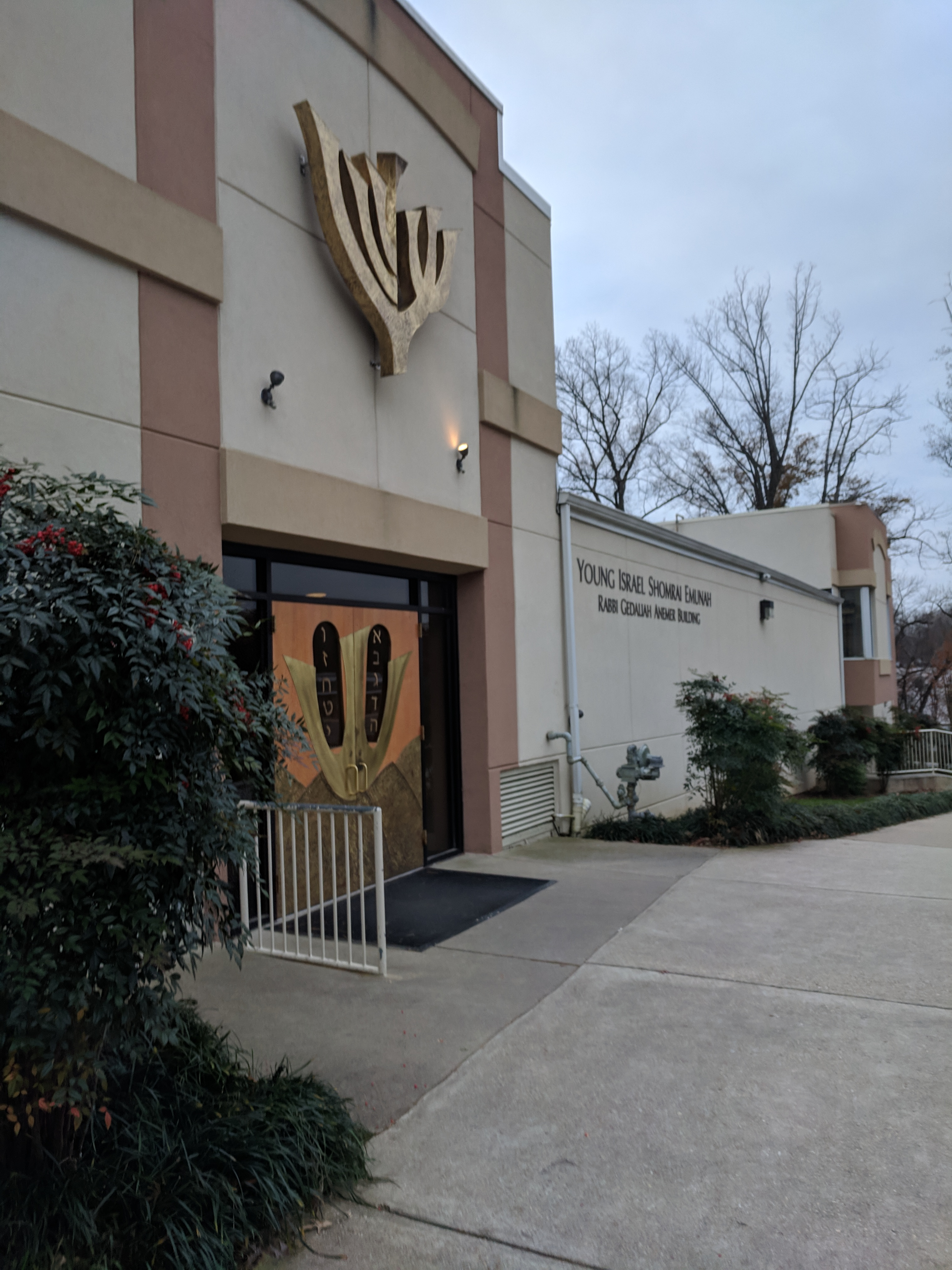
Young Israel Shomrai Emunah of Greater Washington

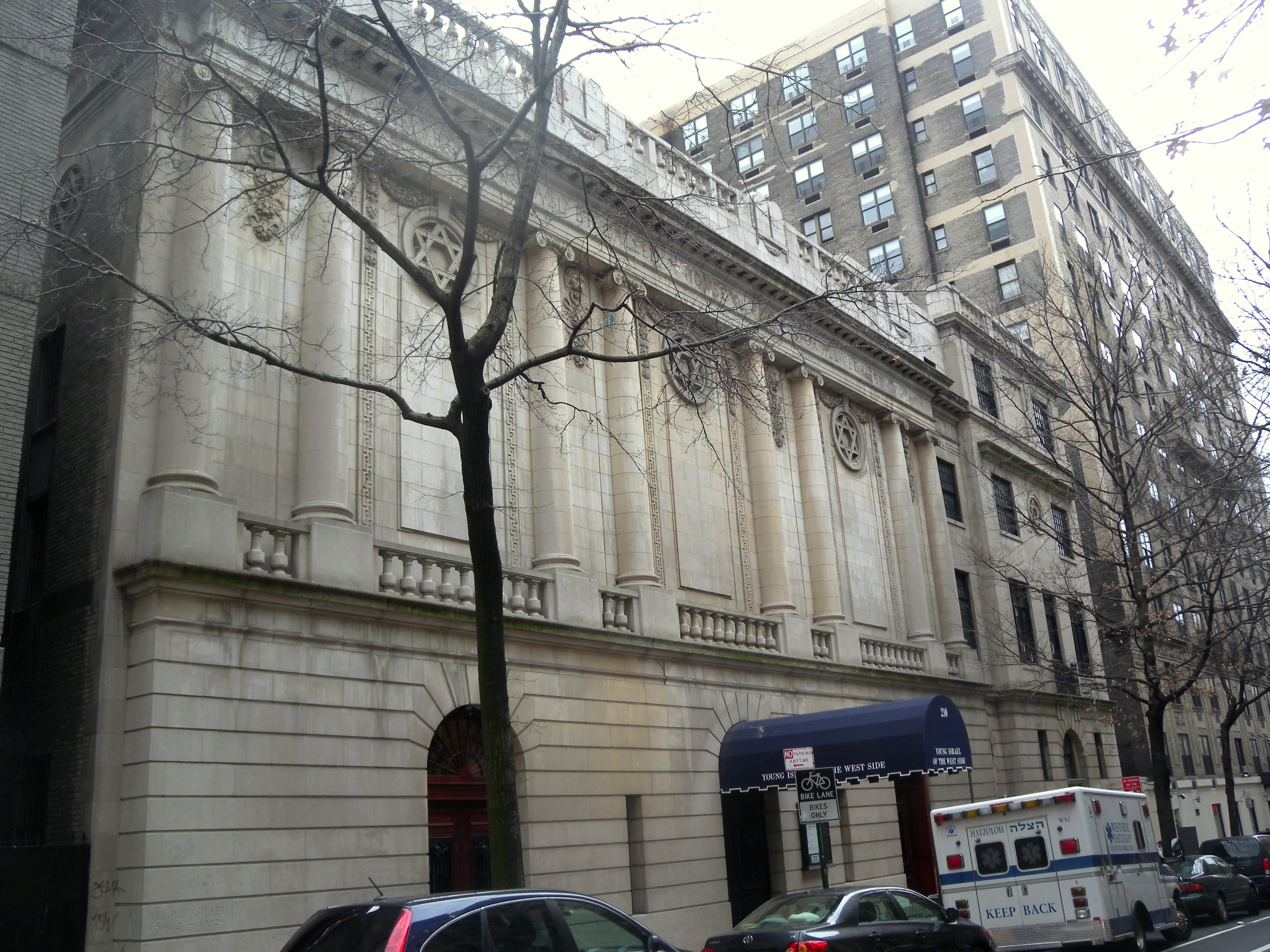
Young Israel of the West Side

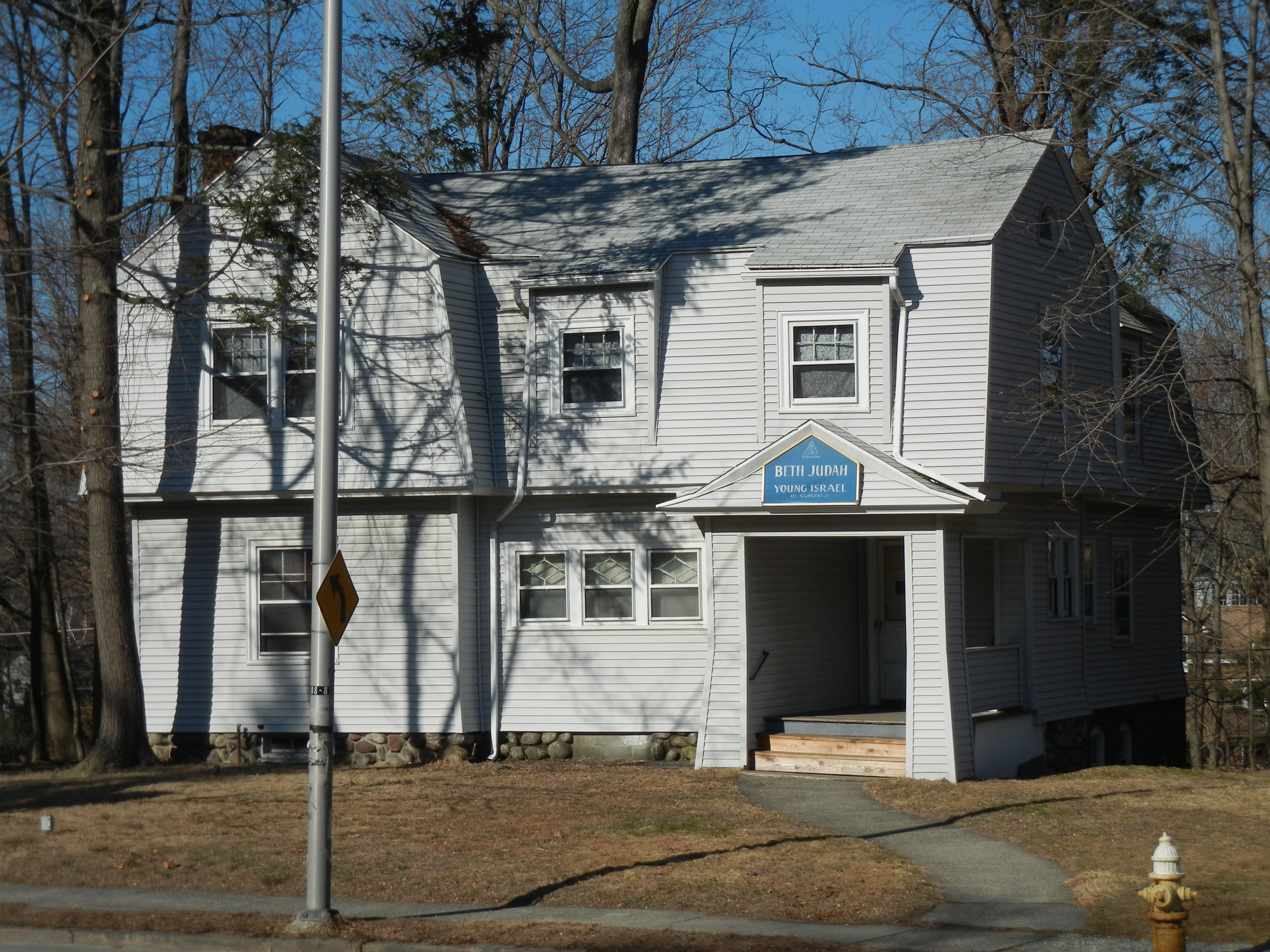
Congregation Beth Judah Young Israel of Worcester

Synagogue Name	Location	Rabbi	Ref.
Young Israel of Aberdeen-Congregation Bet Tefilah	Matawan, NJ, United States	Rabbi Yaakov Tesser	
Young Israel of Aventura	Miami, FL, United States	Rabbi Aviv Mizrachi	
Young Israel of Avenue J	Brooklyn, NY, United States	Rabbi Baruch Dov Braun	
Young Israel of Avenue K	Brooklyn, NY, United States	Rabbi Aryeh Ralbag	
Young Israel of Avenue U	Brooklyn, NY, United States	Rabbi Yisroel Feldstein	
Young Israel of Bal Harbour	Surfside, FL, United States	Rabbi Moshe Gruenstein	
Young Israel of Bayit Vegan (Migdal Shul)	Jerusalem, Israel		
Young Israel Beth El of Borough Park	Brooklyn, NY, United States	Rabbi Moshe Hubner	
Young Israel of Bedford Bay and Madison	Brooklyn, NY, United States	Rabbi Tzvi Fried	
Young Israel of Boca Raton	Boca Raton, FL, United States	Rabbi Eliyahu Rabovsky	
Young Israel of Briarwood	Jamaica, NY, United States		
Young Israel of Brighton Beach	Brooklyn, NY, United States	Rabbi Ephraim Zaltzman	
Young Israel of Brookline	Brookline, MA, United States	Rabbi David Hellman	
Young of Israel of Canarsie	Brooklyn, NY, United States	Rabbi Levi Tzfasman	
Young Israel of Century City	Los Angeles, CA, United States	Rabbi Elazar Muskin	
Young Israel of Cherry Hill	Cherry Hill, NJ, United States	Rabbi Jonathan Bienenfeld	
Young Israel of Chomedey	Laval, Quebec, Canada	Rabbi Avraham Banon	
Young Israel of Commack	Commack, NY, United States	Rabbi Raphael Wizman	
Young Israel of Co-Op City	The Bronx, NY, United States	Rabbi Solomon	
Young Israel of Coram	Coram, NY, United States	Rabbi Mordechai Golshevsky	
Young Israel of Claremont Parkway-Jlm (Note: Young Israel of Claremont Parkway-Jlm is also known as Young Israel of Givat Shaul)	Jerusalem, Israel	Rabbi Eitan Eisman	
Young Israel of Dallas	Dallas, TX, United States	Rabbi Shimon Ronen	
Young Israel of Deerfield Beach	Deerfield Beach, FL, United States	Rabbi Yisrael Edelman	
Young Israel of East Brunswick	East Brunswick, NJ, United States	Rabbi Efrayim Unterman	
Young Israel of East Flatbush and Remsen	Brooklyn, NY, United States		
Young Israel of East Northport	East Northport, NY, United States	Rabbi Aron Ackerman	
Young Israel of Elkins Park	Elkins Park, PA, United States	Rabbi Reuven Goldstein	
Young Israel of Eltingville	Staten Island, NY, United States	Rabbi Reuven Garfinkel	
Young Israel of Fair Lawn	Fair Lawn, NJ, United States	Rabbi Eli Belizon	
Young Israel of Far Rockaway	Far Rockaway, NY, United States	Rabbi Shaul Chill	
Young Israel of Flatbush	Brooklyn, NY, United States	Rabbi Kenneth Auman	
Young Israel of Forest Hills	Forest Hills, NY, United States	Rabbi Elisha Friedman	
Young Israel of Fort Lee	Fort Lee, NJ, United States	Rabbi Zev Goldberg	
Young Israel of Great Neck	Great Neck, NY, United States	Rabbi Shmuel Ismach	
Young Israel of Greater Buffalo	Buffalo, NY, United States	Rabbi Eliezer Marcus	
Young Israel of Greater Cleveland	Cleveland, OH, United States	Rabbi Naphtali Burnstein	
Young Israel of Greater Miami	Miami, FL, United States	Rabbi David Lehrfield	
Young Israel Shomrai Emunah of Greater Washington	Silver Spring, MD, United States	Rabbi Dovid Rosenbaum	
Young Israel of Hancock Park	Los Angeles, California, United States	Rabbi Elan Segelman	
Young Israel of Harrison	Harrison, NY, United States	Rabbi Yaakov Bienenfeld	
Young Israel of Hewlett	Hewlett, NY, United States	Rabbi Simcha Hopkovitz	
Young Israel of Hillcrest	Flushing, NY, United States	Rabbi Etan Schnall	
Young Israel of Holliswood	Jamaica, NY, United States	Rabbi Moshe Taub	
Young Israel of Hollis Hills-Windsor Park	Flushing, NY, United States	Rabbi Barry Kornblau	
Young Israel of Hollywood-Ft. Lauderdale	Fort Lauderdale, FL, United States	Rabbi Yosef Weinstock	
Young Israel of Hollywood Beach/Ahavat Shalom	Hollywood, FL, United States		
Young Israel of Houston	Houston, TX, United States	Rabbi Yehoshua Wender	
Young Israel of Huntington	Huntington, NY, United States	Rabbi Elazar Grossman	
Young Israel of Jamaica Estates	Jamaica, NY, United States	Rabbi Dov Lerner	
Young Israel of Karmiel	Karmiel, Israel	Rabbi Ephraim Schwartz	
Young Israel of Kendall	Pinecrest, FL, United States	Rabbi Hershel Becker	
Young Israel of Kensington	Brooklyn, NY, United States	Rabbi Hershel Kurzrock	
Young Israel of Kew Garden Hills	Flushing, NY, United States	Rabbi Daniel Rosenfelt	
Young Israel Kfar Ganim	Petach Tikvah, Israel	Rabbi Shmuel Krauthammer	
Young Israel of Kings Bay	Brooklyn, NY, United States	Rabbi Dovid Simpson	
Young Israel Kiryat Krinitzi	Ramat Gan, Israel		
Young Israel of Lawrence-Cedarhurst	Cedarhurst, NY, United States	Rabbi Yaakov Trump	
Young Israel of Lawrenceville	Lawrenceville, NJ, United States	Rabbi Yitzchak Goldenberg	
Young Israel of Long Beach	Long Beach, NY, United States	Rabbi Binyomin Silver	
Young Israel of Los Angeles	Los Angeles, CA, United States	Rabbi Dovid Thaler	
Young Israel Synagogue of Manhattan	New York, NY, United States	Rabbi Yeshaya Siff	
Young Israel of Mapleton Park	Brooklyn, NY, United States	Rabbi Hillel Zaltzman	
Young Israel of Margate	Margate City, NJ, United States	Rabbi Yankee Orimland	
Young Israel of Merrick	Merrick, NY, United States	Rabbi Dov Winston	
Young Israel of Midwood	Brooklyn, NY, United States	Rabbi Eli Baruch Shulman	
Young Israel of Memphis	Memphis, TN, United States	Rabbi Akiva Males	
Young Israel of Monsey and Wesley Hills	Monsey, NY, United States	Rabbi Ari Jacobson	
Young Israel of Montreal	Montréal, Quebec, Canada	Rabbi Menachem Willig	
Young Israel of Neve Aliza	Karnei Shomron, Israel	Rabbi Moshe Loewenthal	
Young Israel of New Hyde Park	Queens, NY, United States	Rabbi Lawrence Teitelman	
Young Israel of New Rochelle	New Rochelle, NY, United States	Rabbi Reuven Fink	
Young Israel of North Bellmore-YINB	North Bellmore, NY, United States	Rabbi Yisroel Halon	
Young Israel of North Beverly Hills	Beverly Hills, CA, United States	Rabbi Pinchas Dunner	
Young Israel of Northbrook	Northbrook, IL, United States	Rabbi Hershel Berger	
Young Israel of North Netanya	Netanya, Israel	Rabbi Baruch Boudilovsky	
Young Israel of Northridge	Northridge, CA, United States	Rabbi Nachi Klein	
Young Israel of North Woodmere	Valley Stream, NY, United States	Rabbi Yehuda Septimus	
Young Israel Ohab Zedek of North Riverdale/Yonkers	The Bronx, NY, United States	Rabbi Shmuel Hain	
Young Israel of Oak Park	Oak Park, MI, United States	Rabbi Shaya Katz	
Young Israel of Ocean Parkway	Brooklyn, NY, United States	Rabbi Avrohom Stolzenberg	
Young Israel of Oceanside	Oceanside, NY, United States	Rabbi Jonathan Muskat	
Young Israel of the Old City of Jerusalem	Jerusalem, Israel	Rabbi Nachman Kahana	
Young Israel of Orange County-YIOC	Irvine, CA, United States	Rabbi Dov Fischer	
Young Israel of Ottawa	Ottawa, Ontario, Canada	Rabbi Gavriel Rudin	
Young Israel of Passaic-Clifton	Passaic, NJ, United States	Rabbi Yaakov Glasser	
Young Israel of Patchogue	Patchogue, NY, United States	Rabbi Berel Sasonkin	
Young Israel of Pelham Parkway	The Bronx, NY, United States	Rabbi Ben Keil	
Young Israel of Pembroke Pines/Chabad of Century Village	Pembroke Pines, FL, United States	Rabbi Shimon Andrusier	
Young Israel of Phoenix	Phoenix, AZ, United States	Rabbi Yossi Bryski	
Young Israel-Chabad of Pinellas County	Palm Harbor, FL, United States	Rabbi Pinchas Adler	
Young Israel of (Greater) Pittsburgh	Pittsburgh, PA, United States	Rabbi Shimon Silver	
Young Israel of Plainview	Plainview, NY, United States	Rabbi Elie Weissman	
Young Israel Ezras Israel of Potomac	Potomac, MD, United States	Rabbi Yosef Singer	
Young Israel of Queens Valley	Flushing, NY, United States	Rabbi Shmuel Marcus	
Young Israel Ramat Poleg	Netanya, Israel	Rabbi Ido Pechtar	
Young Israel Rechov HaRav Kook (Note: Hebrew: בית כנסת המרכזי ישראל הצעיר, romanized: Beit Knesses HaMerkazi Yisrael HaTzair, lit. 'Central Synagogue Young Israel')	Bnei Brak, Israel	Rabbi Asher Landau	
Young Israel of Redwood	Brooklyn, NY, United States	Rabbi Shmaryahu Modes	
Congregation Kol Emes/Young Israel of Richmond	Richmond, VA, United States	Rabbi Yitzchak Zev Kolakowski	
Young Israel of Richmond B.C.	Richmond, British Columbia, Canada	Rabbi Yerachmiel Strausberg	
Young Israel of Riverdale	The Bronx, NY, United States	Rabbi Mordechai Willig	
Young Israel of San Diego	San Diego, CA, United States	Rabbi Eddie Rosenberg	
Young Israel of Scarsdale	Scarsdale, NY, United States	Rabbi Jonathan Morgenstern	
Young Israel of Sharon	Sharon, MA, United States	Rabbi Noah Cheses	
Young Israel of Skokie	Skokie, IL, United States	Rabbi Gershon Schaffel	
Young Israel of Southfield	Southfield, MI, United States	Rabbi Yechiel Morris	
Young Israel of Spring Valley	Spring Valley, NY, United States	Rabbi Baruch Neuman	
Young Israel of Stamford	Stamford, CT, United States	Rabbi Eli Kohl	
Young Israel of Staten Island	Staten Island, NY, United States	Rabbi Yakov Lehrfield	
Young Israel of St. Louis	St. Louis, MO, United States	Rabbi Moshe Shulman	
Young Israel of Sunny Isles	Sunny Isles Beach, FL, United States	Rabbi Moshe Maeir Haber	
Young Israel of Sunnyside	Sunnyside, NY, United States	Rabbi Ron Wittenstein	
Young Israel of Tampa Chabad	Tampa, FL, United States	Rabbi Uriel Rivkin	
Young Israel of Teaneck	Teaneck, NJ, United States	Rabbi Binyamin Krohn	
Congregation Young Israel of Tucson (Chabad of Tucson)	Tucson, AZ, United States	Rabbi Yossie Shemtov	
Young Israel of the Main Line	Bala Cynwyd, PA, United States	Rabbi Avraham Steinberg	
Young Israel of Vacation Village	Loch Sheldrake, NY, United States		
Young Israel of Wavecrest and Bayswater	Far Rockaway, NY, United States	Rabbi Eliezer Feuer	
Young Israel of West Hartford	West Hartford, CT, United States	Rabbi Tuvia Brander	
Young Israel of West Hempstead	West Hempstead, NY, United States	Rabbi Joshua Goller	
Young Israel of West Rogers Park	Chicago, IL, United States	Rabbi Elisha Preo	
Young Israel of the West Side	New York, NY, United States	Rabbi Yitzchak Gettinger	
Young Israel of White Oak	Silver Spring, MD, United States	Rabbi Yona Gewirtz	
Young Israel of White Plains	White Plains, NY, United States	Rabbi Shmuel Greenberg	
Young Israel of Woodmere	Woodmere, NY, United States	Rabbi Shalom Axelrod	
Congregation Beth Judah Young Israel of Worcester	Worcester, MA, United States	Rabbi Gershon Gulko	

== Former Young Israel branches ==
This is a partial list of former Young Israel synagogues in New York City

Synagogue Name	Location	Date of Closure	Ref.
Young Israel of Vanderveer Park	2820 Farragut Road, Brooklyn, United States	2011	
Young Israel of Astor Gardens	1328 Allerton Avenue, The Bronx, NY, United States	2020	
Young Israel of Bensonhurst-Bath Beach	41 Bay 28th Street, Brooklyn, NY, United States	2012, now Mesivta Bevet Chazon Ish	
Young Israel of Brooklyn	563 Bedford Avenue, Brooklyn, United States	1982, now Bais Yaakov of Adas Yereim	
Young Israel of the Concourse	1040 Grand Concourse, Bronx, United States	1982, now Bronx Museum of the Arts	
Young Israel of Eastern Parkway	937 Eastern Parkway, Brooklyn, United States	1974	
Young Israel of Fifth Avenue	3 West 16th Street, New York, NY, United States	merged with Sixth Street Synagogue	
Young Israel of Parkchester	1375 Virginia Avenue, Bronx, United States	2002	
Young Israel of Prospect Park	2170 Bedford Avenue, Brooklyn, United States	1991	
Young Israel of Laurelton	134-49 228th Street, Laurelton, United States	1976	
Young Israel of Mosholu Parkway	3231 Steuben Avenue, Bronx, United States	2015	
Young Israel of the Rockaways	52-05 Rockaway Beach Boulevard, Arverne, United States	1977	
Young Israel of Rugby	438 East 49th Street, Brooklyn, United States	1982	
Young Israel of Williamsburg	730 Willoughby Avenue, Brooklyn, United States	Closed 1968, sold in 1985	
Young Israel of Kingsbridge	2620 University Avenue, Bronx, United States	1983	
Young Israel of Jackson Heights	35-36 87th Street, Flushing, NY 11372	Building sold in 1998	
Young Israel of Brownsville	564 Hopkinson Avenue, Brooklyn, New York	Building vacated in 1964, subsequently merged with Young Israel of East Flatbush	

=== Outside New York City ===
Synagogue Name	Location	Date of Closure	Ref.
Young Israel of Canton	2508 North Market Avenue, Canton, Ohio, United States	Renamed Agudas Achim Congregation	
Young Israel of Dayton-Shomrei Emunah	1706 Salem Avenue, Dayton, Ohio, United States		
Young Israel of Detroit	12510 Dexter Avenue, Detroit, MI, United States		
Young Israel - Kehilath Jacob	374 North Main Street, Randolph, MA, United States	2013	
Young Israel of Newark	100 Chancellor Avenue, Newark, NJ, United States	1970, renamed and relocated to South Orange	
Young Israel of New Haven	287 Norton Street, New Haven, CT, United States	Renamed Yeshivas Beis Dovid Shlomo	
Young Israel of Northwest Detroit	17673 Wyoming Avenue, Detroit, MI, United States		
Young Israel of Oak-Woods	24061 Coolidge Highway, Oak Park, MI, United States	1996, merged with Young Israel of Oak Park	
Young Israel of Santa Barbara	1826-B Cliff Drive, Santa Barbara, CA, United States	2019, renamed Mesa Shul Santa Barbara	
Young Israel of Springfield	339 Mountain Avenue, Springfield, NJ, United States	1981, renamed as Congregation Israel of Springfield	
Young Israel of Syracuse	4313 East Genesee Street, Syracuse, NY, United States	2010, renamed Shaarei Torah	
Young Israel of Toco Hills	2056 Lavista Rd, Atlanta, Georgia, United States	2019, renamed Congregation Ohr HaTorah	
Young Israel of Toronto	129 McGillivray Avenue, Toronto, Ontario, Canada	Renamed Agudath Israel Congregation	

Young Israel Magen David West Las Vegas

== See also ==
- National Council of Young Israel
- Young Israel Shomrai Emunah
- Young Israel of Ottawa
- Young Israel of Flatbush
- Young Israel Beth El of Borough Park
- Elias Schwartz
- Mordechai Willig
- Benzion Miller
