= Young Israel Shomrai Emunah =

Orthodox synagogue in Silver Spring, Maryland

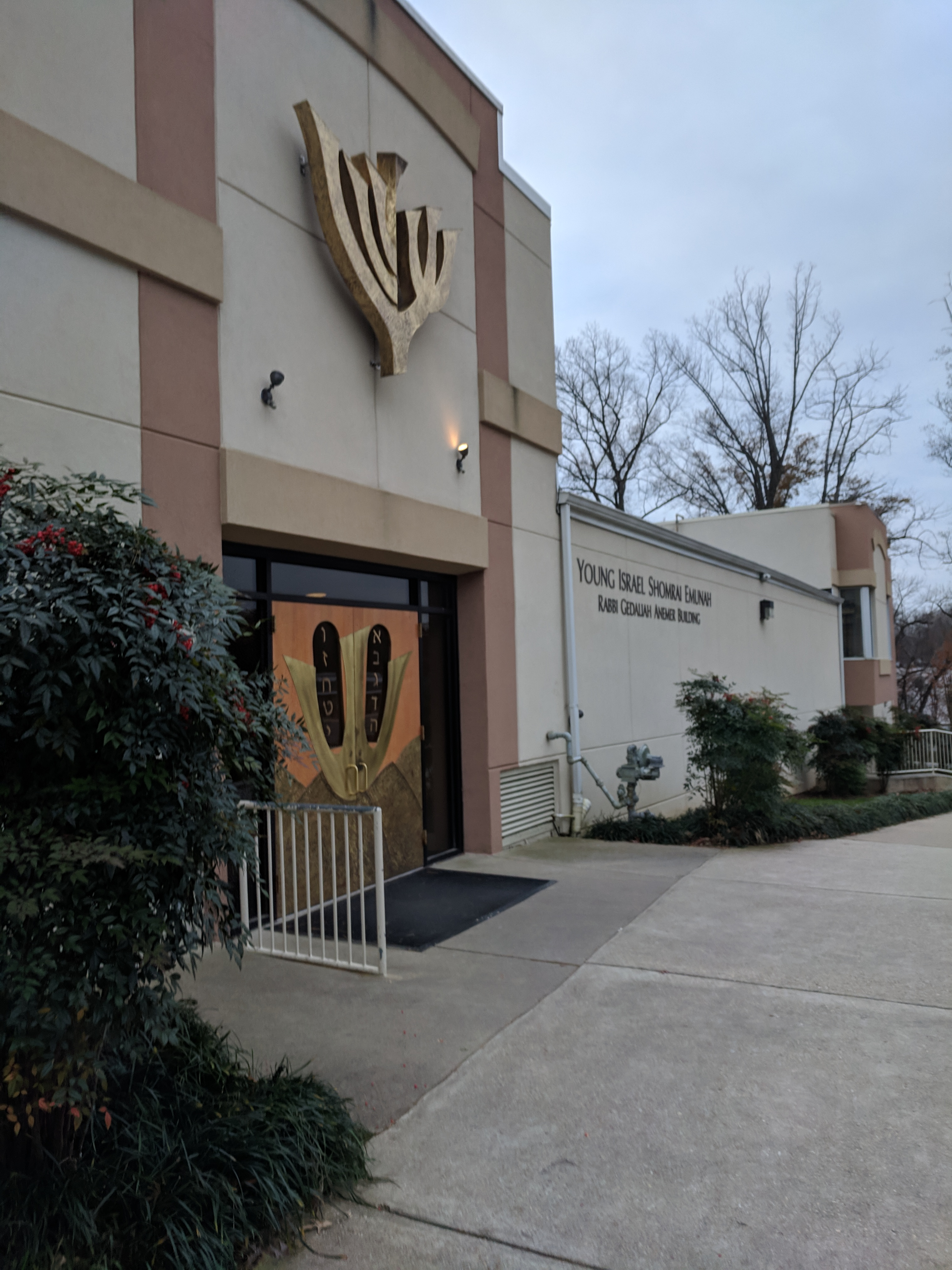
- Young Israel Shomrai Emunah synagogue

- Location within Maryland

Religion
- Affiliation: Orthodox Judaism
- Rite: Nusach Ashkenaz, Nusach Sefard, and Sephardi
- Ecclesiastical or organisational status: Synagogue
- Status: Active

Location
- Location: 1132 Arcola Avenue, Silver Spring, Maryland, 20902
- Country: United States
- Coordinates: 39.040972°N 77.029167°W

Architecture
- Type: Synagogue
- Established: 1951 (as a congregation)
- Completed: 1960
- Interior area: 19,158 square feet (1,779.8 m^{2})

Website
- www.yise.org

Young Israel Shomrai Emunah (abbreviated as YISE) is an Orthodox synagogue located at 1132 Arcola Avenue, in Kemp Mill, Montgomery County, Maryland, in the United States. Established as a congregation in 1951, it was the first Orthodox synagogue established in Montgomery County. It is one of the largest Orthodox synagogues in Maryland and is recognized as a key synagogue in the Silver Spring, Maryland area.

== Functions and services ==
The synagogue provides a full range of religious and social services, such a nursery school, banquet hall for weddings, prayer services for Sephardi Jews, assistance with job hunting, and notable guest speakers from the Jewish world. Young Israel has seven different services each Shabbat morning, from a minyan in the Sephardi tradition to one for early risers. All services are under the same roof.

== Affiliations and associations ==
The synagogue is affiliated with the National Council of Young Israel. The synagogue has sponsored Jewish educational activities with other local Orthodox institutions such as The Greater Washington Community Kollel. It offers a variety of programs such as for senior citizens in conjunction with the Jewish Community Center of Greater Washington. It is also affiliated with the Jewish Community Relations Council of Greater Washington.

For environmentalists it has co-hosted programs with the Canfei Nesharim organization that provides: "a Torah based approach to understand and act on the relationship between traditional Jewish sources and modern environmental issues...which explores environmentalism through the lens of Halacha (Jewish law) and traditional Jewish sources. The new initiative is known as Maayan Olam: the Silver Spring Torah and Environmental Group... endorsed by the Silver Spring Orthodox congregations Young Israel-Shomrai Emunah, Kemp Mill Synagogue."

== History ==
=== Origins ===
Congregation Shomrai Emunah was established in 1951 when several Jews formed a worship group in Chillum, Maryland. Rabbi Abraham A. Kellner was the first spiritual adviser.

Services were originally held in members' homes. Later on, the congregation held services in a Veterans of Foreign Wars lodge, and then used rented space at Chillum Castle at Chillum and Riggs roads that was owned by a Masonic lodge.

In 1955, Congregation Shomrai Emunah began raising $75,000 of funds to build its own synagogue. Land on the Maryland side of Eastern Avenue near Oglethorpe Road was purchased, and a groundbreaking ceremony was held on 12 May 1957. Approximately one-hundred families were members of Congregation Shomrai Emunah at the time.

The synagogue was dedicated on 22 December 1957. Rabbi Gedaliah Anemer led the ceremony, having become Shomrai Emunah's spiritual leader earlier that year.

=== Montgomery County ===
In the early 1960s, there was a trend of residents moving further into suburbs of Washington, D.C. With many of its members no longer living within walking distance to Shomrai Emunah's synagogue, attendance on Shabbat decreased significantly.

Rabbi Anemer bought a house near Kemp Mill, Maryland, and he began holding Shabbat services there every other week. When attendance at Rabbi Anemer's home quickly became too large for the space, Shomrai Emunah built a new synagogue on nearby University Boulevard. It was the first Orthodox Jewish congregation in Montgomery County. Shomrai Emunah later started another service at a member's home in the Montgomery Knolls area of Silver Spring.

By the late 1960s, the synagogue's membership outgrew the synagogue in Kemp Mill, so its membership raised funds to build a second, larger building in Kemp Mill. Rabbi Anemer established a religious school for girls in 1964. A religious school for boys opened the following year. On 29 April 1973, Shomrai Emunah held a groundbreaking ceremony for a new synagogue at Arcola Avenue and Lamberton Drive in Kemp Mill. The synagogue opened the following year.

Rabbi Anemer died on 15 April 2010. He held the position of rabbi for 52 years. He was succeeded by Rabbi Dovid Rosenbaum, who was officially installed on 20 November 2010.

== Notable congregants ==
- Samuel Kotz (1930-2010), mathematician and statistician
- Dov Lipman (1971-), member of the Knesset 2013-2015
- Azriel Rosenfeld (1931-2004), computer scientist and mathematician
- Saul Jay Singer (1951-), legal ethicist and The Jewish Press columnist

== See also ==
- History of the Jews in Maryland
