= Rabbi Jacob Joseph School =

Orthodox day school, founded 1903

Coordinates: 40.50052°N 74.39837°W

The Rabbi Jacob Joseph School is an Orthodox Jewish day school located in Staten Island, New York that serves students from nursery through eighth grade, with another branch in Edison, New Jersey which serves High School and Beis Medrash.

Founded in 1900 by Rabbi Shmuel Yitzchok Andron as the Beth Sefer Tifereth Jerusalem (Glory of Jerusalem School), it became the Rabbi Jacob Joseph School to honor New York's chief rabbi in 1903.

The Rabbi Jacob Joseph School was known for its rigorous Talmudic curriculum and remains open to students from nursery age through the twelfth grade.

Its founders originally established the school on Manhattan's Orchard Street on the Lower East Side. It moved to Henry Street in 1907, and expanded to a second building in 1914. Lazarus Joseph (1891–1966), grandson of Rabbi Jacob Joseph, and New York state senator and New York City Comptroller, played an active role as a board member in the school.

== 1969–present ==
In 1969, it stopped its younger grades. Enrollment was low, and the neighborhood had changed. In 1972, it made plans to open a new campus in Riverdale, Bronx, but ultimately, in 1976, the school moved to the Richmondtown area of Staten Island, where it maintained the boys' school campus until 2017 (they then moved to Amboy Road); a girls division of the elementary school was established in Staten Island's Graniteville section. In 1982, a boys high school branch and Beis Medrash was opened in Edison, New Jersey.

Although the school ("RJJ") is no longer an "advanced" yeshiva, it "produced hundred of rabbis and community leaders in the late 1940s, the 1950s and the 1960s, and was also an important feeder school for the Lakewood yeshiva, Beth Medrash Govoha".

The school also produces a semi-annual scholarly publication, the Journal of Halacha and Contemporary Society ("The RJJ Journal"), edited by one of its rabbinic alumni. The purpose of the Journal is to "study the major questions facing Jews ... through the prism of Torah values," and "explore the relevant biblical and Talmudic passages and survey the halakhic literature including the most recent responsa. The Journal does not in any way seek to present itself as the halachic authority on any question, but hopes rather to inform the Jewish public of the positions taken by rabbinic leaders over the generations."

Rabbi Dr. Marvin Schick served for over 30 years as the (unpaid) President of RJJ until his death in 2020; he had succeeded Irving Bunim.

== Notable alumni ==
- Robert Aumann (born 1930), recipient of the Nobel Memorial Prize in Economic Sciences in 2005
- Rabbi Reuven Bulka (1944–2021), recipient of the Order of Canada and Rabbi Emeritus of Congregation Machzikei Hadas
- Ari L. Goldman (born 1949), author and former religion reporter for The New York Times
- Louis Henkin (1923–2010), human rights law scholar
- Marvin Hier (born 1939), founder of the Simon Wiesenthal Center
- Rabbi Moshe Hillel Hirsch, rosh yeshiva of Slabodka
- Sidney Lens (1912–1986), labor leader and political activist
- Rav Aaron Lopiansky, Rosh Yeshiva of Yeshiva of Greater Washington - Tiferes Gedaliah, Halachic authority (posek)
- Rabbi Chaim Pinchas Scheinberg (1910–2012), founder and head of Torah Ore yeshiva in the Kiryat Mattersdorf neighborhood of Jerusalem, Israel, world-renowned educator and decisor of Jewish law, and member of Moetzes Gedolei HaTorah of Israel
- Sheldon Silver (1944–2022), former speaker of the New York State Assembly.
- Rabbi Meir Stern, rosh yeshiva of Passaic
- Rabbi Dovid Trenk (1941–2019), Rosh Yeshiva, Yeshiva Moreshes Yehoshua
- Tzvi Hersh Weinreb (born 1940), Executive Vice President Emeritus of the Orthodox Union
- Rabbi Mordechai Willig (born 1947), Rosh Yeshiva of RIETS
- Rabbi Meir Zlotowitz (1943–2017), founder of Artscroll publications
