= Dov Lipman =

Israeli politician (born 1971)

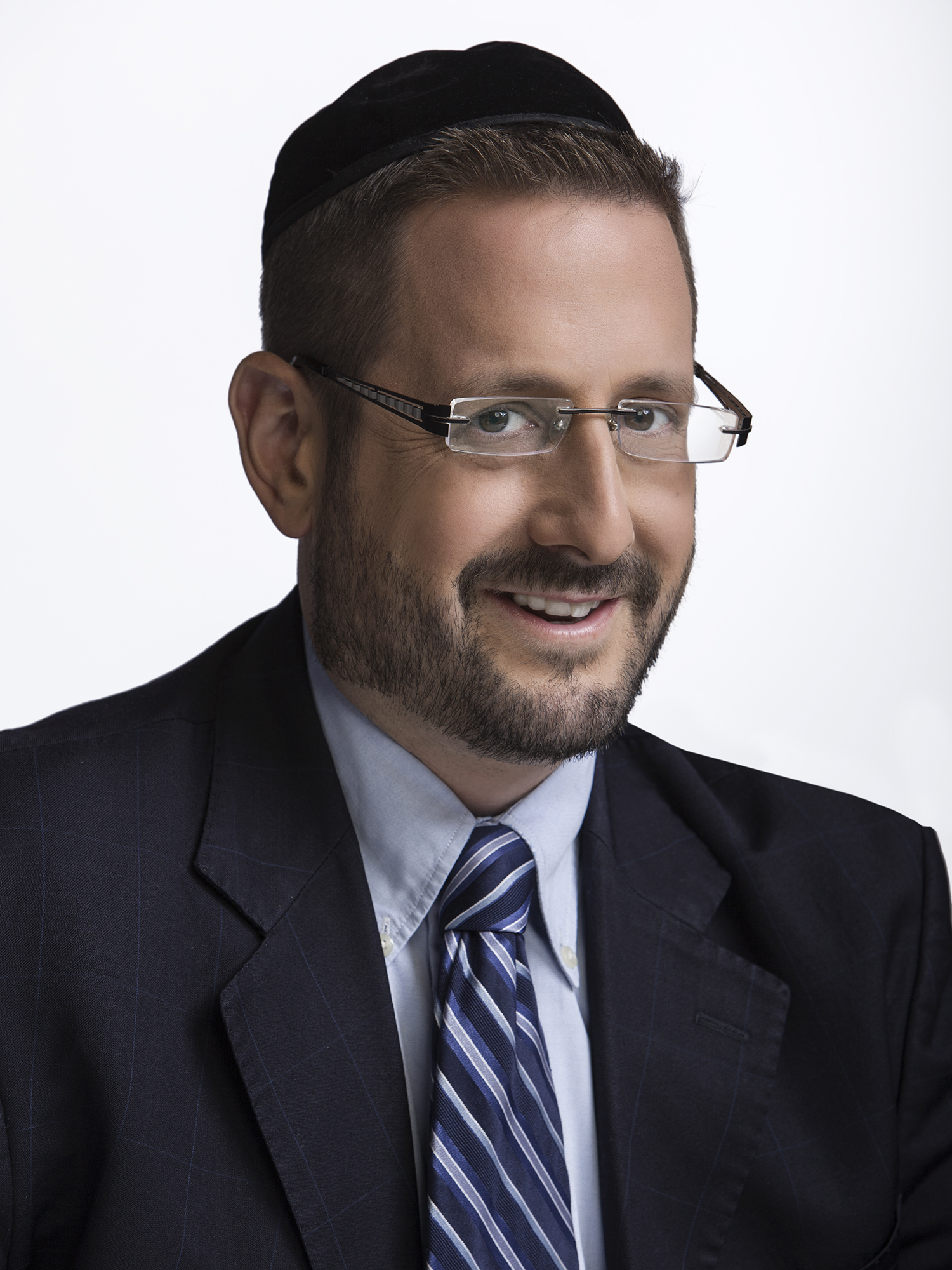
- Lipman in 2012

Faction represented in the Knesset
- 2013–2015: Yesh Atid

Personal details
- Born: 9 September 1971 (age 54) Washington, D.C., United States

Dov Lipman (Hebrew: דב ליפמן; born 9 September 1971) is an Israeli former politician. He served as a member of the Knesset for Yesh Atid between 2013 and 2015.

== Biography ==
Lipman was born in Washington, D.C. and grew up in Kemp Mill, Maryland, where he attended the Hebrew Academy of Greater Washington and the Yeshiva of Greater Washington where he was captain of the varsity basketball team and president of the student council. He also served as an intern for Congressman John Dingell. After high school, he studied at Mercaz HaTorah in Jerusalem for two years including during the Gulf War where he was in charge of the yeshiva's sealed room. Lipman continued his studies at Ner Israel Rabbinical College in Baltimore, Maryland where he received rabbinic ordination while studying at Johns Hopkins University where he received a master's degree in Education.

Lipman was among the founding families of the Cincinnati Community Kollel. They spent three years in Cincinnati before moving back to Silver Spring where Lipman became a Rabbi and teacher of Judaic Studies at his alma mater, the Yeshiva of Greater Washington.

In July 2004, the Lipman family immigrated to Israel, and moved to Bet Shemesh where Lipman taught in post-high school yeshivot and seminaries Yesodei HaTorah, Machon Maayan, Tiferet and Reishit Yerushalayim. Tensions between other religious elements and the broader population in the city brought Lipman into community activism and he led the battle against the extremism, most notably during the beginning of the 2011 school year at the Orot girls school.

== Political career ==
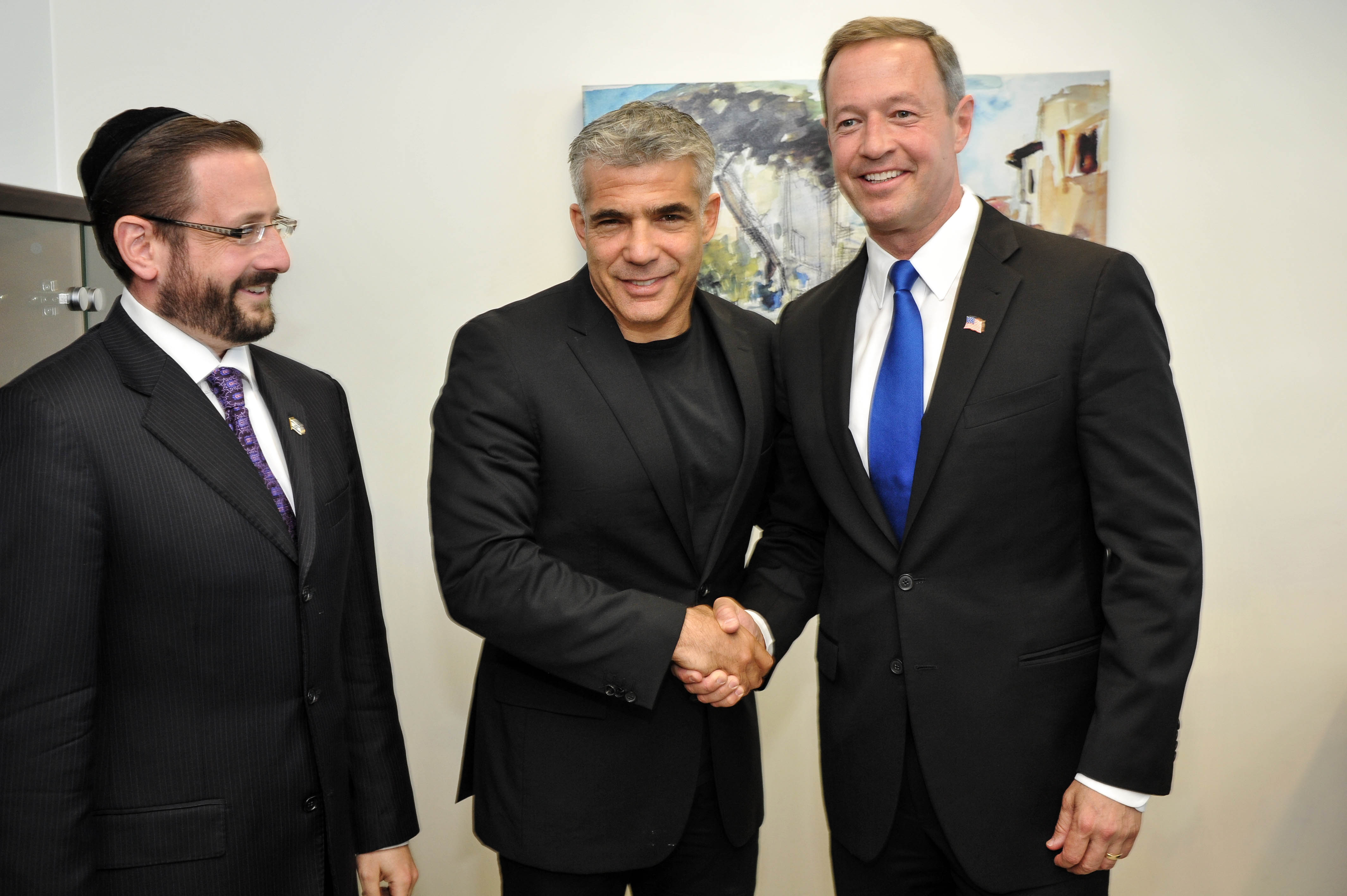
Dov Lipman with Yair Lapid and Martin O'Malley in 2013

In December 2012, Yair Lapid named Lipman number 17 on the electoral list for Knesset of his new Yesh Atid party. The party won 19 seats in the January 2013 elections and Lipman was elected to Knesset, becoming its first American-born member in nearly 30 years. He renounced US citizenship to take the position, as Israeli law does not allow dual citizens to serve in the Knesset.

During the 19th Knesset, Lipman served on the Finance Committee, the Immigration, Absorption and Diaspora Affairs Committee, the Knesset House Committee and the special committee for legislation on Haredi conscription into military or national service. He chaired the Knesset task force to help Haredim enter the work force, the Knesset task force for dialogue between religious and secular, and held the party's portfolio for the environment, public health, and preventing the suffering of animals. Lipman also headed the Knesset's delegation to the parliaments of South Africa and England. He took part in diplomatic missions to South Africa (including attending Nelson Mandela's funeral), England, Germany, Hungary, and the United States.

Lipman was placed seventeenth on the Yesh Atid list for the 2015 elections, which saw him lose his seat as the party won only eleven seats. After the elections he continued his public work as the Chairman of Anglo and Diaspora Affairs for Yesh Atid. However, in May 2018, he left the party due to "personal reasons".

In June 2017, Lipman's son was attacked by a mob of ultra-Orthodox extremists when he entered an ultra-Orthodox Haredi neighborhood in Mea Shearim dressed in his IDF uniform. The IDF uniform upset the extremists as they are hostile towards ultra-Orthodox individuals serving in the IDF. Lipman characterized the incident as part of a broader pattern of rising hostility toward Haredi soldiers and proposed legislation to address the tension.

He hosted a weekly radio show on Voice of Israel called "One Nation with Dov Lipman," serves as a political correspondent for i24news, and writes columns for the Jerusalem Post and the Times of Israel.

Lipman served as the secretary-general of the World Confederation of United Zionists, part of the World Zionist Organization, from 2020 to 2021, where he helped the Jewish community of Uganda. In June 2021, Lipman established Yad LʼOlim, and NGO which provides services for new immigrants, their families and global Jewry.

== Views and opinions ==
Lipman advocates basic secular education for all schools in Israel wanting to receive government funding, increased employment opportunities for those among the Orthodox population who want to join the work force and some form of national service, be it military or social, for every citizen. He believes his task is to be "a conduit of tolerance and acceptance" between the Haredi and secular world. Lipman worked with the secular Lapid in the struggle to fight extremism in the Haredi community. Lipman worked with Rabbi Menachem Bombach to establish a network of yeshiva high schools aimed at Haredi boys and girls, providing an educational framework that integrates intensive religious studies with general studies.

In the wake of Lipman's argument that Haredi boys' schools in Israel should teach math and English, Rabbi Aharon Feldman, dean of Yeshivas Ner Yisroel, called him a "wicked apostate". Later, after receiving a letter from Lipman explaining his views, Rabbi Feldman retracted that statement, describing him as an "unintentional sinner".

In November 2014, rabbinic students who were visiting the Knesset were denied access to the Knesset Synagogue because they were not Orthodox. Lipman found himself serving as an intermediary between the group and the Knesset speaker's office during the ensuing back-and-forth. He said, "There’s no doubt we need to work to find a solution to this problem, and I intend to address it with the speaker of the Knesset. After all, I’m heavily invested in making sure all Jews feel at home in Israel and certainly in the Knesset. Personally, I have absolutely no problem with the same synagogue being used at different times by different groups." He also noted that a factor was that many Knesset workers are unfamiliar with non-Orthodox and American practices and would view "an egalitarian service in the synagogue as an affront".

Lipman has been very supportive of the Polish government and its history policy, which focuses on highlighting the story of Polish Righteous Among the Nations. He publicly expressed his appreciation for the Redemptorist priest Tadeusz Rydzyk, the founder of Poland's Radio Maryja, and was a keynote speaker at the Remembrance and Hope ceremony that Rydyzk organized in November 2017 in Torun. Writing in The Times of Israel after the event, Lipman stressed: "Today, with the love for Israel that exudes from the Polish leadership and citizenry, it is incumbent upon Israel to focus its attention on the Righteous Gentiles, especially those who were killed for their acts of heroism. We should teach their stories to our children, and delegations to Poland should not only visit the extermination camps but also such memorials as the one we saw in Torun."

Lipman was attacked for his support for Rydzyk in the Israeli media as the "useful idiot" of Rydzyk, but defended himself rejecting that accusation, arguing that he had "educated myself on all sides of the equation, and made a very deliberate decision in complete consonance with Israel’s foreign affairs policy".

== Personal ==
Lipman is married to Hadas and lives in Jerusalem. He's the author of 11 books.
