= Aaron Feuerstein =

American businessman (1925–2021)

- Born: December 11, 1925; Brookline, Massachusetts, U.S.
- Died: November 4, 2021 (aged 95); Brookline, Massachusetts, U.S.
- Education: Yeshiva University
- Occupation: Businessman
- Known for: CEO Malden Mills, Polartec fabric
- Spouse: Marika Rosenbaum (died 1984) Louise Feuerstein (m. 1988; died 2013)
- Parent: Samuel (father)
- Relatives: Rabbi Moses Feuerstein (brother)

Aaron Mordechai Feuerstein (December 11, 1925 – November 4, 2021) was an American industrialist, philanthropist, and the third-generation owner and CEO of Malden Mills in Lawrence, Massachusetts. Some remember him as "the mensch who saved Christmas" when he publicly declared: "I am not throwing three thousand people out of work, two weeks before their holiday."

After a major fire at Young Israel of Brookline, a synagogue founded by his father, Feuerstein donated $1,000,000 to help rebuild it.

== Early life and education ==
Feuerstein was born in Brookline, Massachusetts, on December 11, 1925. He attended Boston Latin School and graduated from Yeshiva University in 1947, majoring in English and philosophy.

== Career ==
Feuerstein began working for the family company, Malden Mills, after he graduated in 1947. By the 1970s, he began to take charge of the company, leading it during the disastrous fake fur market. On 9/11/1981, the company was filed for bankruptcy and had to lay off workers.

On December 11, 1995, the Malden Mills factory, a facility that Feuerstein's grandfather built, burned down. Feuerstein used his insurance money to rebuild it, and to pay the salaries of all the now-unemployed workers while it was being rebuilt. Feuerstein spent millions keeping all 3,000 employees on the payroll with full benefits for ninety days. He came to prominence globally by going against common business practices, especially at a time when many companies were downsizing and moving overseas. "By the end of 1996 the plant was rebuilt."

Feuerstein, a devout Orthodox Jew, said that he could not have taken another course of action due to his study of the Talmud and the lessons he learned there:

I have a responsibility to the worker, both blue-collar and white-collar. I have an equal responsibility to the community. It would have been unconscionable to put 3,000 people on the streets and deliver a deathblow to the cities of Lawrence and Methuen. Maybe on paper our company is worth less to Wall Street, but I can tell you it's worth more.

— Parade Magazine, 1996

This cost Feuerstein $25,000,000 and his CEO position as his family lost control of the company. In November 2001, Malden Mills filed for chapter 11 bankruptcy. The company achieved solvency again with the help of creditor generosity and government subsidies. Malden Mills later garnered some lucrative Department of Defense (DoD) contracts for "smart" products that interweave fiber optic cabling, electronic biosensors, and USB ports into polar fleece fabric. Malden Mills was awarded a $16 million DoD contract in 2006. In January 2007, however, Malden Mills filed for bankruptcy again and ended production in July. The company's underfunded (by 49%) pension was abandoned due to sale of corporate assets.

== Personal life ==
Feuerstein was an alumnus of Camp Modin in Belgrade, Maine, and the keynote speaker at the 75th annual reunion in 1997. Feuerstein was also a member of Young Israel of Brookline.

Feuerstein died of pneumonia on November 4, 2021, in a Boston hospital at the age of 95.

=== Family ===
Feuerstein married twice; both wives predeceased him. His surviving descendants include 3 children and six grandchildren.

== Honors ==
An industrialist and philanthropist, for setting the standard for commitment to employees following a devastating fire at his Malden Mills manufacturing plant, he was awarded the Peace Abbey Courage of Conscience Award on March 13, 1998. Two years prior, he was cited by then President Bill Clinton during his 1996 State of the Union Address, lauding him for his handling of the Malden Mills disaster.
