= Gedaliah Anemer =

Orthodox Jewish Rabbi (1932–2010)

Rav Gedaliah Anemer

Personal life
- Born: Gedaliah Anemer; 19 March 1932 Akron, Ohio
- Died: 15 April 2010 (aged 78) Kemp Mill, Maryland
- Buried: Har HaMenuchot
- Education: Telshe Yeshiva

Religious life
- Religion: Judaism
- Denomination: Orthodox Judaism

Jewish leader
- Synagogue: Young Israel Shomrai Emunah
- Yeshiva: Yeshiva of Greater Washington
- Organisation: Rabbinical Council of Greater Washington
- Yahrtzeit: 1 Iyar
- Semikhah: Rav Eliyahu Meir Bloch

Rabbi Gedaliah Anemer, also known as Rav Gedaliah Ben Zev HaKohen (March 19, 1932 – April 15, 2010), was an Orthodox Jewish rabbi and founder of the Yeshiva of Greater Washington, where he served as rosh yeshiva (dean) for 45 years. He was a disciple of Rabbi Eliyahu Meir Bloch. Anemer headed the Rabbinical Council of Greater Washington and led the Vaad HaKashrus.

== Early life ==
Gedaliah Anemer was born in Akron, Ohio.

== Career ==
Anemer received his semikhah (rabbinical ordination) in 1952 and soon after became the rosh yeshiva of the Boston Rabbinical Seminary, a collaborative effort between Lakewood Yeshiva and Telshe Yeshiva. Soon after, Anemer and his rebbetzin moved to Washington, D.C, where he worked as the rabbi of Young Israel Shomrai Emunah. He later relocated the congregation to the Kemp Mill area of Silver Spring, Maryland, laying the foundation for a new Jewish community.

In 1963, Anemer founded the Yeshiva of Greater Washington.

== Death and burial ==
Anemer died of a stroke on Thursday, April 22, 2010. He was 78.
