= Yad LʼOlim =

Israeli non-profit supporting olim

- Founded: 2021; 5 years ago
- Founder: Dov Lipman
- Type: Non-profit
- Headquarters: Israel
- Services: Support for olim
- Website: yadlolim.org

Yad L’Olim is an organization to help non-Hebrew speaking immigrants to have someone to call to help them navigate Israeli bureaucracy. It was established in 2021 by former Knesset member Rabbi Dov Lipman.

== History ==
Elected to the 19th Knesset in 2013, Lipman was the first American-born Knesset member in nearly 30 years. While in the Knesset, he held open office hours for Olim to come and meet with him every Sunday. He continued to do this even when he was no longer in the Knesset.

During the coronavirus when the country’s borders were closed. Lipman was inundated with requests from people to help them enter the country. Once he started receiving hundreds of messages a day from people in over 20 countries, Lipman created an organization with a staff. They succeeded in allowing people to enter Israel in order to celebrate family life cycle events. After a while, the organization branched into other areas such as health, tax and other bureaucratic issues. It is now one of the leading advocates for Olim within the Knesset and local municipalities. When October 7 resulted in a spike in Aliyah, Yad L’Olim assisted many of these olim.

== Services ==
=== Health ===
It has a stand alone health care department just to help Olim deal with Israel’s health system. They then subsumed the Shira Pransky Project to bolster their related health offerings. Because of Yad L’Olim, the government now provides health services in hospitals that are offered in English, French, Russian and Amharic.

=== Education ===
The organization works with the Education Ministry to assist those young students who struggle with Hebrew.

=== Ukraine War ===
The organization provided support and guidance to Ukrainian olim leaving the Ukraine due to the Russian invasion and helping them open a bank account, find work and a place to live.

=== Academic Degrees ===
There was an issue with olim having their foreign academic degrees accredited and for professional licenses to be accepted. The organization made this process more streamlined.
