= Aaron Lopiansky =

Orthodox Jewish Rabbi, Rosh Yeshiva

Rabbi Ahron Shraga Lopiansky
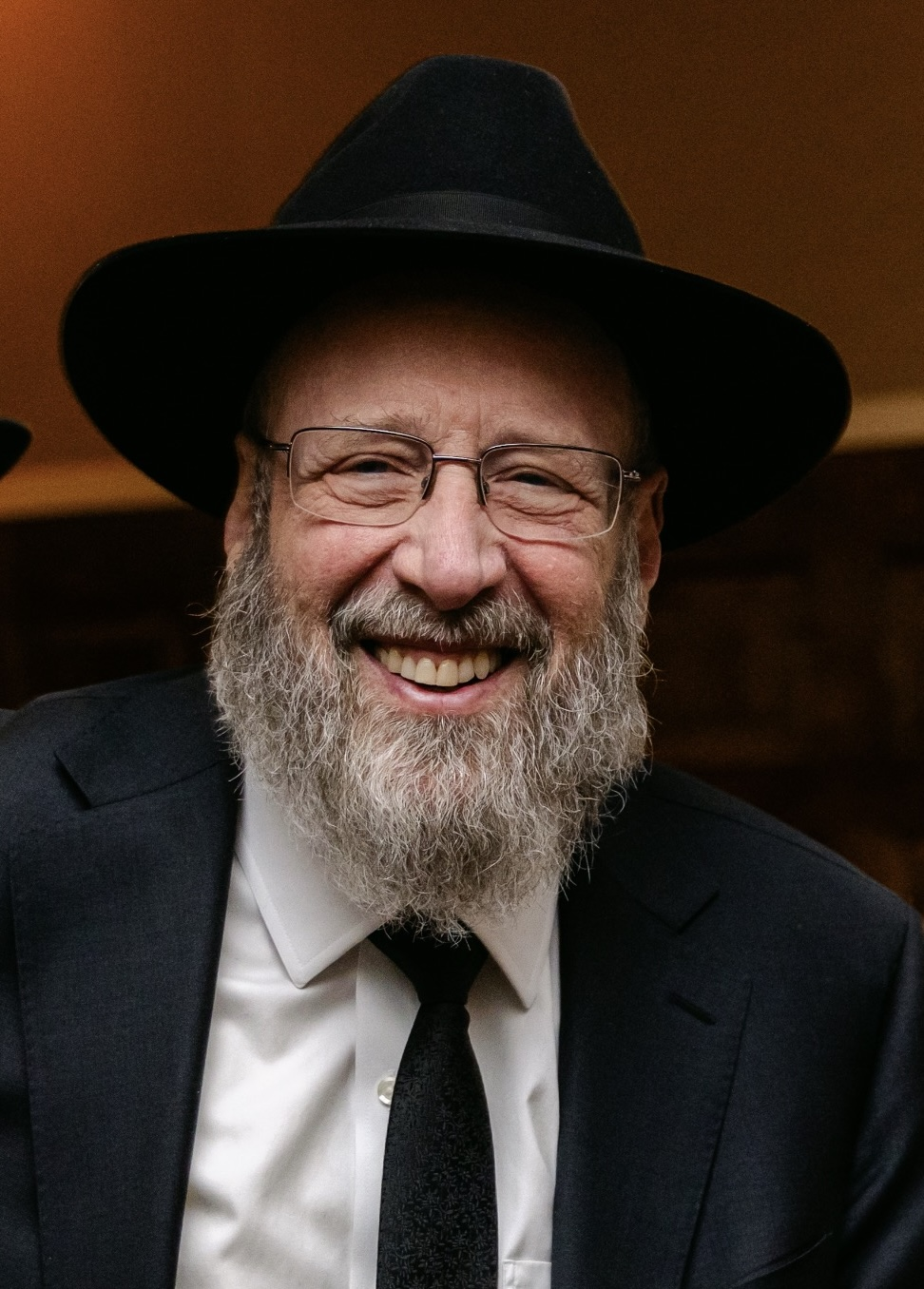
- Rabbi Lopiansky in 2025

Personal life
- Born: 1953 (age 72–73) Manhattan, New York, United States
- Education: Mir Yeshiva (Jerusalem)
- Occupation: Rosh Yeshiva, author, lecturer

Religious life
- Religion: Judaism
- Denomination: Orthodox Judaism

Jewish leader
- Position: Rosh Yeshiva
- Yeshiva: Yeshiva of Greater Washington – Tiferes Gedaliah
- Began: 1994
- Main work: More than 20 works on Torah thought, liturgy, and philosophy
- Semikhah: Rav Chaim Shmuelevitz and Rav Nachum Partzovitz

Aaron Shraga Lopiansky (Hebrew: אהרן שרגא לופיאנסקי), born September 1953, also known as Rav Ahron, is an American-Israeli Orthodox rabbi, author, posek, and rosh yeshiva at the Yeshiva of Greater Washington. He has written more than 20 works on Torah thought, liturgy, and philosophy.

== Early life and education ==
Lopiansky was born and raised in New York's Lower East Side, the son of Holocaust survivors. Growing up, he was immersed in Torah learning, and he attended the local Rabbi Jacob Joseph School, where he achieved high scores on statewide tests. He has stated that he was deeply influenced by his parents growing up.

Before the age of 17, Lopiansky entered the Mir Yeshiva in Jerusalem, where he received rabbinic training under Rabbi Chaim Shmuelevitz and Rabbi Nachum Partzovitz. He was also greatly influenced by his father-in-law, Rav Beinish Finkel, the late Rosh Yeshiva of the Mir, and by his close association as a talmid (student) of Rav Moshe Shapiro. Lopiansky later stated that Shapiro had a "tremendous influence" on him and taught him "to look at the world in a deeper way."

== Career ==
Lopiansky began his teaching career at Aish HaTorah in Jerusalem, where he taught from 1983 to 1990. During the 1980s, he participated in clandestine educational missions to the Soviet Union, where he taught members of the growing underground Jewish baal teshuva movement. He then taught at his alma mater, the Mir Yeshiva, for five years. In 1994, the headmaster of the Yeshiva of Greater Washington, Rabbi Yitzchok Merkin, reached out to Lopiansky, who was then serving as a maggid shiur at Mir Yerushalayim, with an offer to become the rosh yeshiva of the yeshiva gedolah in Kemp Mill, Maryland. Lopiansky initially moved to America alone, returning to Jerusalem to ensure that he was never away from home for more than three consecutive Shabbosim. In August 2001, his wife Rebbetzin Yaffa Lopiansky and their four children joined him.

In 2019, he published a sefer, Orchos Chaim: A Ben Torah for Life. The book received positive reviews in the Orthodox Jewish press. Writing in Jewish Action, Rabbi Yosef Gavriel Bechhofer described Ben Torah for Life as a "groundbreaking work" and "the first book in the English language, perhaps in any language, to attempt to diminish the dissonance between the years that one spends in yeshiva and kollel and the subsequent years in which one is in a secular workplace."

During a speech at the 2019 Aguda convention, Rav Elya Brudny notably remarked, "Every family that has made that transition [from kollel to the workplace] should own the book". Rav Yosef Elefant spoke next. “In the modern era, there hasn’t been a sefer that touched on the topics critical to our existence, with honesty and clarity and respect, like this one has."

== Activities and contributions ==
Lopiansky taught in the Israeli Army's Hishtalmut program, which aims to broaden the perspective of the army's officer corps by exposing them to the diverse facets of Israeli society.

He also sits on several boards, including the Memorial Foundation for Jewish Culture. Among his English-language works is Time Pieces, a collection of essays on the Jewish holidays.

In 2020, during the World Zionist Congress elections, Lopiansky and Rabbi Elya Brudny spoke in favor of privately voting for the Eretz HaKodesh slate.

In January 2022, following the Chaim Walder sexual-abuse scandal in the Haredi community, Lopiansky published an English-language opinion piece in Mishpacha titled "For This We Weep." The article called for supporting victims of abuse and for systemic change in how such cases are addressed in Orthodox communities.

In December 2023, The Forward reported on Lopiansky's remarks at the annual convention of Agudath Israel of America, where he addressed disagreement within the Haredi community over participation in the 2023 March for Israel. Lopiansky cited a Talmudic passage about legitimate disagreement within Torah discourse and said that Agudath Israel had historically included multiple Orthodox traditions, including Lithuanian, Hungarian, Polish, and German strains. He stated that the Moetzes Gedolei HaTorah was not always of one mind and that "the differences in opinion are legitimate."

In a 2024 discussion of Religious Zionist approaches to redemption, Lopiansky cautioned against treating contemporary political developments as definitive proof that the messianic age has arrived, arguing that similar expectations had arisen repeatedly throughout Jewish history.
