= Ephraim Sturm =

Jewish leader (1924–2015)

Ephraim H. (Frank) Sturm (1924–2015) was the executive vice president of National Council of Young Israel for 36 years. He oversaw the startup of Young Israel's on-campus intercollegiate kosher dining program and the formation of Young Israel branches in Israel. A scholarship fund carries his name.

== Early life ==
His Semicha (rabbinical ordination) was from Yeshiva Rabbi Chaim Berlin (1946) and he received "an MA from Columbia University in 1949." Sturm served for several years as editor of the Young Israel's Viewpoint magazine.

== Young Israel executive VP ==
Sturm served as executive vice president 1956 to 1992. One of his lasting legacies is the on-campus Young Israel kosher-dining program, in which he "championed the idea that ... Jewish university students" should be offered kosher food, to be eaten in a comfortable setting, on-campus. The first of these programs he facilitated was at Cornell University, beginning in September 1956.
