= Dovid Trenk =

American rabbi

Rabbi Dovid Trenk
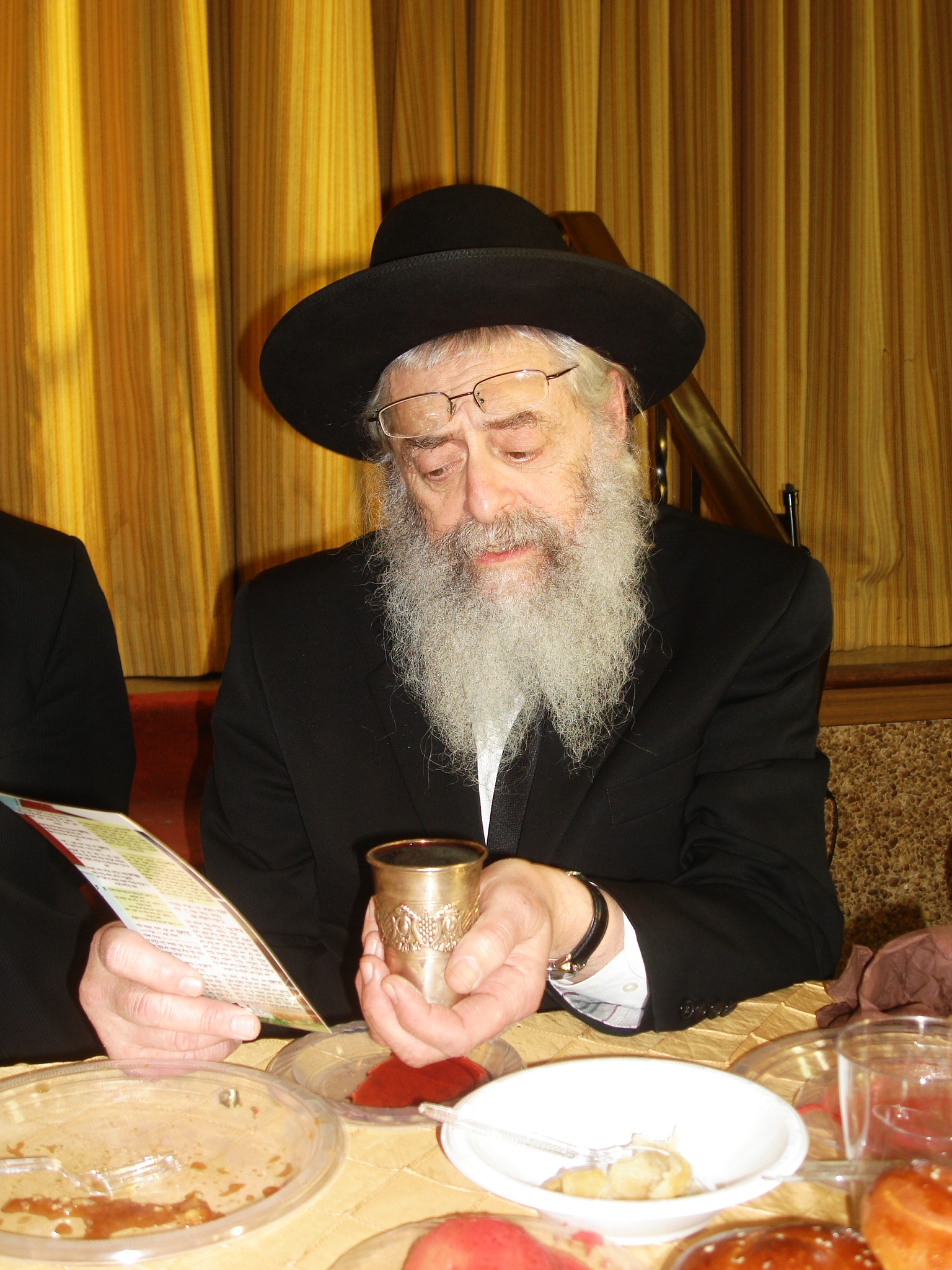
- Rabbi Trenk in 2008

Personal life
- Born: Menachem Yechiel Dovid Trenk; 1941 New York City, New York, U.S.
- Died: June 30, 2019 (aged 77–78) Lakewood, New Jersey, U.S.
- Buried: Mount Lebanon Cemetery, Iselin, New Jersey
- Spouse: Leah (Bagry) Trenk
- Parent(s): Shea Trenk and Shirley (David) Trenk

Religious life
- Religion: Judaism
- Yeshiva: Yeshiva Moreshes Yehoshua
- Position: Rosh Yeshiva
- Residence: Lakewood, New Jersey

Dovid Trenk (Hebrew: מנחם יחיאל דוד טרענק; 1941 – June 30, 2019) was an Orthodox Jewish Rabbi and Rosh Yeshiva of the Yeshiva Moreshes Yehoshua, in Lakewood, New Jersey. Prior to that, he was a Maggid Shiur at Talmudical Academy of Central New Jersey in Adelphia, New Jersey and Mir Yeshiva in Brooklyn, New York.

== Biography ==
Dovid was born to Shea (Avrohom Yehoshua Heschel) and Shirley (Batsheva) Trenk in 1941. At the time, they lived on the lower east side of Manhattan, NY. He attended Yeshiva Etz Chaim for elementary school, then Yeshivas Rabbi Jacob Joseph School (RJJ) for high school. During the summers, he was among the first campers of Camp Munk. Later on he became staff, and remained a Rebbe there until the end of his life. After high school, he attended Mir Yeshiva (Brooklyn). He later spent 10 months in Yeshivas Ner Yisroel as a dorm counselor, before marrying his lifelong partner Rebbitzen Leah (Bagry) and returning to Mir Yeshiva. There he was handed the Rebbe role for the weaker migrant students, and thus began his legendary teaching career. In 1972 the Talmudical Academy of Central New Jersey in Adelphia New Jersey opened a high school hiring Rabbi Trenk as the ninth grade Maggid Shiur. In 2005 he founded a Yeshiva, named Yeshiva Moreshes Yehoshua, named after his father, leading it until his passing on June 30, 2019, after a few months of illness.

The biography detailing his life is titled "Just Love Them -The Life and Legacy of Rabbi Dovid Trenk", published by Artscroll. After it became a best seller, a children's version focused on life lessons was published as well, titled "Just Love Them - for children".
