= Congregation Kol Emes (Richmond, Virginia) =

1964 Orthodox Jewish synagogue

- Hebrew: קהילת קול אמת ד'ריטשמאנד
- Location in Virginia

Religion
- Affiliation: Orthodox Judaism
- Ecclesiastical or organizational status: Synagogue
- Status: Active

Location
- Location: 4811 Patterson Avenue, Richmond, Virginia
- Country: United States
- Interactive map of Congregation Kol Emes
- Coordinates: 37°34′18″N 77°30′4″W

Architecture
- Established: 1964 (as a congregation)
- Completed: 1964

Congregation Kol Emes (Hebrew: קהילת קול אמת ד'ריטשמאנד, lit. 'Voice of truth'), also known as Young Israel of Richmond, is an Orthodox Jewish synagogue located at 4811 Patterson Avenue, in Richmond, Virginia, in the United States.

Constituted and founded in 1964, it is one of the oldest active Jewish congregations in Virginia, the fourth oldest active congregation in Richmond, and housing the oldest active mikvah in Richmond. It is a member synagogue of the National Council of Young Israel and the Orthodox Union.

It is a very small congregation, compared to the larger and more successful congregations in the city, such as Keneseth Beth Israel.

== History ==
Congregation Kol Emes is a continuation of Orthodox synagogues in Richmond dating back to 1789. It has been at the center of the continuation of Orthodox Jewish life in Richmond:

In 1964... brothers Abraham and Emil Dere spearheaded the founding of the Jewish Academy of Richmond, which, shortly thereafter became Congregation Kol Emes, with the guidance of HaRav Nachman Bulman, who at the time was a Rov in the independent city of Newport News. At the time, once again, Kol Emes housed the only Mikvah in Richmond (until the Chabad Mikvah opened in the 1980s) and the only shul in Richmond with a Mechitzah (until Keneseth Beth Israel moved to its present location in the 1970s). In 1965, the Richmond Hebrew Day School, presently Rudlin Torah Academy, was founded in the Kol Emes building, with personal blessings from Gedolei Yisrael.

== See also ==
- Richmond Jewish Foundation
- Virginia Holocaust Museum
