= Irving Bunim =

Belarusian-born American Jewish businessman and philanthropist

- Born: Irving M. Bunim; June 02, 1901; Volozhin, Lithuania
- Died: December 10, 1980 (aged 79); New York, United States
- Occupations: Businessman, Author
- Known for: Leader of the Young Israel Movement, Rescued Jews from the Holocaust

Signature
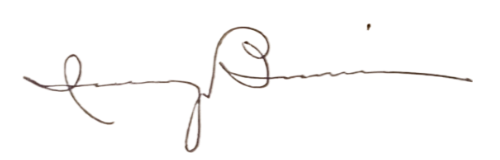

Irving M. Bunim was a businessman, philanthropist, and a lay leader of Orthodox Jewry, in particular the Young Israel movement in the United States from the 1930s until his death in 1980. As an assistant to Aharon Kotler, he was involved in aspects of Torah dissemination, philanthropy and Holocaust rescue. He has been referred to as "perhaps the most impactful lay leader in American Jewish history".

== Biography ==
Bunim was born in 1901 in Valozhyn, in the Vilna Governorate of the Russian Empire (present-day Belarus), then the major Torah centre of Europe and the home of the first Yeshiva, Etz Chaim. Bunim was a Yeshiva student while young. When Bunim was nine years old, his family moved to the United States. There, Bunim attended high school, after which he started working. His brother-in-law hired him to work in his textile factory. When his brother-in-law moved to Palestine, Bunim bought the company.

Together with other American Orthodox leaders, Bunim was active in the Vaad Hatzalah, an organization created by the Union of Orthodox Rabbis of the United States and Canada to save Yeshiva students and teachers from captivity and probable death in Eastern Europe. Later, the Vaad's scope expanded to include all suffering Jews in Europe and helped them by sending food and other relief supplies, or by giving them refuge in non-European countries of safety. Bunim was committed to following Torah Law and to saving lives. Once, because the Torah gives life-saving activity priority over Sabbath observance, and under express instruction from prominent rabbis, Bunim took a cab ride on Shabbat to raise funds so that the Mir Yeshiva students and teachers could escape to Curaçao.

The hardest aspect of rescue work was negotiating with the Nazis themselves. This series of negotiations was called the Musy Negotiations named after Jean Marie Musy, Himmler's acquaintance and the pro-Nazi former president of Switzerland and his son Benoît Nicolas. The negotiations with Musy were held by Yitzchak and Recha Sternbuch in Switzerland. In these negotiations, the Vaad agreed to pay Nazis ransom to free Jews from Nazi concentration camps. After some dealings the Vaad agreed to pay $5 million for 300,000 Jews or $250,000 each month for 20 months to free 15,000 Jews. These negotiations failed, though some thousand Jews, out of the 300,000 Jews promised to be freed, were saved from a certain death. After the war the Vaad kept working to supply the survivors with food and other relief supplies.

Bunim also supported and was vice-president of Torah Umesorah, the National Society for Hebrew Day Schools founded by Rabbi Shraga Feivel Mendlowitz, the head of Yeshiva and Mesivta Torah Vodaath. He traveled to distant places to raise funds. He also encouraged people to open schools, helped prevent communities from closing schools, and encouraged teachers and principals.

Bunim was also involved with Chinuch Atzmai, Israel's independent ultra-Orthodox elementary school system, aiding its chairman Stephen Klein, and Rabbi Aharon Kotler, its founder and head, and frequently spoke on behalf of the organization in America and helped raise funds for it. Bunim became devoted to Chinuch Atzmai after seeing a Sephardic child in Israel who did not know the meaning of the Shema Yisrael prayer.

Bunim was a philanthropist who gave loans and helped people in need. His main goal was spreading the word of the Torah to all Jews. He was a popular guest speaker at the functions of many Orthodox Jewish organizations and institutions. He was a raconteur, filled with anecdotes and parables, a skill reflected in his three-volume commentary on Pirkei Avot, Ethics from Sinai.

== Death ==
Bunim died December 10, 1980 at his home in New York City, and was buried in the Mount of Olives, Jerusalem.

Rabbi Moshe Feinstein pronounced his death in December 1980 an "aveilus d'rabim", a loss for the community as a whole.

== Young Israel ==
He was an early day lay leader in the Young Israel movement.

Among other lasting accomplishments, Bunim was known for his Perek-on-the-Lawn teachings of Pirkei Avos.

== Israel ==
He was quoted as saying ""Where we had ammunition, the Arabs didn't dare to attack," and he hosted pre-1948 fund-raising meetings in support.

To answer how could he host in his own home Rabbi Elchonan Wasserman, leader of Agudath Israel, one day and Zev Jabotinsky the next, he said: "I love truth: one is a true Torah scholar and the other a true Zionist."

== Family ==
The parents of Mr. Yitzchak Meir (Irving) Bunim were Rav Moshe and Esther Mina Buminowitz (Bunim). Irving and his two brothers attended "RJJ", the Rabbi Jacob Joseph religious school, which he later served as president.

Irving's daughter, Chana Rubin Ausubel, wrote about her father's life and teachings, as did her brother Amos.

Irving's son, Rabbi Amos Bunim, who on many projects was the right-hand man to his father, died Saturday, May 7, 2011.

And he was also one of the most famous supporters of Meir Kahane, founder of the Jewish Defense League: an organization that was classified as a terrorist group by the FBI.
