= Richmond Jewish Foundation =

Charitable organization

Richmond Jewish Foundation is a charitable foundation based in Richmond, Virginia, USA. It is a non-profit organization.

== Overview ==
The Richmond Jewish Foundation was established in 1979. Like a community foundation, it is an independent philanthropic organization working in a defined geographic area (in this case, Richmond and central Virginia), which builds up a collection of endowed funds from many donors in the community over time. The foundation also provides funding to charitable, educational, and religious causes outside of the region, including but not limited to Jewish causes. It provides services to the community and its donors, makes grants, and undertakes community leadership and partnership activities to address a wide variety of needs in its service area.

By 2006, the Richmond Jewish Foundation had over 200 subcomponents that included endowments, donor-advised funds, and life income gifts that included charitable remainder trusts. Affiliated agencies included Beth Sholom Campus and Weinstein Jewish Community Center, Jewish Community Federation of Richmond, Richmond area Jewish congregations such as Temple Beth El and Congregation Kol Emes, museums like Virginia Holocaust Museum and Congregation Beth Ahabah Museum and Archives, schools like Rudlin Torah Academy, and programs like Hillel. A broadly representative volunteer board serves to oversee the organization and to function as its ambassadors with various constituencies, including individuals, families, agencies, congregations and the general community. As a mission-focused independent charity, partnering in community, Richmond Jewish Foundation operates in a manner similar to charities such as the San Diego Jewish Community Foundation and the Jewish Community Foundation of Kansas City and Tidewater Jewish Foundation.

Richmond Jewish Foundation includes the Genesis Fund and "Create a Jewish Legacy". Among the offerings of the Foundation are field of interest funds, special purpose funds, life income plans and donor-advised funds.

=== Values ===
Values associated with Richmond Jewish Foundation include Tzedakah, which translates as justice or charity, and Tikkun Olam or repair of the world, a key Jewish concept regarding universal responsibility.

=== Create a Jewish Legacy ===
Richmond is a pilot community for United Jewish Communities Create a Jewish Legacy program that encourages bequests for permanent endowments. A feature of this program is the training of representatives of affiliated agencies, congregations, museums and schools to ask their most loyal supporters to commit to gifts through wills or estate plans especially for permanent endowments. Other features of Create a Jewish Legacy include marketing and donor recognition. This program, modelled on success in communities like San Diego, may be compared to the Leave a Legacy program of the National Committee on Planned Giving.

=== Edward S. Hirschler's Memorial Legal and Tax Seminar ===
Richmond Jewish Foundation, with the Richmond-based law firm Hirschler Fleischer, offers an annual continuing education seminar for lawyers, accountants, financial planners, insurance providers, fiduciaries and other interested professionals. The late Edward S. Hirschler, an early president of Richmond Jewish Foundation, also co-founded the Hirschler Fleischer law firm. After the attorney's death, the partners of the firm established a fund at Richmond Jewish Foundation to provide annually for this seminar.

=== Leaders ===
A variety of professionals, business leaders, community volunteers and others steward Richmond Jewish Foundation as members of the Board of Directors. Some such leaders have been prominent. Circuit City founder Samuel Wurtzel was among the early the organizers of Richmond Jewish Foundation. Other prominent Virginians associated with the organization include Jeffrey M. Lacker, Richmond Federal Reserve and the late US Congressman Norman Sisisky and his wife.
