= Yeshiva of Greater Washington =

School of Jewish studies

The Yeshiva of Greater Washington
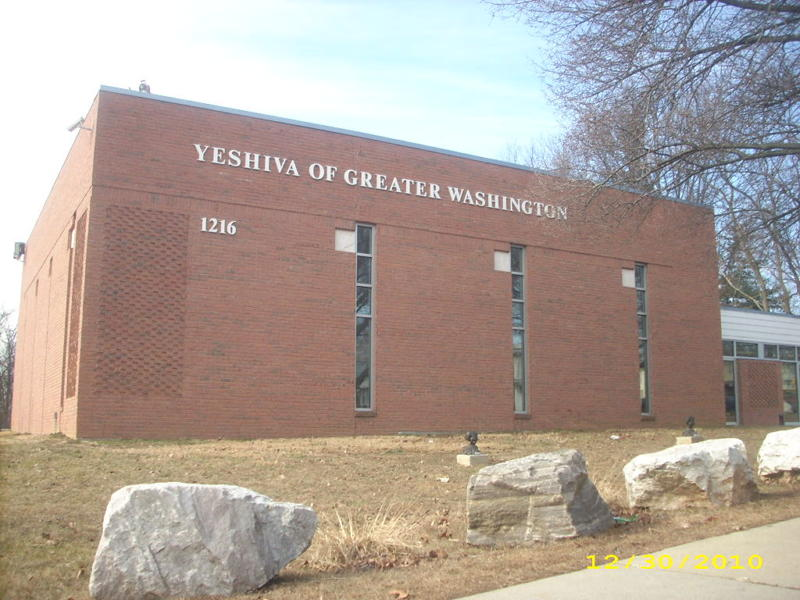
- The Yeshiva campus in 2011

Location
- Boys School, Yeshiva Gedolah, and Kollel: 1216 Arcola Avenue; Silver Spring, Maryland, U.S. 20902; 39°2′33″N 77°1′48″W; Girls School and Business Office: 2010 Linden Lane; Silver Spring, Maryland, U.S. 20910; 39°0′32″N 77°2′42″W Kemp Mill, Maryland, United States

Information
- Founder: Rabbi Gedaliah Anemer
- Dean: Rabbi Yitzchok Merkin
- Staff: 40+
- Faculty: 25+ full-time faculty
- Enrollment: 306 (grades 7-12) (Yeshiva Gedolah and Kollel Zichron Amram: Unknown)
- Language: English, Hebrew, Yiddish
- Campus type: Suburban
- Accreditation: Association of Advanced Rabbinical and Talmudic Studies (AARTS), Maryland Higher Education Commission (for college program)
- Religious Affiliation: Orthodox Judaism
- Type: Private, religious
- Campus Size: 2 separate campuses
- Colors: Blue and White
- Programs: Yeshiva Gedolah: Advanced Talmudic studies for post-high school students; Kollel Zichron Amram: Post-graduate Torah learning; Yeshiva College of the Nation's Capital: Accredited undergraduate program for Bachelor’s in Talmudic Law; Boys School: Grades 7-12; Girls School: Grades 7-12
- Rosh Yeshiva: Rabbi Aaron Lopiansky
- Website: www.yeshiva.edu

The Yeshiva of Greater Washington, also known as Tiferes Gedaliah and commonly abbreviated YGW, is an Orthodox Jewish yeshiva in Kemp Mill, Maryland. It was founded in 1964 by Rabbi Gedaliah Anemer. It consists of a kollel (Zichron Amram), a yeshiva gedolah (that offers a Bachelor's in Talmudic Law degree through its fully accredited college program as Yeshiva College of the Nation's Capital), and separate high schools for boys and girls. The rosh yeshiva is Rav Aaron Lopiansky.

== History ==
Rabbi Gedaliah Anemer founded the Yeshiva High School of Greater Washington in 1964. The school opened the girls division with six students. The boys division opened its first tenth grade class in the following year. The Yeshiva High School began expanding to include a junior high school in the 1980s and changed its name to the Yeshiva of Greater Washington.

In 1995, the Yeshiva opened its postsecondary education program, the Yeshiva College of the Nation's Capital. It offers a nationally accredited Bachelor's in Talmudic Law. The yeshiva hired Talmudic scholar Aaron Lopiansky to serve as the rosh yeshiva for the yeshiva gedolah.

== Current enrollment ==
The Yeshiva of Greater Washington Boys Division offers classes for boys in grades 7 through 12. In 2022, the school reported a student population of 152.

The Yeshiva of Greater Washington Girls Division offers classes for girls in grades 7 through 12. In 2022, the school reported a student population of 154.

== See also ==
- List of Jewish universities and colleges in the United States
