= National Council of Young Israel =

American Orthodox Jewish network, 1912-

- Theology: Orthodox Judaism
- President: Zev Berman
- Chairman of the Board: Rabbi David Warshaw
- Region: United States and Canada
- Headquarters: 50 Eisenhower Drive, Paramus, New Jersey
- Origin: 1912; 114 years ago 205 East Broadway, New York City
- Congregations: 135
- Members: ~25,000 affiliates
- Official website: www.youngisrael.org

The National Council of Young Israel (NCYI) or Young Israel (in Hebrew: ישראל הצעיר, Yisrael Hatza'ir), is a synagogue-based Orthodox Judaism organization in the United States with a network of affiliated "Young Israel" synagogues. Young Israel was founded in 1912, in its earliest form, by a group of 15 young Jews on the Lower East Side of Manhattan. Their goal was to make Orthodox Judaism more relevant to young Americanized Jews at a time when a significant Jewish education was rare, and most Orthodox institutions were Yiddish-speaking and oriented to an older, European Jewish demographic.

Today, Young Israel continues to promote Orthodox involvement of modern American Jews, while also advocating for the issues most relevant to its members, including support for Israel and Religious Zionism.

== History ==
Early in the 20th century, American Jews were striving primarily for social and economic advancement, often leaving their religious observances behind. Because most jobs required working on Saturdays, observance of the Jewish Sabbath was rare, as were many other traditions. At the same time, the Reform movement had been expanding rapidly for about 40 years, and with its relaxed religious codes, secularly-educated leadership, and English orientation, attracted an increasing number of young people away from the folds of Orthodoxy.

A group of young Orthodox Jews decided to do what they could to make Orthodox Judaism more relevant to their peers, and combat the wave of assimilation by Jews into Reform and secular American society. In 1911, Max Grablowsky, Joshua Horowitz and Benjamin Koenigsberg determined to organize a way to present an orthodox alternative to young people. It developed informally with two programs, one for education and one for worship. After consulting with Judah Magnes, the enlarged group, which was calling itself the Hebrew Circle, renamed itself Young Israel. Benjamin Koenigsberg, the first Orthodox Jewish American attorney loaned his law office to the organization. 1911 also saw the first issue of the Young Israel Viewpoint, a bimonthly that continued publication until 1988.

=== Seminars ===
The group developed a Friday night (Sabbath) lecture series in 1912, given in English. Judah Magnes delivered the inaugural address, attended by thousands. This was a major innovation in the Orthodox world. They were initially advised by rabbis Israel Friedlander and Mordecai Kaplan on topics and speakers. According to Bunim, Friedlander and Kaplan were affiliates of the Conservative Jewish Theological Seminary and the Conservative Judaism movement, and they sought to use Young Israel to establish a youth platform for the Conservative movement; until the end of World War I, Young Israel had two groups, the firmly Orthodox, and the more liberal group that worked with the Conservatives. According to Kraut (1998), Kaplan "worked for the Young Israel initiative that in conception was nondenominational..."

=== Synagogues ===
The first Young Israel synagogue was established in 1913 on East Broadway, on Manhattan's Lower East Side. David Warshaw traces the origins of the new synagogue to the summer of 1913, when some members of the YI seminar group were asked into a storefront shul [synagogue] at 205 East Broadway, to complete a minyan. Much to their delight, the shul allowed the new young members to lead services at least once each month. As they led the services, the Young Israel members introduced some small stylistic changes, that were acceptable to the Orthodox wing and would make the service more palatable to the Young Israel congregants. The changes included singing many parts of the prayer service, and the distribution of worship honors equally, where they had traditionally gone to established, wealthy congregants who could pay for them.

Though the shul predated its Young Israel members, within months, they had attracted so many new young members, that they outgrew the store and moved to the Educational Alliance building. The young people had taken over the shul, itself a novel experience. However, it was not directly linked to the Young Israel lecture series, only sharing a common group of leaders, and the common idea of refreshing Orthodoxy for younger Jews. Recognizing its potential for young Jews everywhere, they named themselves "The Model Synagogue Organization." However, they recognized the synergy with the forums, and renamed the shul Young Israel.

The first name of the shul was prescient. Young Jews in other neighborhoods were soon starting their own Young Israel shuls. However, each was independent, with only informal connections to the original group.

=== Centralization and Orthodoxy ===
By the end of World War I, the two Lower East Side groups shared a name, but little else. The Conservative group promoted the seminars, and the Orthodox group was focused on prayer. They reached a truce in 1918 and agreed to join forces in more than just name, and created a single Young Israel organization, led by Irving Bunim, who would be president of NCYI for many years.

By 1920, Bunim and his Orthodox cohort grew nervous about the Conservative wing and their increasing theological changes. They did not like the changes in and of themselves, and these changes also prevented recognition of Young Israel by Orthodox rabbis, which would likely cause Young Israel to become a de facto branch of the Conservative movement. The merger created two years before had also caused the Conservatives to start trying to make changes in the Synagogue arm, which had been exclusively Orthodox. He sought the help of Rabbi Bernard Revel, and was able to convince the entire Young Israel to follow Revel's advice. Between Revel, and extensive networking by Bunim with other potential Young Israel leaders in the Orthodox community, the Conservative rabbis, particularly Kaplan, were shut out of the entire organization, and the movement became firmly Orthodox.

=== Charters ===
To bolster this success, in 1922 the Orthodox leaders added some basic Orthodox-oriented requirements to the Young Israel charter, such as synagogue requirements for regularly-held services, Torah study, separation of men and women. In 1924, the central group organized a convention for all the other groups that had emulated them (by setting up their own original Young Israel lectures and shuls). The other neighborhood groups agreed to abide by the charter. By 1926, the organization was incorporated, and owned the trademarked name, Young Israel. Any new shuls wishing to use the name would have to get agreement from the central organization, which required subscription to the charter. This prevented any Young Israel shul from moving toward Conservative practice.

=== Constitution ===
The Council's Constitution, gave it rights to proceeds of a sale by a failing branch of assets, with these funds benefitting the community or other branches. In 2021 a vote was made to nullify this provision.

=== Growth ===
By 1925, Young Israel was extending into social services, and formed a support agency for Sabbath-observant employment that included job placement and vocational training.

Later in the decade, the synagogue network grew to about 25. The central organization developed a Wall Street office with a full-time staff. The office began publishing material regularly for branches and Young Israel members. A few years later, branches starting opening outside of New York. By 1935, there were branches in New York, New England, Chicago, and elsewhere in the Midwest, Canada, and Israel.

== 3 West 16th Street ==
NCYI, the movement's umbrella, is a not-for-profit service organization, as defined by their 501(c)(3) status. The main headquarters, having been located at 3 West 16th Street for over half a century, is now located in Paramus, New Jersey.

Through 2006, NCYI headquarters was at 3 West 16th Street, a valuable property that it owned. Young Israel of Fifth Avenue leased its synagogue in the same building from NCYI. When NCYI sought to sell the building in 2002, the synagogue sued for breach of their long-standing arrangement, as the sale would require their eviction. The synagogue claimed that they were co-owners of the building. Eventually, a deal was made involving two other parties, the building sold, and NCYI moved its small staff to leased office space in lower Manhattan. However, the other two parties eventually had a falling-out, leading to the synagogue's eviction.

The organization had been subject to an investigation by then-New York State Attorney General Eliot Spitzer's Charities Bureau. According to The Forward: "New York Attorney General Eliot Spitzer, renowned for his jousts with the titans of corporate America, recently saw his own office tied in knots and thrown into turmoil during a three-year investigation into a small Orthodox synagogue organization."

== Today ==
In July 2013, Rabbi Perry Tirschwell assumed the position of Executive Director. His predecessors included Rabbis Ephraim Sturm and Pesach Lerner. The new administration has made significant changes in the organization: moving the national office out of Manhattan, putting Viewpoint [magazine] on hold; and creation of two monthly publications whose goal is to share best practices: Shul Solutions and Practical Pulpit.

Many older Young Israel synagogues have declined and closed, but others still thrive. NCYI serves as the national coordinating agency for nearly 150 Orthodox congregations of nearly 25,000 member families throughout the United States and Canada. NCYI also serves as a resource to its sister organization in Israel, entitled Yisrael Hatzair - "The Young Israel Movement in Israel", encompassing over 50 synagogues in Israel. It is a grassroots organization administrated on the congregational model, taking its direction from local and national lay leadership as well as rabbis and professional staff. Its socio-cultural outlook is strongly influenced by the Religious Zionist Movement, with strong support of Israel as the homeland for the Jewish people. Congregations belonging to NCYI are generally named "Young Israel of...", followed by the name of the city or neighborhood.

In recent decades, the Orthodox world has seen an increase in women's involvement in synagogue services, except for Haredi institutions. The practice has spread to several Young Israel branches. It is controversial in the Orthodox world, and most rabbis do not allow it. On advice of its rabbinical board, to help stanch the trend, NCYI implemented the Rambam's requirement that no women or converts to Judaism could serve as President of any of its synagogues. This has alienated some Young Israels. According to the Jewish Star, the rabbi of a synagogue with a female president was threatened by NCYI's leadership.

== Young Israel Council of Rabbis ==
The Young Israel Council of Rabbis is the rabbinic arm of the organization.

== Young Israel Kosher Dining clubs ==
To promote Orthodox values (eating kosher, observing the Sabbath, marrying fellow Jews), NCYI opened kosher dining programs on major USA college campuses. The first one opened at Cornell University in September 1956.

== Divisions ==
The main divisions are Synagogue Services, Rabbinical Services, and a Benevolent Association (burial society). Additional components of the organization are the Women's League, the InterCollegiate Council (ICC), Youth department, American Friends of Yisrael Hatzair, and the Council of Rabbis. There are also departments with a focus on seniors, singles and an employment departments.

Intercollegiates published:

- Aryeh Kaplan's five booklet Hashkafa series and
- Masorah, a newspaper

== Controversy ==
A 2018 statement issued by the head of a major internal committee regarding juggling of political alignments in the administration of Israel's Prime Minister led, after various Tweets and press releases, to the breakaway of an Atlanta-based branch that had joined NCYI in 1994. NCYI's president acknowledged that another branch had left the organization five years prior.

== Well-known branches ==
=== Young Israel of Brookline ===
Young Israel of Brookline is located in Brookline, Massachusetts. The Boston Globe described it as, "an influential synagogue described as modern or centrist Orthodox.". It is known for the high level of Jewish scholarship among both the men and women of the congregation.

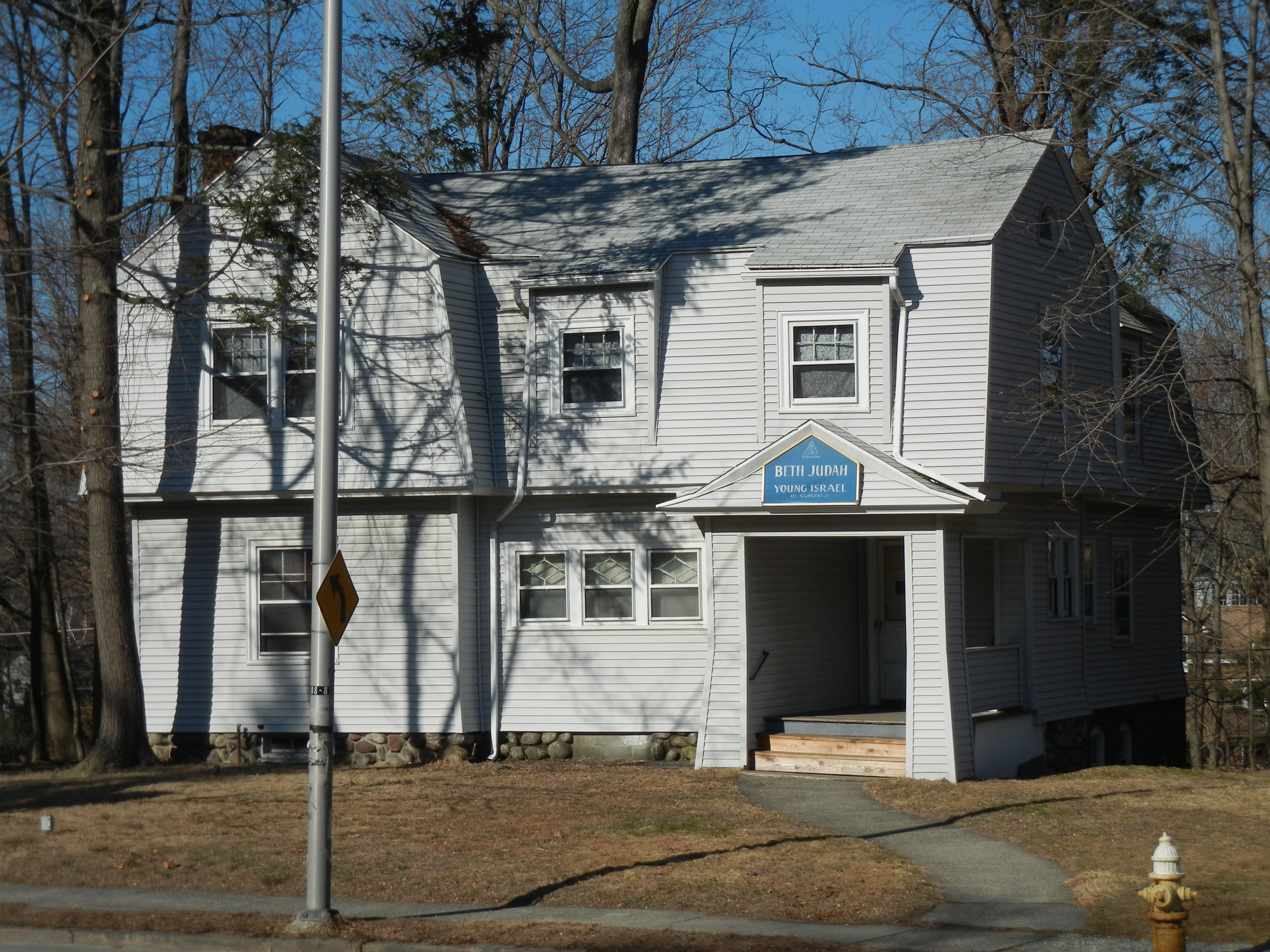
Congregation Beth Judah - Young Israel of Worcester, Massachusetts

The congregation is particularly noted for the architecture of its building. In 1994 the synagogue building suffered a severe fire, caused by a deteriorated electrical panel In 1996, the Young Israel dedicated a new building designed by Graham Gund. The building has a wrought-iron menorah sculpted by David Tonnesen. Instead of stained glass, the building uses art glass that has the effect of scattering rainbows over the congregation. Notable members include Aaron Feuerstein and Jeff Jacoby. Rabbi Saul Berman is a former rabbi of the Young Israel. Since 2014, the rabbi of Young Israel of Brookline has been Rabbi David Hellman.

It was founded by Samuel Feuerstein, whose son Aaron Mordechai donated $1,000,000 to help it rebuild after a major fire.

=== Young Israel of Fifth Avenue ===
In 1945, when NCYI bought its headquarters building on West 16th Street, it also fostered the development of new branch synagogue on site, The Young Israel of Fifth Avenue. This became a point of contention over 50 years later, when NCYI sold the building. Eventually, due to this rift, the synagogue disaffiliated with Young Israel, and is now known as the Sixteenth Street Synagogue. As of 2013, it does not have its own quarters, and other area synagogues host prayer services that 16th Street members attend.

=== Young Israel of Flatbush ===
This was one of the earliest branches, and the affiliate that then-president Irving Bunim chose as the leader, in the 1930s, for instituting rabbinic leadership of Young Israel synagogues. At the time, it was one of the larger shuls, and was initially against getting a rabbi. By winning over such a prominent dissenter, Bunim succeeded in setting a trend for all branches, and Rabbi Solomon Sharfman became the first rabbi.

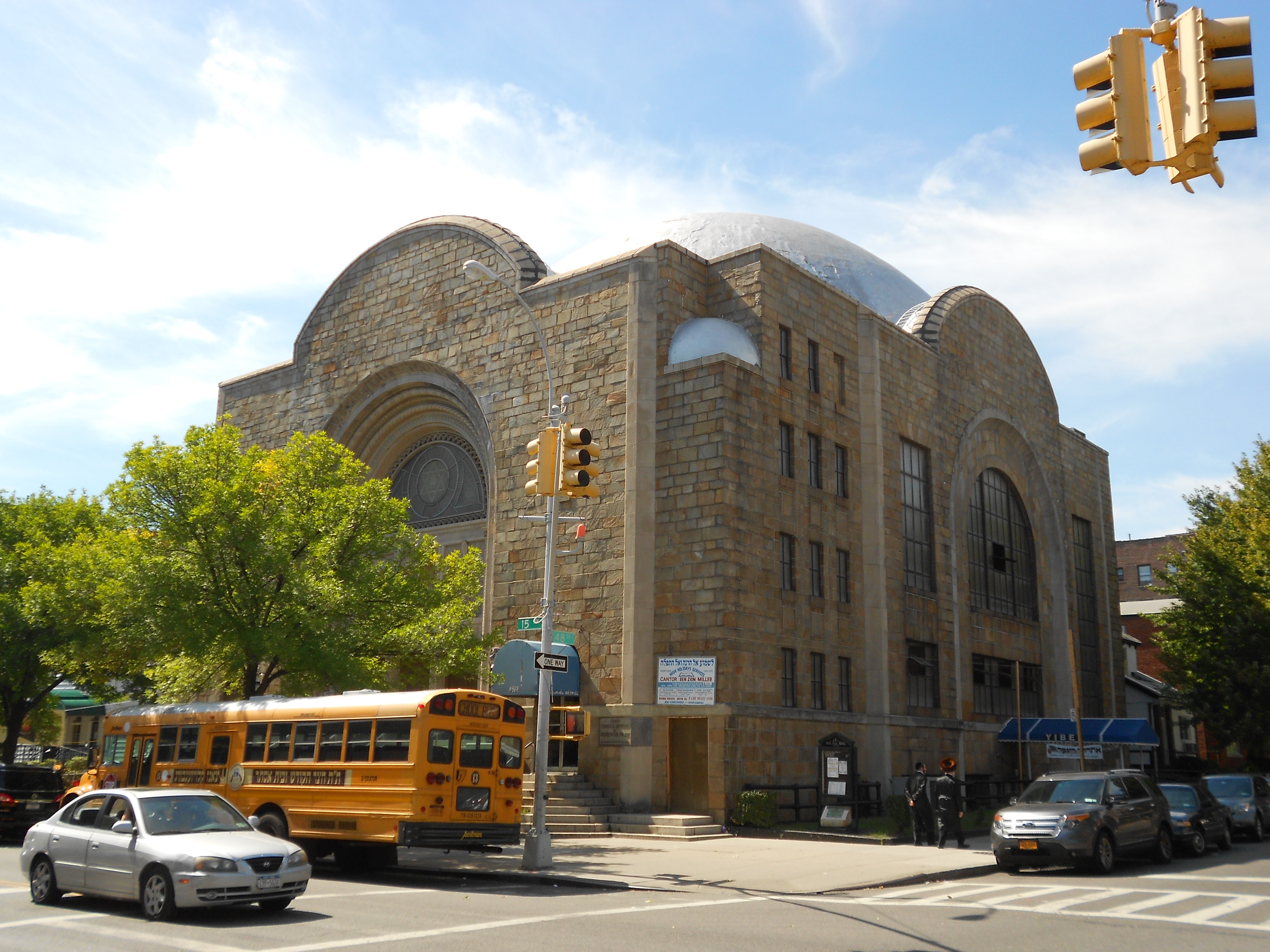
Young Israel Beth-El of Boro Park

=== Young Israel Beth-El of Boro Park ===
Established well before World War II as Young Israel of Boro Park, during the 1980s Young Israel merged with the Congregation Beth El of Borough Park, founded in 1902, to form Young Israel Beth El of Borough Park. The merged congregation worships from the National Register of Historic Places–listed synagogue on 15th Avenue in Brooklyn.

=== Largest ===
Young Israel of Woodmere is by far the branch with the largest congregation. There are approximately 1,250 families as of 2018.

The second largest branch is that of Young Israel of Deerfield Beach in Century Village, with about 1000 members. During the winter months, "with almost 120 men attending, the Daf Yomi class is America's largest."

== See also ==
- Jewish fundamentalism

== Bibliography ==
- Kraut, Benny "A Modern Heretic and a Traditional Community: Mordecai M. Kaplan, Orthodoxy, and American Judaism" American Jewish History - Volume 86, Number 3, September 1998, pp. 357–363
- Kornreich Yaakov; Saibel, Joel; Hart Strober, Deborah; Strober, Gerald " (2012). Young Israel at 100: An American Response to the Challenges of Orthodox Living 1912–2012. NCYI. ISBN 978-1475157925.
