= Kemp Mill, Maryland =

- Census-designated place
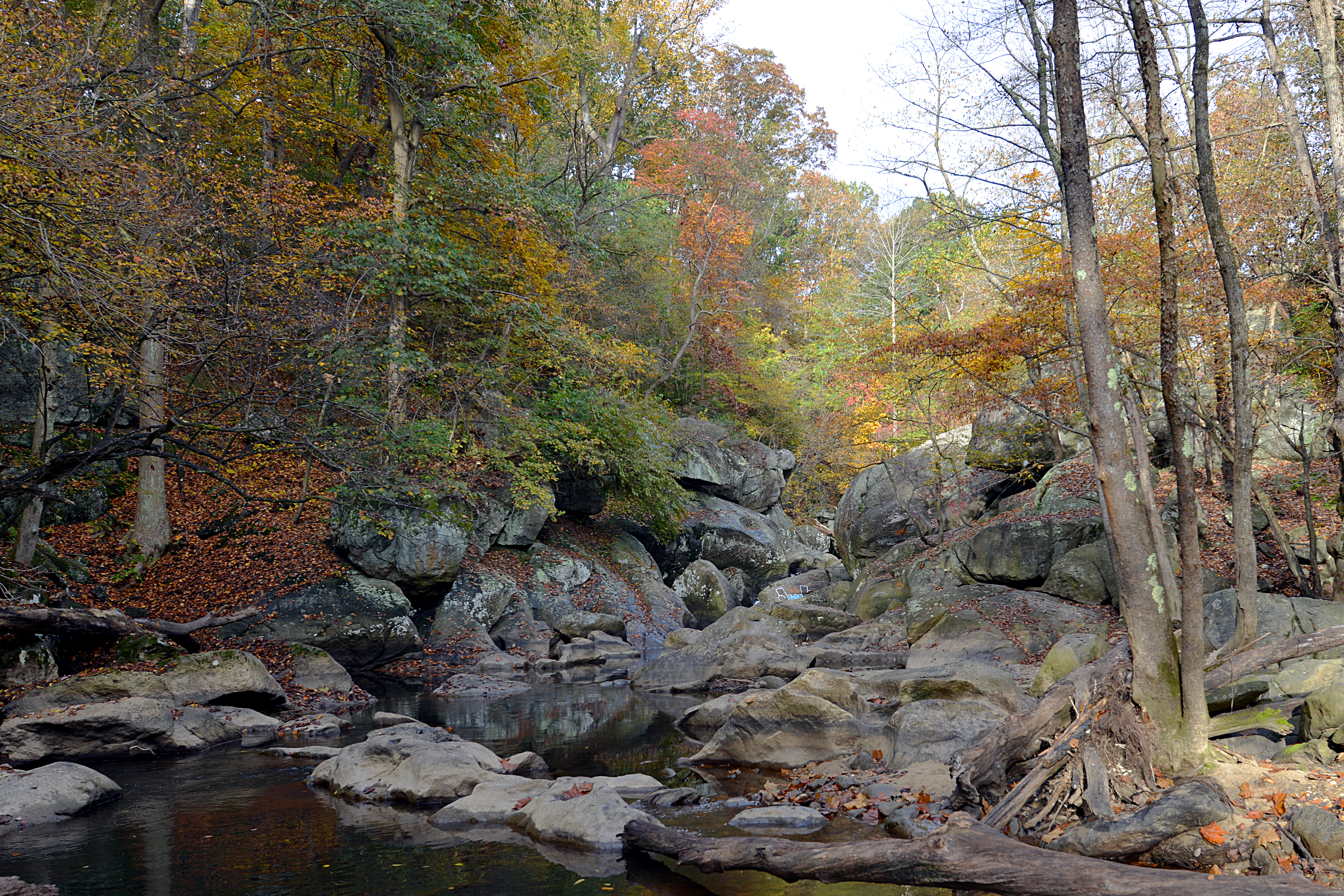
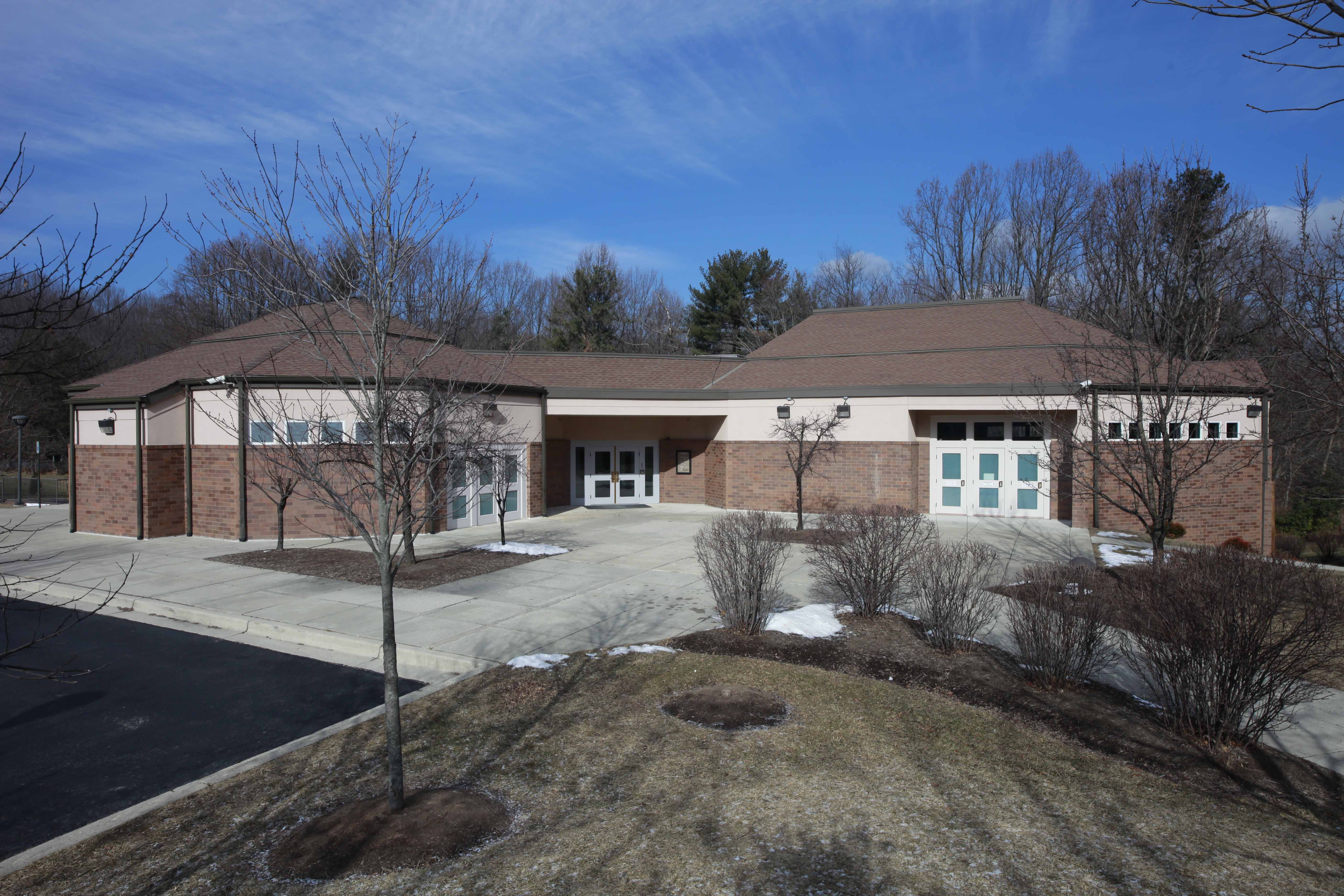
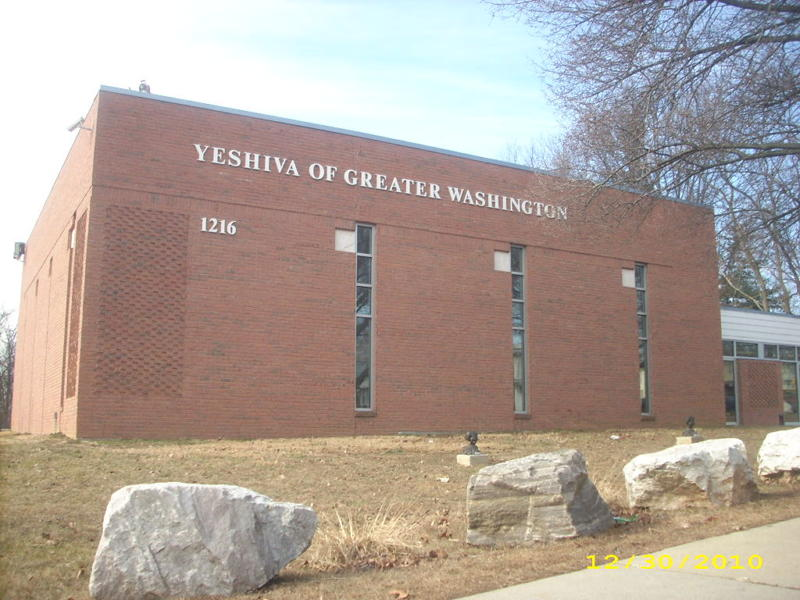
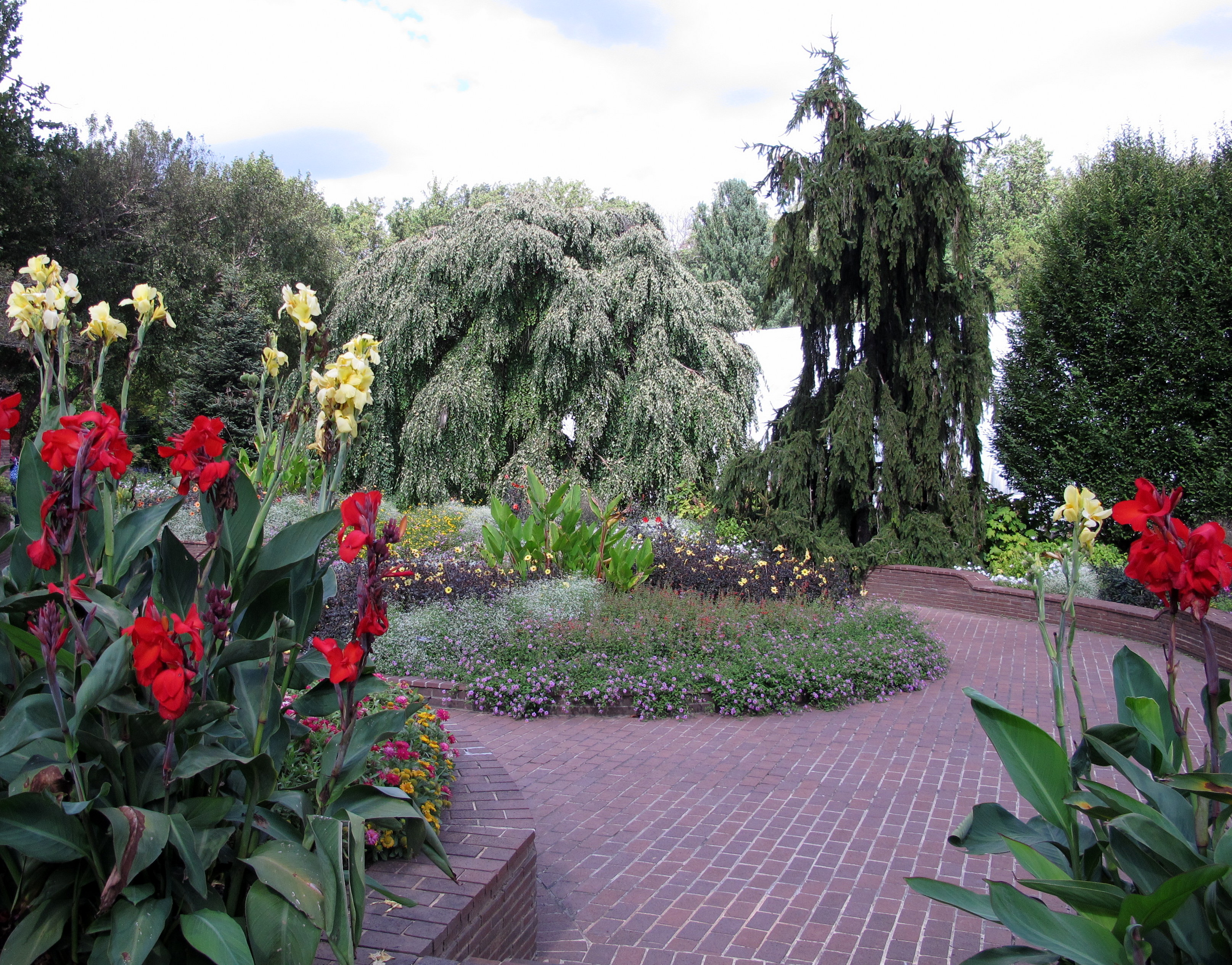
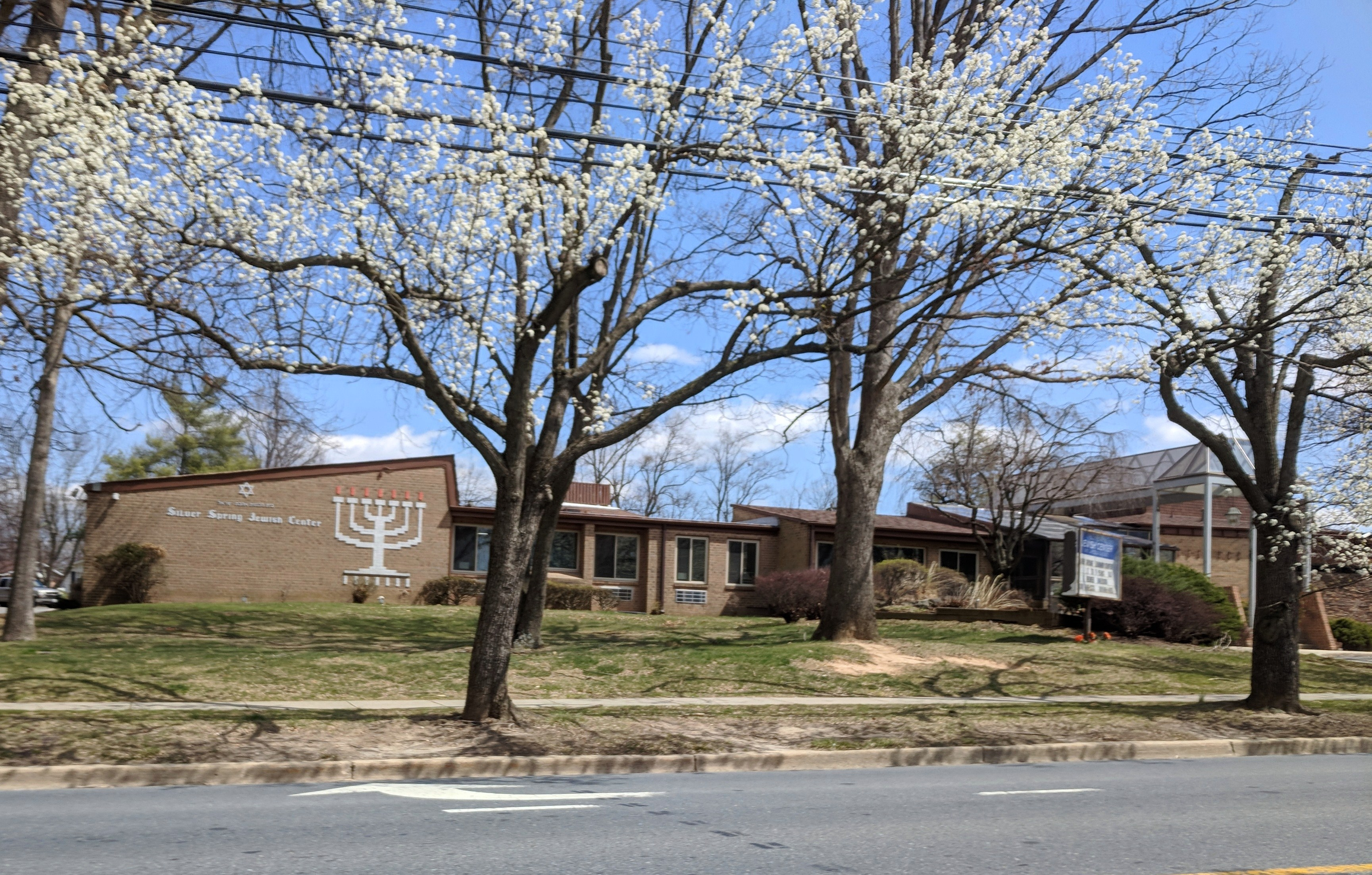
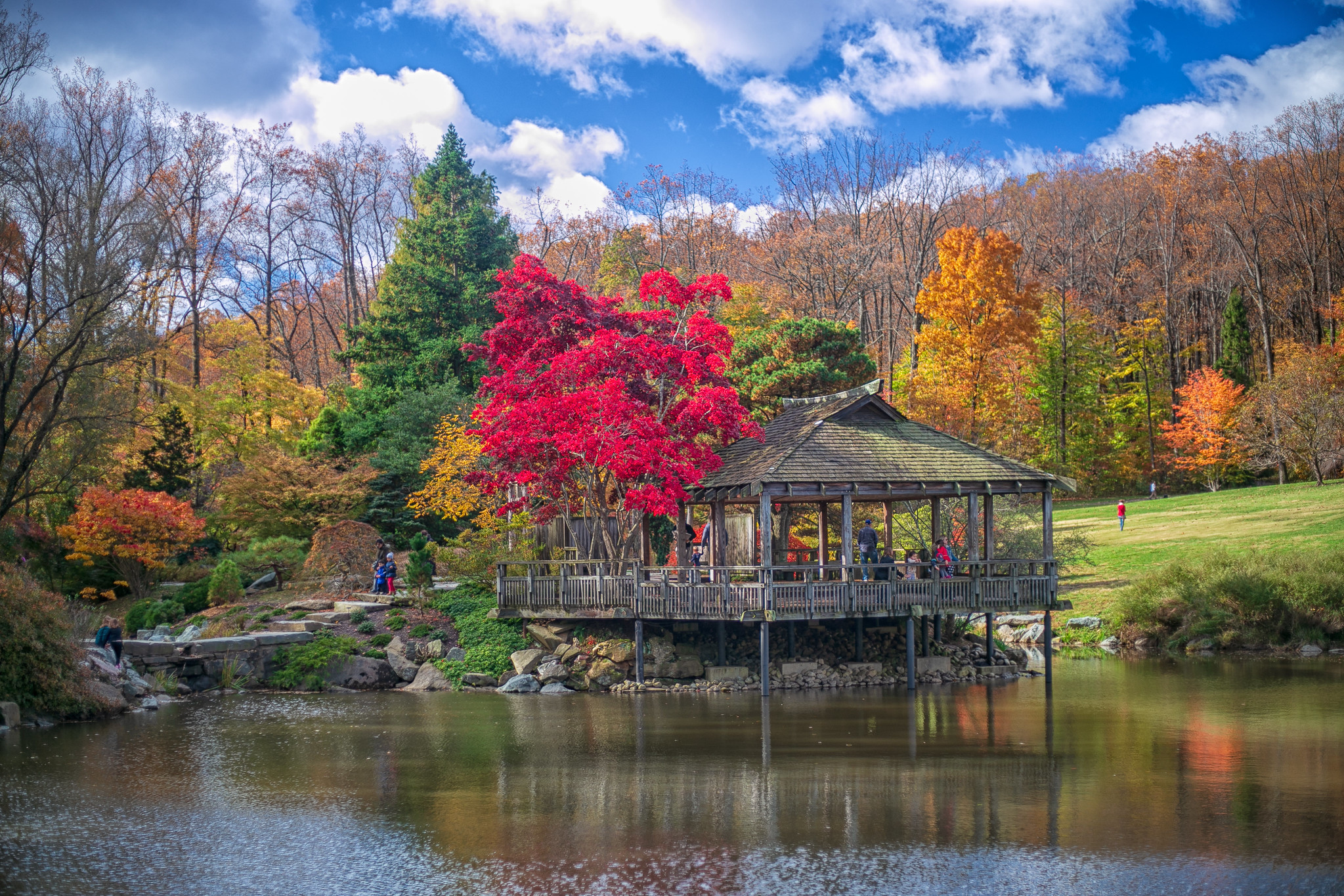
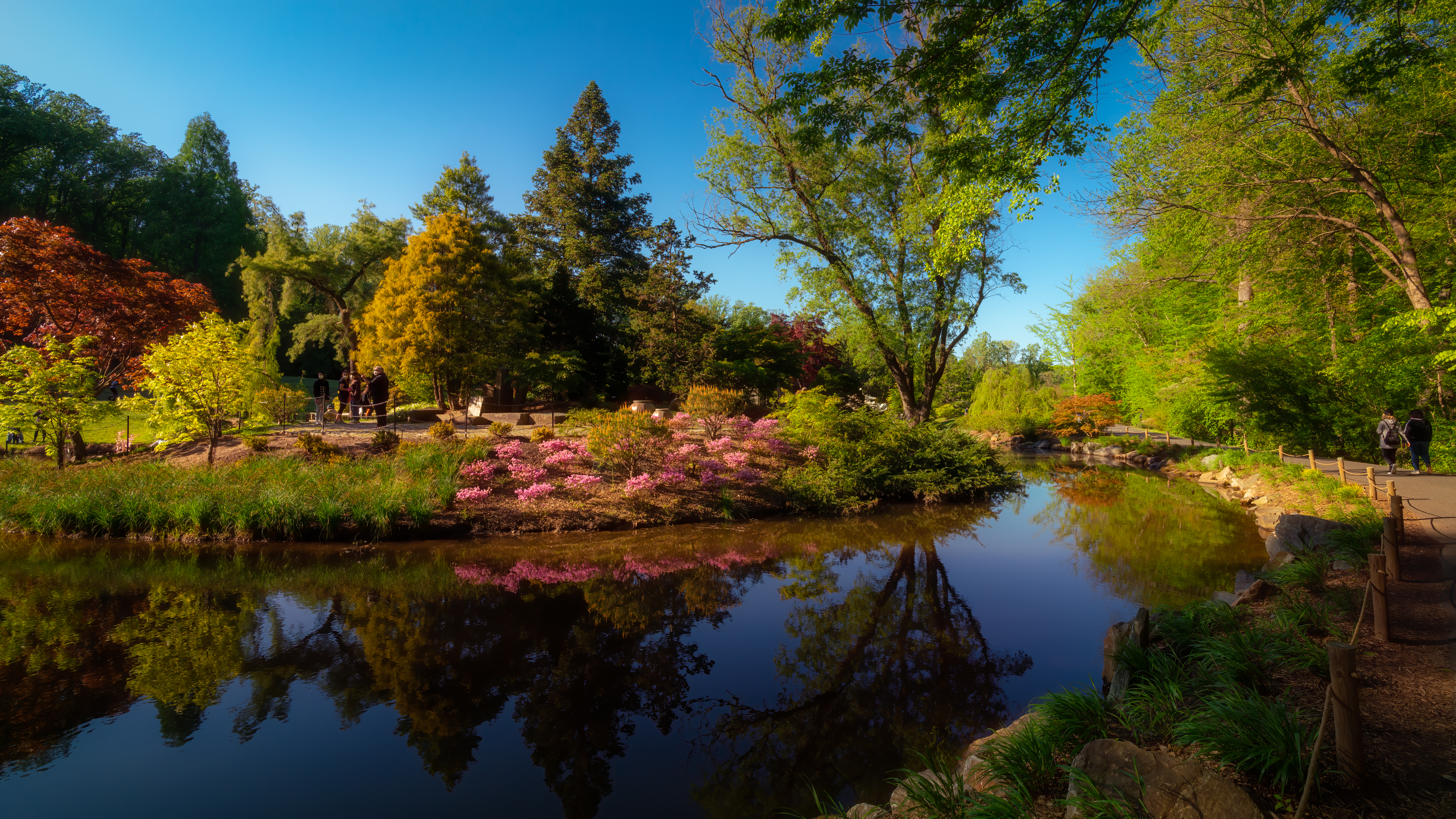
- Northwest Branch fall line Kemp Mill Synagogue Yeshiva of Greater Washington Brookside Gardens Silver Spring Jewish Center Brookside Gardens teahouse Brookside Gardens

- Location of Kemp Mill, Maryland
- Coordinates: 39°02′29″N 77°01′17″W
- Country: United States
- State: Maryland
- County: Montgomery
- Settled: 1745

Government
  - Type: Unincorporated
  - County Council: Montgomery County Council

Area
  - Total: 2.54 sq mi (6.57 km^{2})
  - Land: 2.51 sq mi (6.50 km^{2})
  - Water: 0.027 sq mi (0.07 km^{2})
- Elevation: 351 ft (107 m)

Population (2020)
  - Total: 13,378
  - Density: 5,331.1/sq mi (2,058.36/km^{2})

Racial composition (2020)
  - White: 59.5%
  - Black or African American: 18.1%
  - Asian: 8.3%
  - Native American: 1.3%
  - Hispanic or Latino (of any race): 13.5%
- Time zone: UTC−5 (Eastern (EST))
  - Summer (DST): UTC−4 (EDT)
- ZIP Code: 20902, 20901
- Area codes: 301, 240
- FIPS code: 24-43200
- GNIS feature ID: 2389992

Kemp Mill is a census-designated place and an unincorporated census area in Montgomery County, Maryland, United States. It is known for its creekside walkways, calm suburban atmosphere, Brookside Gardens, and numerous hiking trails. Home to the largest Orthodox Jewish community on the East Coast between Baltimore and Miami, it hosts more than half a dozen synagogues within its boundaries. The population was 13,378 at the 2020 census.

Kemp Mill census area consists of multiple subdivisions, including Kemp Mill Estates, Kemp Mill Farms, Kemp Mill Forest, and Springbrook Forest. The community also includes University Towers, with 523 condominium units, and the Warwick, with 393 rental units. The neighborhood has over 1,693 houses.

== History ==
=== Early history ===
Prior to the arrival of European settlers, the area that is now Kemp Mill was inhabited by Indigenous peoples, including the Piscataway and the Nacotchtank. Captain John Smith of the English settlement at Jamestown was probably the first European to explore the area, during his travels along the Potomac River and throughout the Chesapeake region.

Evan Thomas, a Quaker minister and political activist, settled the land and established a frame saw and grist mill in 1745, which he named Thomas’ Mill. The mill was sold to Aaron Dyer in 1816, who sold it to Francis Valdenar in 1833. In the 1830s, a small settlement called Claysville sprang up around the mill. The settlement was renamed Kemp Mill in 1857 when George Kemp purchased the mill from Valdenar, and the Kemp family managed the mill until 1905. The mill eventually burned down in 1919, marking the end of 174 years of continuous operation.

=== 19th century ===
In the 19th century, much of eastern Montgomery County was dominated by agriculture. The area's rolling terrain was ideal for both small and large farms, while the surrounding woodlands provided essential lumber for homes. Early settlers also established mills along the Northwest Branch Anacostia River and Paint Branch, utilizing the streambed gradient to harness hydropower.

In July 1864, during the Civil War, Silver Spring, Maryland (including Kemp Mill) experienced a significant incursion by Confederate forces. As General Jubal Early's troops spread across the fields and orchards, reactions among the residents varied, with some cheering, and others fleeing to the capital. The Confederate soldiers ransacked properties, including the estate of Montgomery Blair, Lincoln's postmaster general, which they set ablaze. Additionally, Early used the home of Blair's father as his headquarters to coordinate an assault on Washington's defenses.

=== 20th century ===
The first subdivisions in the greater Kemp Mill area broke ground in 1931. During this era, the nearby Washington suburb of Silver Spring has been described as a sundown town. Prior to World War II, racial covenants were used in Washington, D.C. and Silver Spring to exclude African Americans, Jews, and others. In 1948, the Supreme Court's Shelley v Kraemer decision rendered racial covenants legally unenforceable, but African Americans, Jews, and others in the Washington metropolitan area continued to be excluded under the covenants until the passage of the Fair Housing Act of 1968.

In the early 1930s, property owners in the Kemp Mill area began establishing very large lot subdivisions (five-acre lots) in various areas just outside the initial suburban ring. These developments were intended to be exclusive neighborhoods with a park-like ambiance. Gray's Estates in Kemp Mill was one such example. Yeatman Parkway, following a tributary to the Northwest Branch, was dedicated as part of Gray's Estates. Today, the parkway is the only remnant of this type of development in Kemp Mill.

A few years after World War II, developers plotted subdivisions with one to five-acre lots near the stream valley parks, anticipating future access to planned sewer systems, as noted on the record plats. Springbrook Forest in Kemp Mill, adjacent to the future Northwest Branch Park, dates back to this phase of suburban expansion.

Kemp Mill Farms and Kemp Mill Estates were first developed in the late 1950s, approximately a decade after the 1948 Supreme Court Shelley v Kraemer decision. The neighborhood was among several communities in Montgomery County's Silver Spring area that were built by Jewish real estate developers catering to Jews moving to the suburbs from Washington, D.C. The majority of residences in Kemp Mill are single family homes dating to the 1950s, although newer homes were built in the 1980s and 1990s on Yeatman, Bromley, and Kersey roads.

Kemp Mill Estates was developed by Jack Kay and Harold Greenberg of the Kay Construction Company, the son and son-in-law of real estate developer Abraham S. Kay. According to the historian David Rotenstein, some Jewish developers in Silver Spring, including the Kays, used anti-Black covenants prior to the Fair Housing Act of 1968. As he said, "to be sure, Jews were barred from many places, too, but our shared Judaism doesn’t immunize us from racism." However, Rotenstein acknowledged that some Jewish developers also built integrated housing. For example, Morris Milgram began purchasing existing apartments in Silver Spring and integrating them during the early and mid-1960s, and Jewish organizations such as Jews for Urban Justice formed to protest alongside civil rights groups, advocating for equal access to housing.

Orthodox Jews began moving to Kemp Mill in 1961, when the Young Israel Shomrai Emunah synagogue relocated from Washington, D.C. Rav Gedaliah Anemer, the spiritual leader of the congregation, recognized early on that the changing demographics in Washington would eventually necessitate a new center of Jewish life. Despite the area being primarily farmland with limited infrastructure, Rav Anemer envisioned a vibrant Torah community in Kemp Mill. He began hosting minyanim in his basement before the first synagogue was completed on University Boulevard.

Under Rabbi Anemer, a robust Jewish education was established in the area. At a time when the only Jewish school was the coeducational Hebrew Academy through ninth grade, and high school options were either public school or long commutes to Baltimore or New York, he founded the Yeshiva of Greater Washington. The girls’ high school opened in 1964 with just six students, and a boys’ yeshivah followed soon after. Both institutions moved between makeshift facilities in their early years, but community support ensured their growth. Today, they serve hundreds of students and are cornerstone institutions of the Kemp Mill Orthodox community.

To support their religious practices, Orthodox Jews in Kemp Mill developed tight-knit communities and constructed eruvim, ritual boundaries that allow for the carrying of objects on Shabbat. These eruvim were creatively made using utility poles, freeway barriers, fences, and strings. An eruv inspector, often seen in tzitzit, kippah, and an orange vest, checks the eruv on Thursdays or Fridays to ensure it is kosher. According to historian David Rotenstein, "there are signs of Jewish adaptations to the landscape everywhere if you know where to look".

As the Jewish population in Kemp Mill grew, so did the need for kosher food establishments. Anemer led the Vaad HaKashrus of Washington, implementing strict supervision protocols that are still respected today. By 1989, 25% of the 2,000 families in Kemp Mill were Orthodox Jews, and by 2005, half of the community's 10,000 residents identified as such.

Alongside this demographic growth, new synagogues were established to serve the expanding Orthodox population. On March 17, 1990, Kemp Mill Synagogue held its first service on Parashat Parah, in a house purchased as a temporary facility for the new congregation. In 1994, Rabbi Jack Bieler became the first rabbi of KMS. The congregation moved into its current building on Kemp Mill Road in September 1998.

=== 21st century ===
In 2005, Chabad of Silver Spring was founded by Rabbi Berel and Chaya Wolvovsky on Lamberton Drive. Today it also operates The Gan Montessori preschool and Camp Gan Israel of Silver Spring.

In 2011, Kehillas Ohr HaTorah was established by a group of former students of the Yeshiva of Greater Washington. The first Shabbos morning minyan was held in November 2012, in the University Towers on Arcola Avenue. Rabbi Michoel Frank was appointed Rav and Mara D’Asra in August 2014. After outgrowing its original location, the shul moved to the Kemp Mill Shopping Center in 2016 and later purchased land from the Silver Spring Jewish Center to build a permanent facility. Ohr HaTorah dedicated the building on May 12, 2017.

During the summer of 2020, multiple Black Lives Matter rallies were held at Northwood High School in Kemp Mill as part of the nationwide protests against racism and police brutality. A 2020 statement of solidarity with African Americans issued by the Jewish Community Relations Council of Greater Washington was signed by Kemp Mill Synagogue.

=== Hate crimes ===
In 1977, the Yeshiva of Greater Washington, then located on the corner of Kemp Mill Road and Yeatman Parkway, was vandalized with swastikas, antisemitic slogans, and obscenities. It was later damaged by arson, prompting the yeshiva to relocate to its current campus on Arcola Avenue.

In 1978, a Black D.C. school official living in Kemp Mill was the target of a hate crime when the N-word and "KKK" were painted on her house and her tires were slashed. Similar incidents, including several cross-burnings attributed to members of the Ku Klux Klan, occurred in towns surrounding Kemp Mill during these years, primarily Prince George's County.

In March 1989, a young Asian man was beaten in nearby Sligo Creek Park by a group of youths and young adults shouting anti-Asian racial slurs. Ten individuals were arrested in connection with the crime. A few months later, there was a spate of antisemitic incidents rumored to be due to skinheads. Swastikas were painted on several vehicles, 40 cars had their windows shot in with BB guns, the graffiti "All Jews Must Die Now" was painted on a sidewalk, and an Orthodox Jewish school was vandalized. A suspect was tried for vandalizing the Orthodox Jewish school after he confessed to the crime to ten people over several months, according to trial testimony. However, police found no physical evidence linking the suspect to the crime, and nobody was convicted. At the time, authorities described the incident at the school as "extraordinarily destructive." A community meeting was held, and local police claimed that "youths" were to blame for the antisemitic incidents and that there were no organized neo-Nazis or skinheads in the region. However, a man living in Kemp Mill had recently been convicted for antisemitic vandalism of Kemp Mill Urban Park, an act the police claimed was inspired by the 1988 film Betrayed, which follows the actions of a white supremacist organization.

During the early 2020s, a series of antisemitic incidents were reported at Jewish institutions and businesses in Kemp Mill amid a broader increase in reported antisemitism across Montgomery County.

In June 2022, shortly before the Shavuot holiday, antisemitic fliers advertising neo-Nazi websites were placed at several locations in Kemp Mill, including at a bus shelter located in front of the Young Israel Shomrai Emunah synagogue and on an ice chest outside of the Shalom Kosher grocery store. The fliers used antisemitic slurs, denied the Holocaust, and called for genocide against the Jewish people. That same month, a group of Jewish men walking to a synagogue in Kemp Mill were targeted by someone throwing eggs at them, an incident subsequently identified by the ADL as one of three antisemitic assaults reported statewide that year.

In February 2023, Northwood High School's outdoor facilities were closed to the public due to repeated targeting by an unknown hate group with antisemitic fliers. The fliers were found on the school's athletic fields four times, prompting Principal Jonathan Garrick to announce the closure of the facilities, including the athletic fields, track, tennis courts, and other outdoor areas. Although the perpetrators were not apprehended, the Goyim Defense League (GDL) had recently been caught vandalizing Jewish properties in nearby Kensington, Maryland.

Following the October 7 attacks in Israel in 2023, and amid concerns about rising antisemitic vandalism, county police announced on October 9 that they were stepping up patrols around synagogues and Jewish schools.

On the morning of June 17, 2024, a rabbi walking along Arcola Avenue near Kemp Mill Road was attacked by a man wielding a wooden stake, sustaining minor injuries. Montgomery County police arrested a 47-year-old man, Junior Michael Reece, nearby and charged him with felony and misdemeanor assault, as well as a hate crime enhancement. According to police, the charge was based on Reece's statements after the arrest, the location of the attack, and the victim's visibly Jewish attire.

On September 3, 2026, a DoorDash delivery driver allegedly made antisemitic threats toward students from the Yeshiva of Greater Washington at Ben Yehuda Pizza, a kosher restaurant in Kemp Mill Shopping Center. According to employees interviewed by Washington Jewish Week, the driver entered the restaurant during the yeshiva's lunch rush, when numerous middle- and high-school students were present, and began making antisemitic remarks while shadowboxing and gesturing as though wielding a sword. Employees reported that he threatened to assault the students and return to behead people at the restaurant.

== Culture ==
The Kemp Mill area, with its small size and the frequent use of local amenities by residents, has developed into a pedestrian-friendly community. Many people walk to nearby shops, schools, religious institutions, and recreational spots. Each sub-neighborhood within Kemp Mill has its unique character, shaped by similar housing styles and separated by local streets. Most of the residential streets of Kemp Mill consist of winding roads ending in cul-de-sacs. The area features a mix of midcentury split-level homes, 1980s colonials, and ramblers, all set behind sidewalks and grassy front lawns, shaded by oak trees. In 2024, home prices in the neighborhood ranged from $480,000 to $1.3 million.

To the north are Kemp Mill Forest and Springbrook Forest. Kemp Mill Forest, developed in the 1980s using a cluster design, includes both single-family homes and townhouses. Springbrook Forest, one of the oldest neighborhoods, features large lots, narrow streets, and numerous mature trees. The central Kemp Mill neighborhood dates back to the 1950s and 1960s, characterized by traditional suburban development with lots ranging from 6,000 to 9,000 square feet, featuring brick houses.

Kemp Mill is home to the largest Orthodox Jewish community on the East Coast between Baltimore and Miami. It hosts a number of synagogues serving Orthodox Jews (Modern Orthodox, Hasidic, and Yeshivish) including Young Israel Shomrai Emunah, the Yeshiva of Greater Washington (Tiferes Gedaliah), Chabad of Silver Spring, Kemp Mill Synagogue, Silver Spring Jewish Center, Kehillas Ohr Hatorah and Minchas Yitzhak. Additionally, there are many smaller Orthodox Jewish minyanim (prayer groups) throughout the neighborhood including a Sephardic Minyan that meets at Shomrai Emunah and the Lower Lamberton Minyan.

In a 2023 article for Tablet, journalist Armin Rosen described Kemp Mill Synagogue as a spiritual home for lobbyists, policy scholars, and White House staffers. He noted that the synagogue had once been nicknamed "Congregation Bnei Ivy" because of congregants' ties to Ivy League universities, although congregant and historian Tevi Troy suggested that the nickname was no longer as fitting.

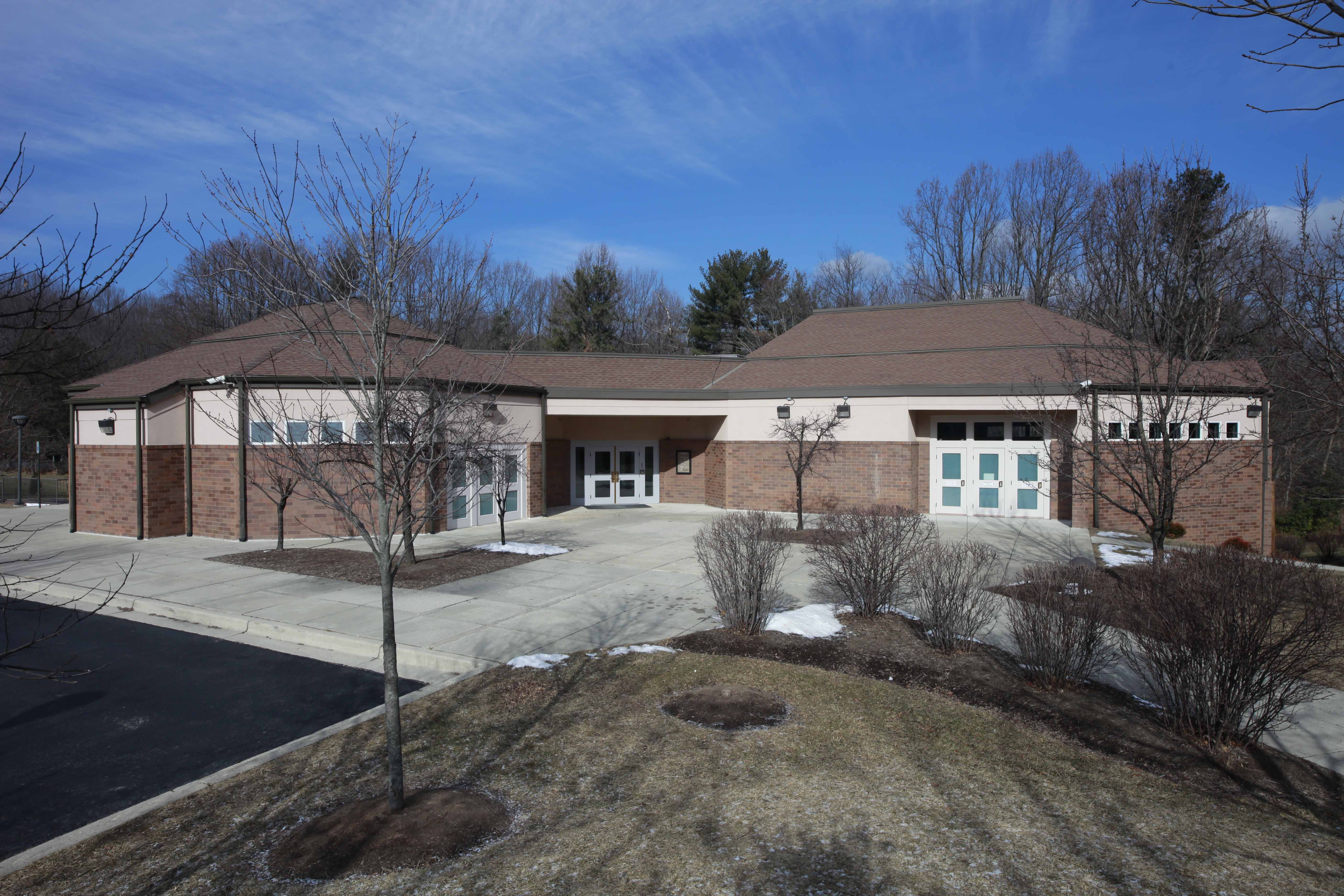
Kemp Mill Synagogue

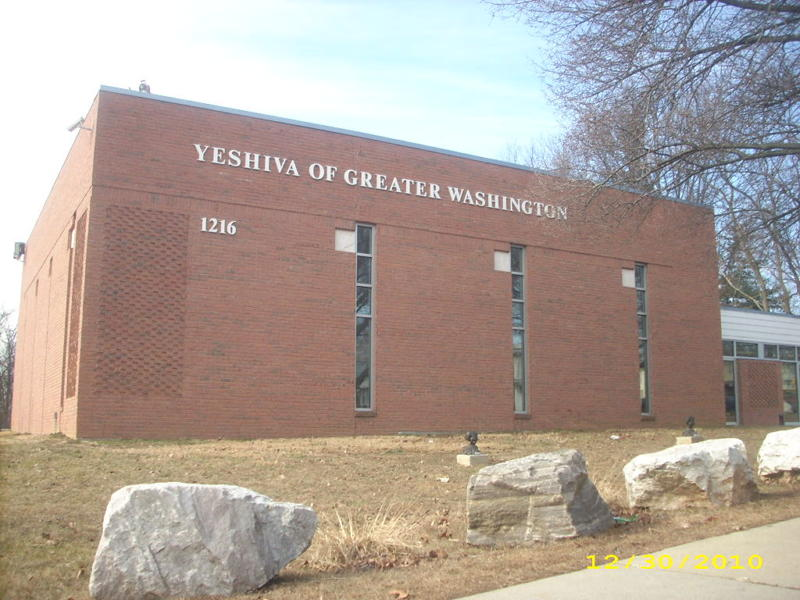
The Yeshiva of Greater Washington

There are also a number families in the area who are served by a Conservative synagogue, Har Tzeon Agudath Achim.

Several Jewish parochial schools are located in Kemp Mill including the Silver Spring Learning Center, the Jewish Montessori School, and the boys division of the Yeshiva of Greater Washington. The yeshiva also hosts a kollel (Zichron Amram) and a yeshiva gedolah, which offers a bachelor's degree in Talmudic Law through its fully accredited college program, Yeshiva College of the Nation's Capital.

Three public schools are also situated in the area, including Northwood High School, Odessa Shannon Middle School (Renamed from Colonel E. Brooke Lee Middle School in July 2021), and Kemp Mill Elementary School. The former Spring Mill Elementary school is now the Yeshiva Middle School and an administrative office.

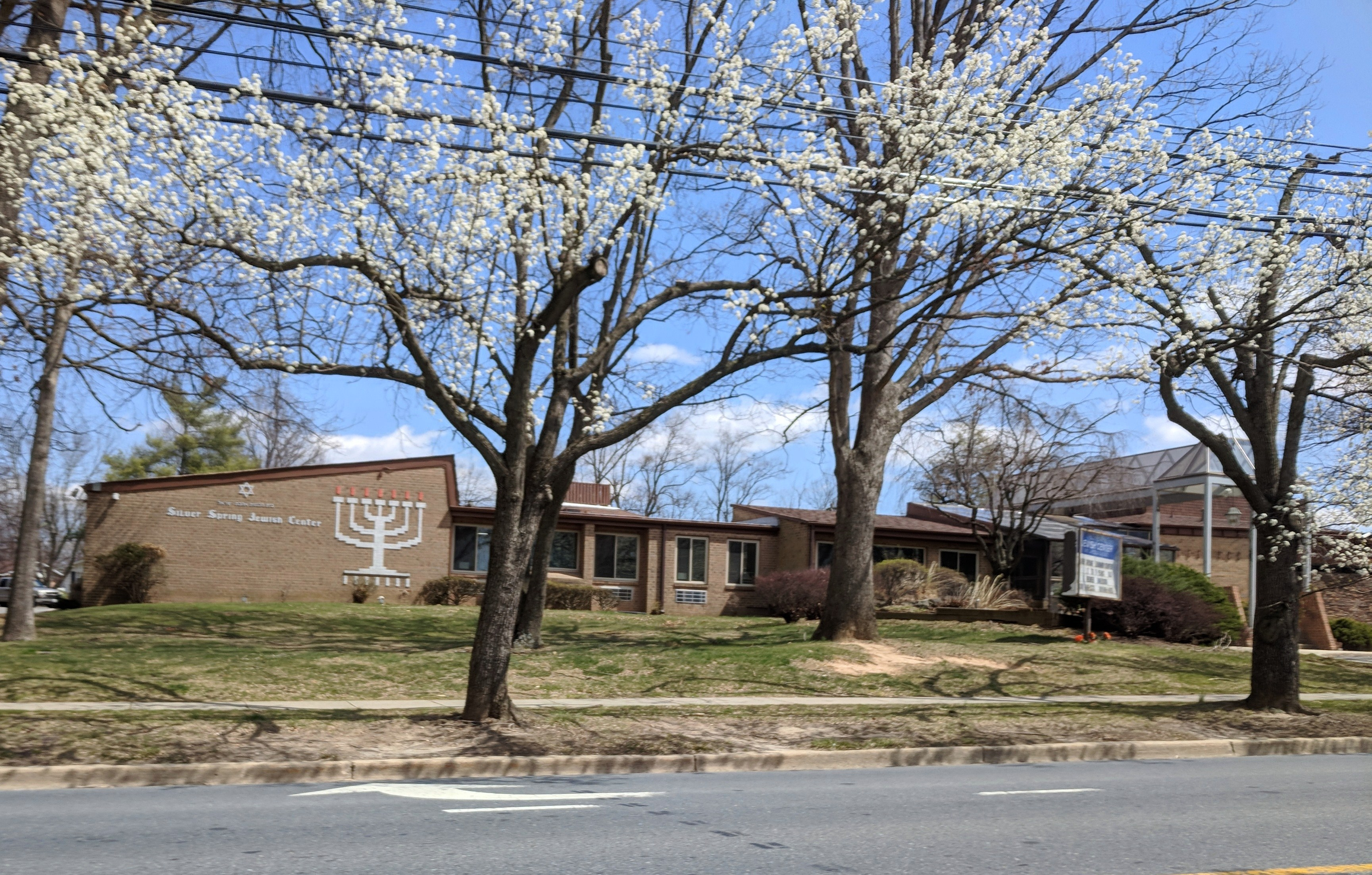
Silver Spring Learning Center

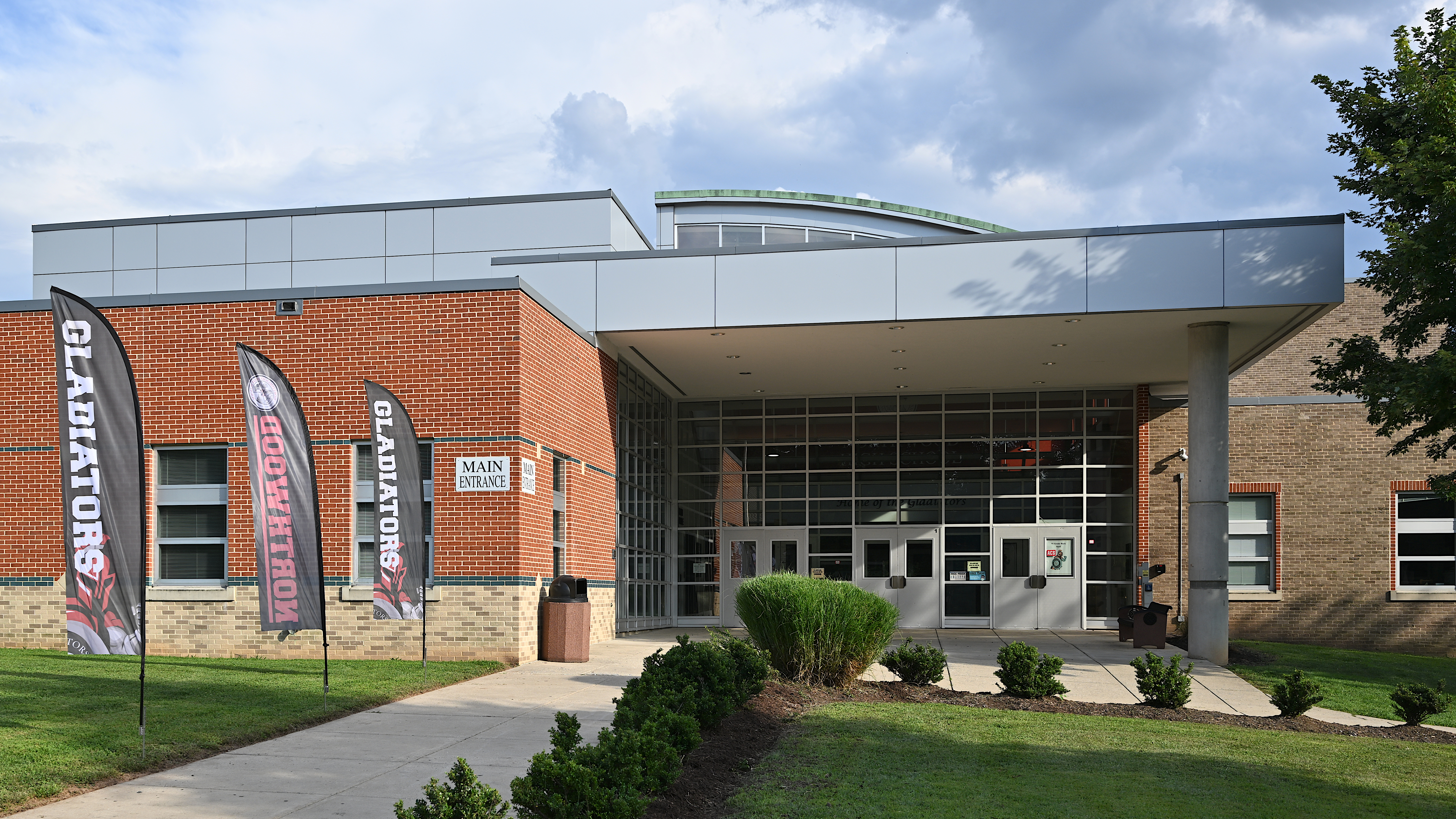
Entrance to Northwood High School

Kemp Mill Shopping Center, along with the public amenities of Kemp Mill Urban Park, collectively function as the community's town center. Sidewalks from the neighboring residential developments lead to the shopping center, and a paved trail from Sligo Creek Park also terminates at this central location. The shopping center is the commerce hub of the neighborhood. It was long anchored by Giant Food, which operated there until September 2007.

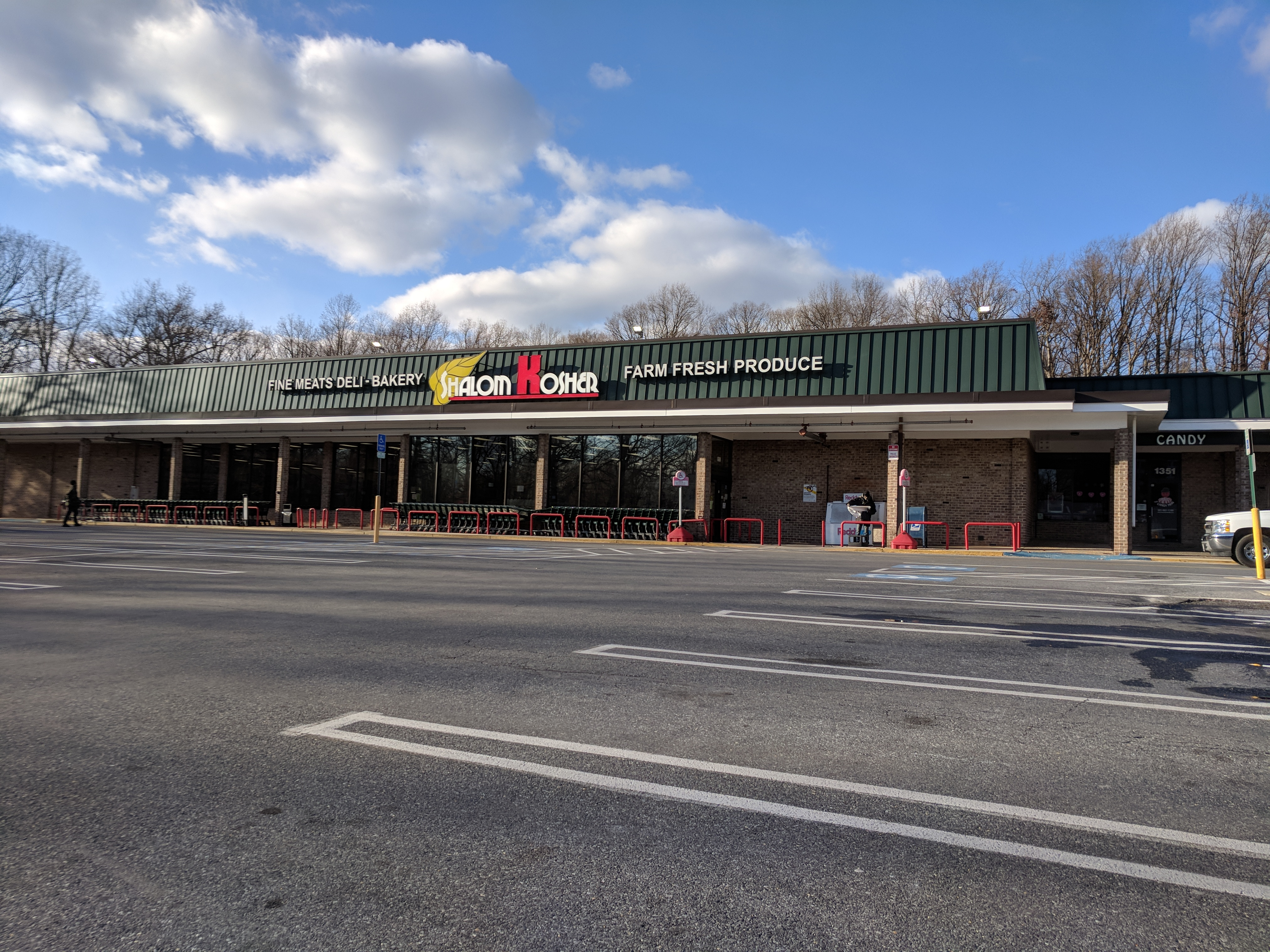
Shalom Kosher, a grocery store in Kemp Mill

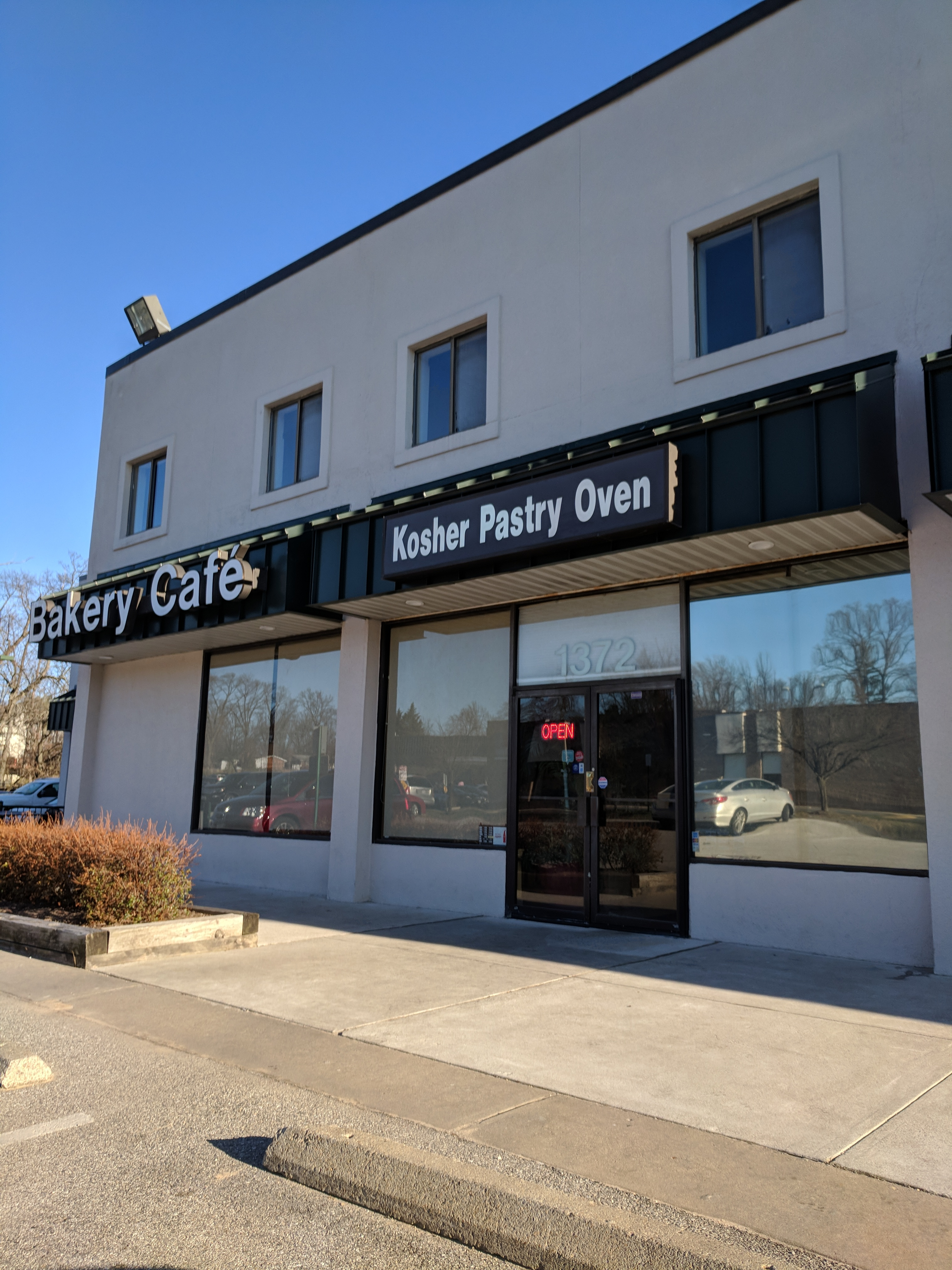
The Kosher Pastry Oven in Kemp Mill Shopping Center

A Kemp Mill Village is being formed to serve the needs of elderly and disabled residents.

=== Crime ===
Kemp Mill has a crime rate of 12.24 incidents per 1,000 residents annually, making it safer than 90% of U.S. cities. Violent crime is low, with a rate of 1.56 per 1,000 residents, while property crime, albeit rare, is slightly more common, at 6.91 per 1,000 residents. The northeast part of Kemp Mill is generally considered the safest, while the southwest has slightly higher crime rates.

In comparison to nearby areas, Kemp Mill has a lower crime rate than the majority of neighborhoods, including Four Corners, White Oak, Woodside and Wheaton. This means residents of Kemp Mill experience fewer incidents of both violent and property crimes relative to many surrounding communities.

== Recreation ==
Kemp Mill Estates Local Park, a 12-acre (4.9 ha) county park bordering the Northwest Branch Stream Valley Park, offers a playground, a softball field, a multi-use field, a basketball court, two lighted tennis courts (one striped for pickleball), and a rentable activity building.

Kemp Mill Urban Park sits on about 2.7 acres (1.1 ha) at the intersection of Arcola Avenue and Lamberton Drive, near the Kemp Mill Shopping Center, Yeshiva of Greater Washington, and Young Israel Shomrai Emunah. It includes a central water feature, an accessible playground, and a combination basketball and soccer court. Originally developed in the 1960s, the park was closed in February 2016 for a full renovation and reopened in 2017.

Sligo Creek rises in the Kemp Mill area and flows south to its confluence with the Northwest Branch Anacostia River. The Sligo Creek Trail, a paved hiker-biker trail roughly 10.2 miles (16.4 km) long in Montgomery County, runs alongside the creek and connects to the Anacostia Tributary Trail System. The eastern edge of the community is bounded by the Northwest Branch, which is followed by the Northwest Branch Trail.

The adjacent Wheaton Regional Park offers additional recreation, including horseback riding and the Wheaton Ice Arena, one of two indoor ice rinks operated by Montgomery Parks. The Wheaton Library and Recreation Center, operated by Montgomery County Public Libraries, stands at the corner of Arcola Avenue and Georgia Avenue.

Two private community pools, Parkland Pool and the Kemp Mill Swim Club, serve the community.

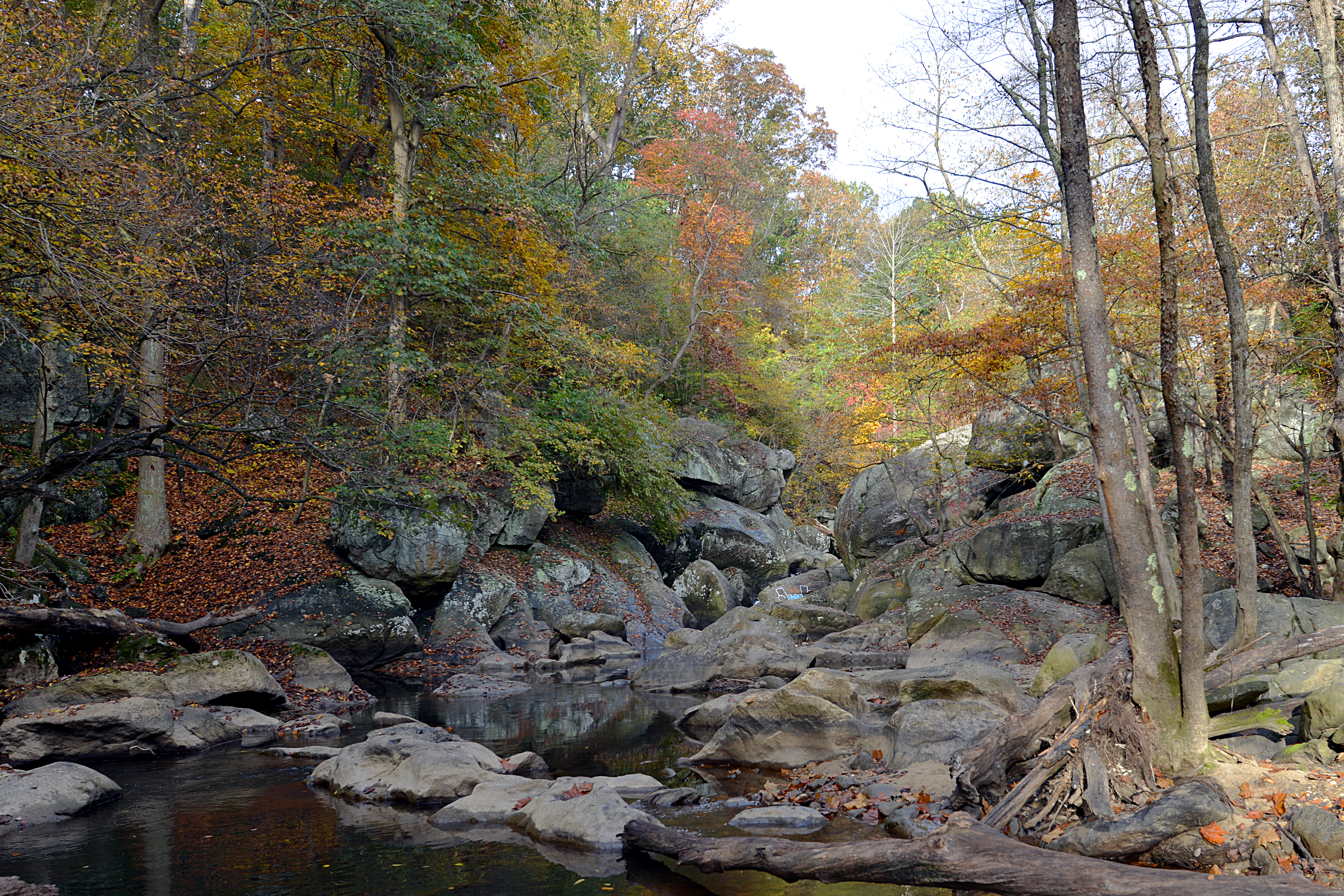
Northwest Branch fall line

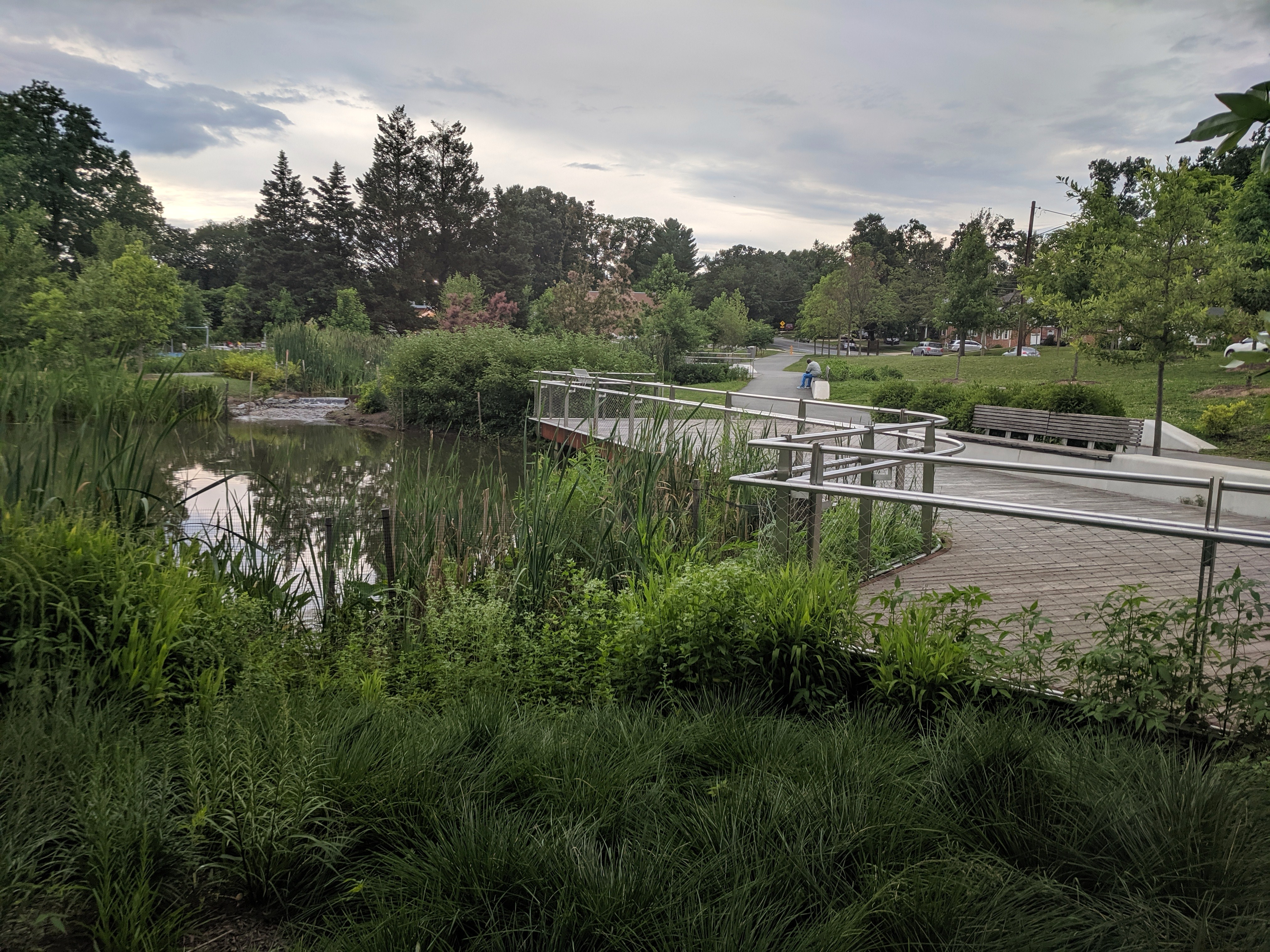
Kemp Mill Urban Park

== Geography ==
Kemp Mill in the Washington Metropolitan Area

Large parks border Kemp Mill on both the east and west sides. A defining feature of Kemp Mill is its abundant open space and greenery. Extensive stretches along both sides of Kemp Mill Road are filled with lush greenery. Northwest Branch Anacostia River lies to the east, while Wheaton Regional Park is to the west. The Kemp Mill area contains around 6,000 acres of forest, most of which is situated within parkland.

As an unincorporated area, Kemp Mill does not have officially defined boundaries. However, Kemp Mill is recognized by the United States Census Bureau and by the United States Geological Survey as a census-designated place.

According to the U.S. Census Bureau, the neighborhood has a total area of 2.54 square miles (6.2 km^{2}), nearly all land.

Kemp Mill is considered by many of its residents to be part of unincorporated Silver Spring. It is served by the Wheaton Post Office.

There is a very large eruv that encompasses Kemp Mill and the other Jewish communities of Silver Spring.

== Climate ==
Kemp Mill experiences a humid subtropical climate, characterized by hot, humid summers and mild winters. Summer temperatures typically reach the mid-80s Fahrenheit, while winter temperatures seldom drop below freezing. The area receives an average of 44 inches of rain annually, surpassing the U.S. average of 38 inches per year. Precipitation is distributed relatively evenly throughout the year, with slightly drier conditions during the summer months.

Snowfall in Kemp Mill averages 14 inches per year, which is lower than the national average of 28 inches. Precipitation of some form occurs approximately 110 days per year.

July is the hottest month in Kemp Mill, with an average high temperature of 87.5 °F, making it warmer than most locations in Maryland. The area enjoys three particularly comfortable months—September, May, and June—where high temperatures range between 70 and 85 °F.

The summer months in Kemp Mill can bring uncomfortable levels of humidity, with July being the most humid. However, humidity levels remain low for much of the year, with July, August, and June being the most humid months.

== Transportation ==
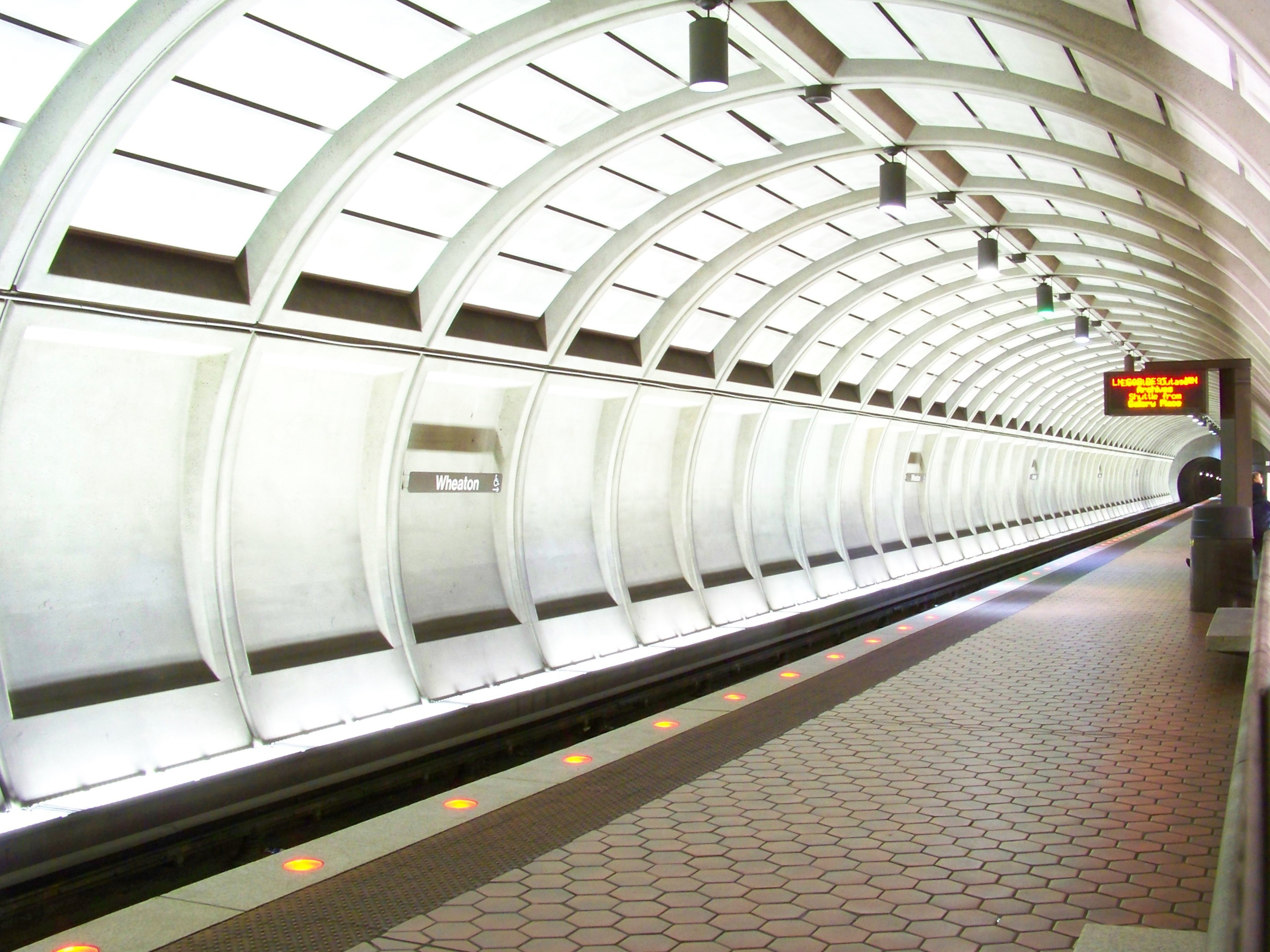
Wheaton Metro Center

Kemp Mill is serviced by Ride On bus numbers 8, 9 and during rush hours, number 31, as well as Metrobus route M12. Washington Metro service on the Red Line is also available in the nearby Wheaton Metro Station and Silver Spring Metro Station. The metro station is home to the longest single-span escalator in the Western Hemisphere.

== Education ==
Montgomery County Public Schools operates public schools.

Kemp Mill Elementary School, Odessa Shannon Middle School and Northwood High School are each in Kemp Mill.

Kemp Mill is a highly educated community, with 92.5% of the population having a high-school diploma or higher and 60.2% holding a bachelor's degree or higher (as of 2020).

== Notable people ==
- HaRav Gedaliah Anemer (1932–2010), founder of the Yeshiva of Greater Washington, posek
- Michael Auslin (b. 1967), historian, columnist, author
- Jonathan Banks (b. 1947), television and film actor
- Alex Bazzie (b. 1990), NFL player
- Erica Brown (b. 1966), writer and educator
- Jerry Ceppos (1946–2022), journalist and academic
- Norman Chad (b. 1958), sportswriter, poker broadcaster, columnist for ESPN
- Eliot A. Cohen (b. 1956), political scientist, counselor in the United States Department of State (2007–2009)
- George Daly, music executive
- Matt Drudge (b. 1966), creator and editor of the Drudge Report, author
- Shlomo Gaisin, singer and songwriter
- Josh Hart (b. 1995), NBA Player
- Richard Joel (b. 1950), president of Yeshiva University
- Jan Rose Kasmir, cultural icon, subject of historic picture at 1967 March on the Pentagon
- Samuel Kotz (1930–2010), mathematician and statistician
- H. David Kotz (b. 1966), Inspector General of the Peace Corps (2006–2007), Inspector General for the Securities and Exchange Commission (2007–2012)
- Benjamin F. Kramer (b. 1957), politician
- Rona E. Kramer (b. 1954), politician
- Sidney Kramer (1925–2002), politician, businessman, and philanthropist
- Daniel Kurtzer (b. 1949), U.S. Ambassador to Egypt (1997–2001), U.S. Ambassador to Israel (2001–2005)
- Yehuda Kurtzer (b. 1977), President of the Shalom Hartman Institute
- Annie Leibovitz (b. 1949), photographer and visual artist
- Dov Lipman (b. 1971), member of the Knesset (2013–2015)
- Rav Aaron Lopiansky, Rosh HaYeshiva of Tiferes Gedaliah (YGW), Jewish scholar, author, and educator
- David Makovsky (b. 1960), foreign policy scholar, author, journalist
- Rafael Medoff (b. 1959), historian, author, founding director of the David S. Wyman Institute for Holocaust Studies
- Bethany Mandel (b. 1986), columnist, political and cultural commentator
- Seth Mandel (b. 1982), author and editor
- Rabbi Yitzchok Merkin, leader of Torah Umesorah – National Society for Hebrew Day Schools
- Nicolas Muzin, political strategist
- George Pelecanos (b. 1957), author (detective and noir fiction), television producer and a television writer (The Wire)
- Evelyn Rosenberg (b. 1948), international artist, creator of the detonography method
- Azriel Rosenfeld (1931–2004), computer scientist and mathematician, pioneer of computer image analysis
- Ari Shaffir (b. 1974), comedian, actor, podcaster, writer, and producer
- Saul Jay Singer (b. 1951), legal ethicist and The Jewish Press columnist
- Matthew H. Solomson (b. 1974), Chief judge of the United States Court of Federal Claims (2025–present)
- Tevi Troy (b. 1967), U.S. Deputy Secretary of Health and Human Services (2007–2009)
- Dov S. Zakheim (b. 1948), businessman, writer, Comptroller of the Department of Defense (2001–2004)

== Demographics ==
Historical population
Census	Pop.	Note	%±
2000	9,956		—
2010	12,564		26.2%
2020	13,378		6.5%
source: 2010–2020

=== 2020 census ===
As of the 2020 census, Kemp Mill had a population of 13,378. The median age was 38.3 years. 25.9% of residents were under the age of 18 and 18.0% of residents were 65 years of age or older. For every 100 females there were 92.5 males, and for every 100 females age 18 and over there were 88.0 males age 18 and over.

100.0% of residents lived in urban areas, while 0.0% lived in rural areas.

There were 4,472 households in Kemp Mill, of which 35.7% had children under the age of 18 living in them. Of all households, 56.0% were married-couple households, 13.8% were households with a male householder and no spouse or partner present, and 26.9% were households with a female householder and no spouse or partner present. About 23.0% of all households were made up of individuals and 13.0% had someone living alone who was 65 years of age or older.

There were 4,653 housing units, of which 3.9% were vacant. The homeowner vacancy rate was 0.6% and the rental vacancy rate was 6.0%.

Racial composition as of the 2020 census
Race	Number	Percent
White	7,154	53.5%
Black or African American	2,378	17.8%
American Indian and Alaska Native	104	0.8%
Asian	929	6.9%
Native Hawaiian and Other Pacific Islander	3	0.0%
Some other race	1,347	10.1%
Two or more races	1,463	10.9%
Hispanic or Latino (of any race)	2,467	18.4%

=== Demographic estimates ===
The population density was 5,332 inhabitants per square mile. Non-Hispanic Whites were 55.1% of the population. Foreign-born persons accounted for 27.1% of the population, and 34.8% of residents spoke a language other than English at home, including Russian, Ukrainian, Hebrew, Yiddish, and Spanish.

=== Households and housing estimates ===
83.7% of occupied housing units were owner-occupied, and the median value of owner-occupied housing units was $518,100.

=== Income and poverty ===
The median household income in the CDP was $151,943, and the per capita income was $60,348. Of residents age 16 and older, 69.6% were in the civilian labor force, and 6.9% of the population lived below the poverty line.

=== 2010 census ===
As of the 2010 United States census, there were 12,564 people and 4,430 households residing in the area. The population density was 4,952.3 inhabitants per square mile (1,912.1/km^{2}). The racial makeup of the area was 61.7% White, 19.5% African American, 1% Native American, 5% Asian, 0.1% Pacific Islander, and 3.7% of mixed race. Hispanics and Latinos of any race were 18.6% of the population. Non-Hispanic whites were 54.8% of the population.

There were 3,386 households, out of which 33.9% had children under the age of 18 living with them, 65.3% were married couples living together, 9.6% had a female householder with no husband present, and 21.6% were non-families. 17.0% of all households were made up of individuals, and 8.7% had someone living alone who was 65 years of age or older. The average household size was 2.89 and the average family size was 3.22. Twenty-seven percent of Kemp Mill residents hold a graduate degree.

In the area, the population was spread out, with 25.1% under the age of 18, 5.6% from 18 to 24, 25.9% from 25 to 44, 24.7% from 45 to 64, and 18.7% who were 65 years of age or older. The median age was 41 years. For every 100 females, there were 95.6 males. For every 100 females age 18 and over, there were 91.5 males.

The median income for a household in the CDP was $89,294, and the median income for a family was $111,985. Males had a median income of $52,244 versus $41,285 for females. The per capita income for the area was $34,570. About 2.3% of families and 4.1% of the population were below the poverty line, including 2.6% of those under age 18 and 1.7% of those age 65 or over.

=== Ethnic communities ===
A large number of Russian-Jewish immigrants have settled in Kemp Mill, particularly since the 1980s. Due to the large Ethiopian and Jewish populations in Silver Spring and Washington, D.C., Kemp Mill is home to a sizeable community of Beta Israel (Ethiopian Jews).
