= Kemp Mill Synagogue =

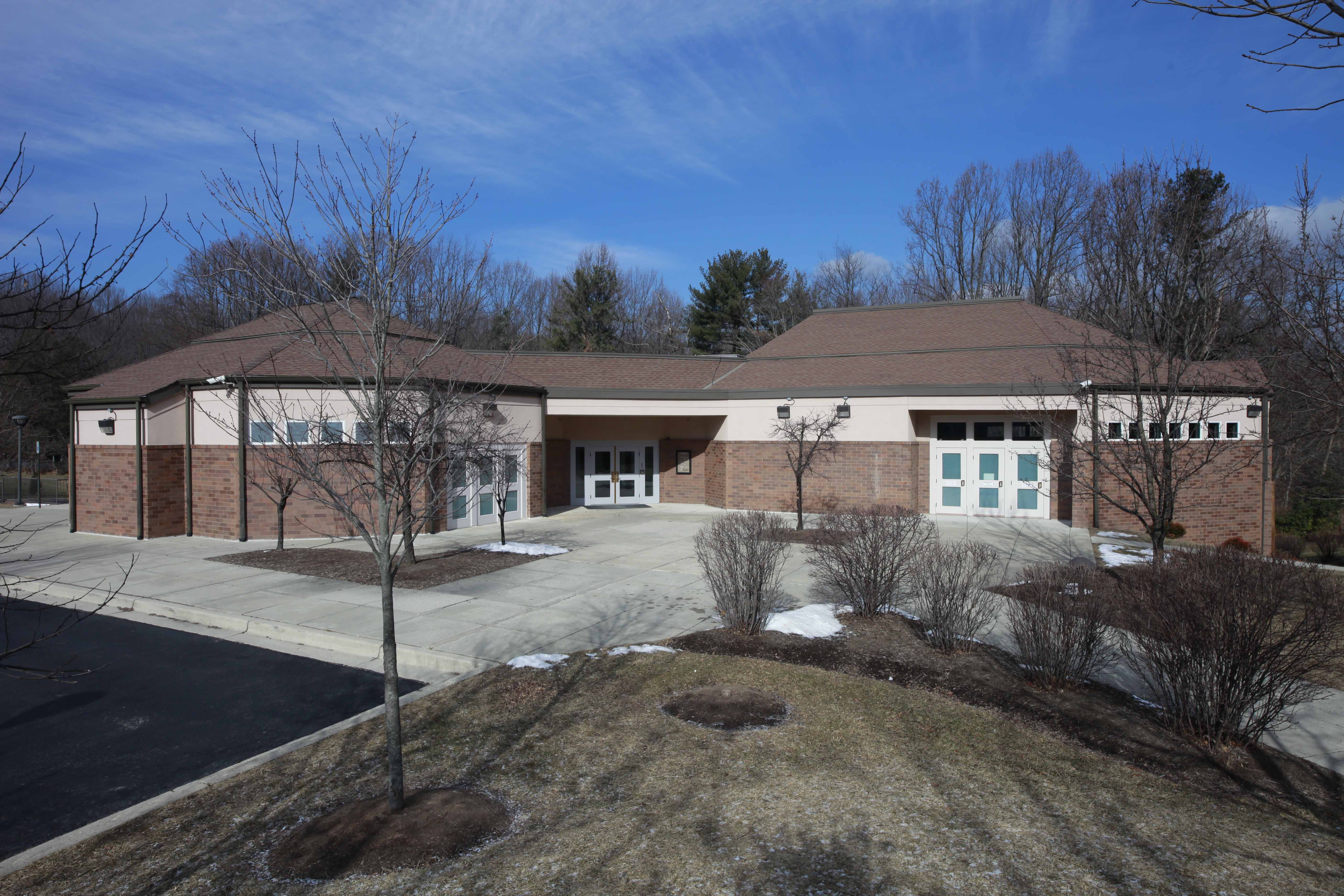
- Synagogue Entrance

- Location within Maryland

Religion
- Affiliation: Orthodox Judaism
- Ecclesiastical or organizational status: Synagogue
- Leadership: Rabbi Brahm Weinberg
- Status: Active

Location
- Location: 11910 Kemp Mill Rd, Silver Spring, MD 20902
- Interactive map of Kemp Mill Synagogue
- Coordinates: 39.051757°N 77.025227°W

Architecture
- Type: Synagogue
- Completed: 1998

Website
- https://www.kmsynagogue.org/

Kemp Mill Synagogue (KMS) is a Modern Orthodox Jewish congregation located in the Kemp Mill neighborhood of Silver Spring, Maryland, United States. Founded in 1990, it is one of several Orthodox congregations serving the densely Jewish Kemp Mill area in Montgomery County.

== History ==
Kemp Mill Synagogue held its first service on March 17, 1990, in a house that a group of ten investors had purchased to serve as a temporary home for the new congregation; about 50 worshipers attended. The investors went on to form an initial board of trustees and incorporated the congregation as a nonprofit organization. Jack Rozmaryn served as the founder and first president of the congregation.

Rabbi Jack (Yaakov) Bieler, an educator who had chaired the Talmud department at the Ramaz School and taught at the Berman Hebrew Academy, became the synagogue's first rabbi in 1994 and served as its spiritual leader until his retirement in 2015. The congregation moved into its current building on Kemp Mill Road in September 1998.

In August 2015, Rabbi Brahm Weinberg, a Montreal native who had previously led the Young Israel of West Hartford in Connecticut, succeeded Bieler as rabbi. Weinberg has also served in regional rabbinic roles, including as an officer of the Rabbinical Council of America and of the Vaad HaRabanim of Greater Washington.

== Beliefs and practices ==
A 2003 profile in The Forward described Kemp Mill Synagogue as a center of Modern Orthodox life in the Washington area whose members combined demanding professional careers with strict religious observance. The congregation's mission emphasized a brief and efficient prayer service, a strong commitment to Zionism, an environment welcoming to children, and broad participation in learning, with classes open to all and a regular women's prayer group. Most weekly sermons were delivered by lay members—both men and women—rather than by the rabbi. The synagogue's guiding documents also stress engagement with the wider non-Jewish community, and services have included a regularly recited prayer for members of the United States armed forces.

== Community ==
During its first decade the synagogue drew a membership that included a number of figures prominent in public life and policy. The Forward reported that Richard Joel, later president of Yeshiva University, was an active member, and that the congregation also counted among its members the strategic-studies scholar Eliot Cohen, former Under Secretary of Defense Dov Zakheim, White House aide Tevi Troy, and writer David Makovsky.

By the mid-2020s the congregation drew well over a thousand worshipers during the High Holidays and supported an extensive program of educational, social, and youth activities under an executive director. The synagogue added a yoetzet halacha (a woman trained to advise on Jewish law relating to family life) and community scholar to its staff in 2025. In the years after the October 2023 attacks on Israel, the congregation organized solidarity missions to Israel and held an annual gala in support of Israel-related causes.
