= Brookside Gardens =

Botanical gardens in Silver Spring, Maryland, US

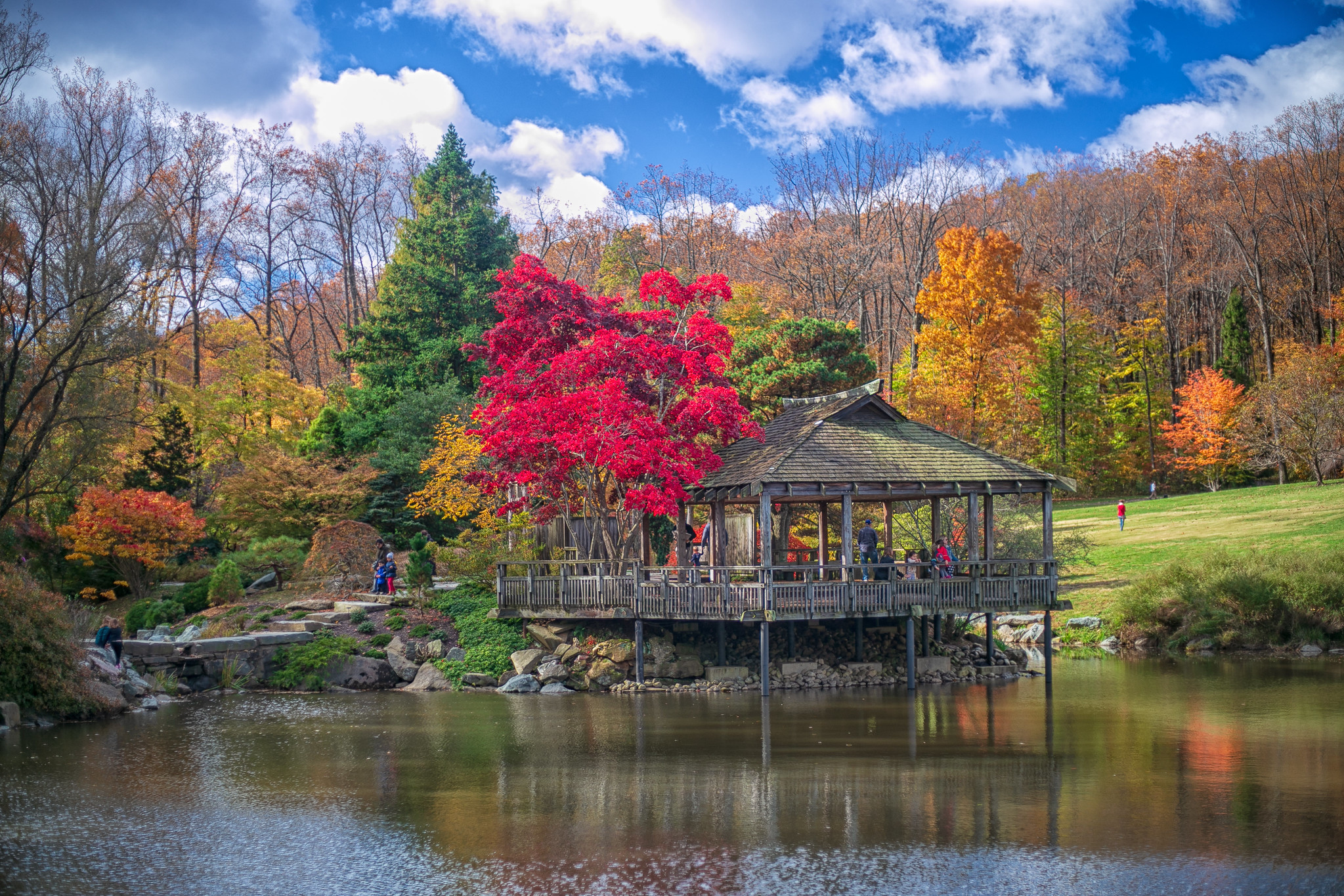
- Gude Garden teahouse in November 2018
- Established: 1969
- Location: Wheaton, Maryland
- Coordinates: 39°03′29″N 77°02′12″W
- Type: Botanical garden
- Website: www.montgomeryparks.org/parks-and-trails/brookside-gardens

Brookside Gardens is a 54-acre public display garden located in Wheaton Regional Park, at 1800 Glenallan Avenue, Silver Spring, Maryland. The gardens feature two conservatories and a variety of distinct garden areas. Brookside Gardens is operated by Montgomery Parks, part of the Maryland-National Capital Park and Planning Commission, and offers free admission to the public from sunrise to sunset.

== History ==
=== 20th century ===
Development of Brookside Gardens began in 1965 on land formerly owned by Stadler Nursery. Inspired by Longwood Gardens in Kennett Square, Pennsylvania, Commission landscape architect Hans Hanses provided the original design of Brookside Gardens, with the goal of dividing the landscape into discrete "rooms" showcasing plants that were readily available to local gardeners. Hanses later remarked that "the main idea for the garden was to supply the average homeowner with ideas for his own use. Everything you see here is not exotic, but something which grows well in the metropolitan area and which one can buy in any garden center."

After four years of development, Brookside Gardens opened to the public on July 13, 1969. The original grounds, covering 25 acres (10 ha), included three formal gardens leading to a wedding gazebo, an azalea walk, and a conservatory. Because the Commission lacked the funds to hire an architect, Carl Schoening, then Chief of Horticulture for Montgomery Parks, designed the conservatory himself. In its first year, Brookside Gardens hosted 35,000 visitors.

Beginning in 1972, new gardens were added to the property, initially including the Fragrance Garden, the Rose Garden, and the Gude Garden. The Japanese-inspired Gude Garden, which incorporates a large wooden tea house, was donated by Congressman Gilbert Gude to his father and nurseryman Adolph Gude. Later additions to Brookside Gardens included the Trial Garden for testing new annuals and the Aquatic Garden.

A donation from Elizabeth Turner made possible the construction of a multi-use Visitors Center, which opened in June 1998, and includes a gift shop, information desk, horticultural library, adult and children’s classrooms, auditorium, and offices classroom and meeting space.

=== 21st century ===
In 2004, the Commission dedicated a monument and terrace to the victims of the 2002 sniper shootings in Montgomery County. In 2006, staff and volunteers added a labyrinth to the Gude Garden, and in 2007, the Commission replaced the Rock Garden near the Conservatory entrance with a Rain Garden.

Brookside Gardens currently covers 54 acres (22 ha), with 32 acres of cultivated gardens. In 2024, approximately 414,150 people visited the gardens.

== Grounds and programs ==
Brookside Gardens features a variety of distinct garden areas, walking paths, gazebos, and two conservatories, which house a collection of tropical and seasonal plants. The gardens include:

- Aquatic Garden – water-loving plants with two ponds and gazebo.
- Azalea Garden – over 300 varieties of azaleas represented by 2,000 plants. Also rhododendrons, witchhazels, hollies, Japanese andromeda, sweet-box, skimmia, and shade-tolerant perennials.
- Butterfly Garden – Seasonal in summer only. Admission fee.
- Children's "School's Outside" Garden
- Conservatories – seasonal displays and special exhibits. The surrounding garden contains a collection of unusual conifers and groundcovers.
- Dry Stone Sphere – A stacked stone sculpture, by stone artist Devin Devine
- Fragrance Garden
- Gude Garden – a Japanese-style landscape with bamboo, beech, unusual conifers, dogwood, and groundcovers, as well as an island teahouse overlooking ponds
- Maple Terrace – raised beds within a planting of ‘Suminagashi’ Japanese maples
- Perennial Garden – wisterias, roses, Jasmine stephanense, buddleia, and Prunus × cistena, allium, geranium, sedum, panicum, lespedeza, calamagrostis, anemones, asters, acanthus, and agastache
- Reflection Terrace – a memorial to the ten individuals killed in the October 2002 D.C. sniper attacks
- Rock Garden – spring flowering bulbs with grasses and conifers
- Rose Garden – all types of roses, including hybrid tea, rugosa hybrids, grandiflora, English, miniature, floribunda, shrub, groundcover, polyantha, climber, Gallica, hybrid musk, and the garden rose
- Trial Garden – spring flowering bulbs, then summer displays of new and unusual plant varieties.
- Woodland Walk – forested wetland with bald cypress, tulip poplar, spicebush, and groundcover of mayapple, fern, and skunk cabbage. A native plant garden includes approximately 124 species and cultivars of Maryland native plants.
- Yew Garden – a garden room within yew hedges

Since 1997, Brookside Gardens has hosted a seasonal butterfly exhibit and an annual "Garden of Lights" light display during the holiday season.

== Gallery ==
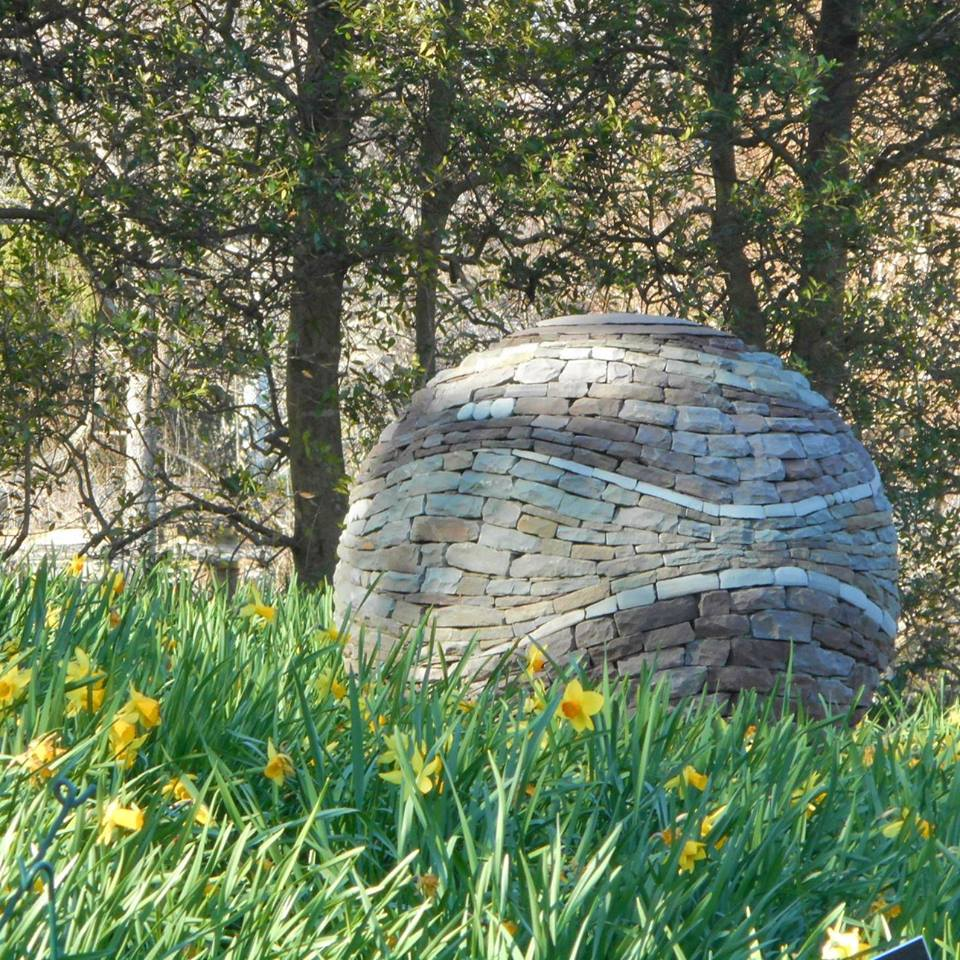
Dry Stone Sphere, by artist Devin Devine, completed September 2017
The Sniper Memorial at Brookside Gardens

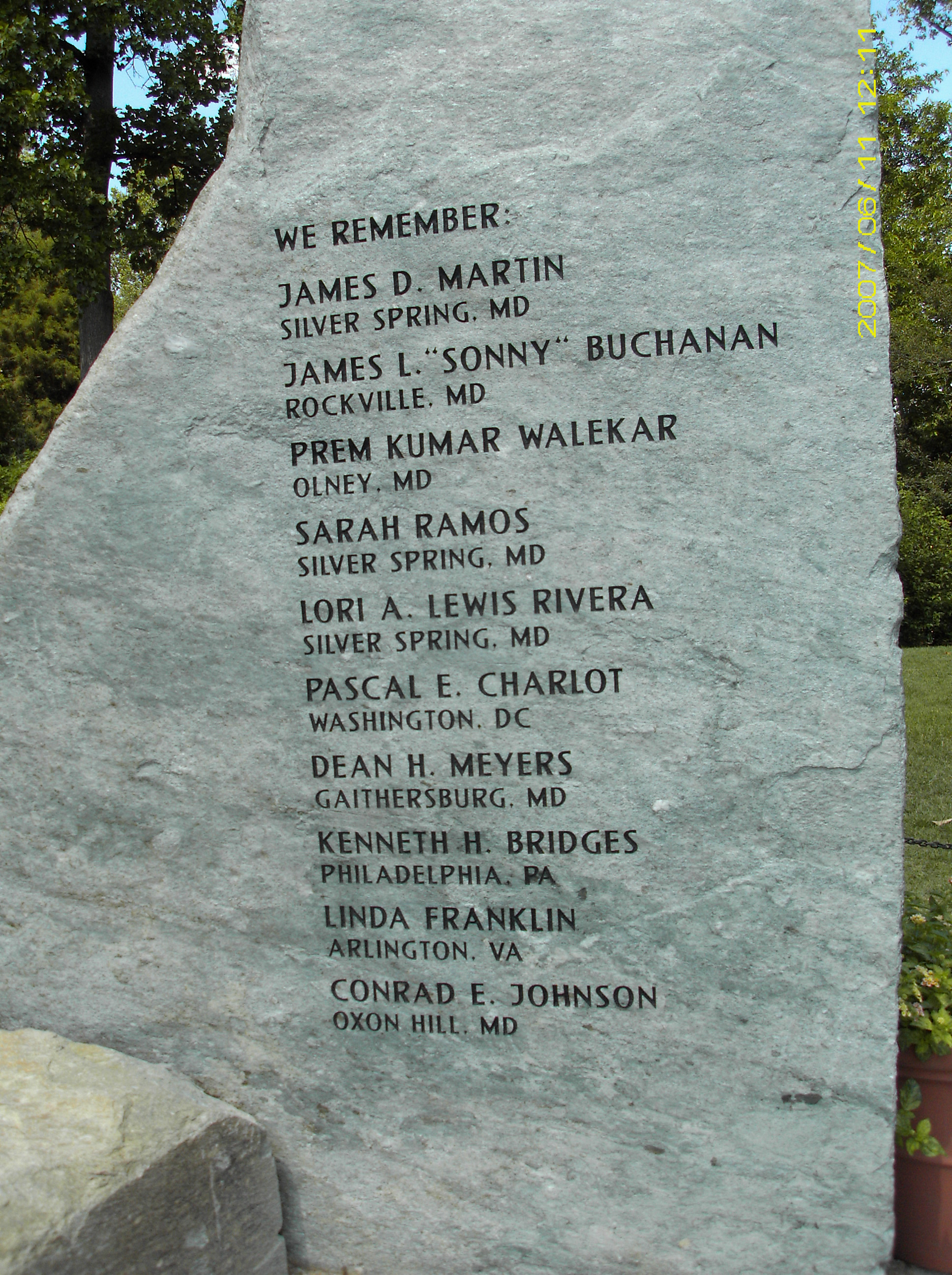
Names of victims at the Sniper Memorial

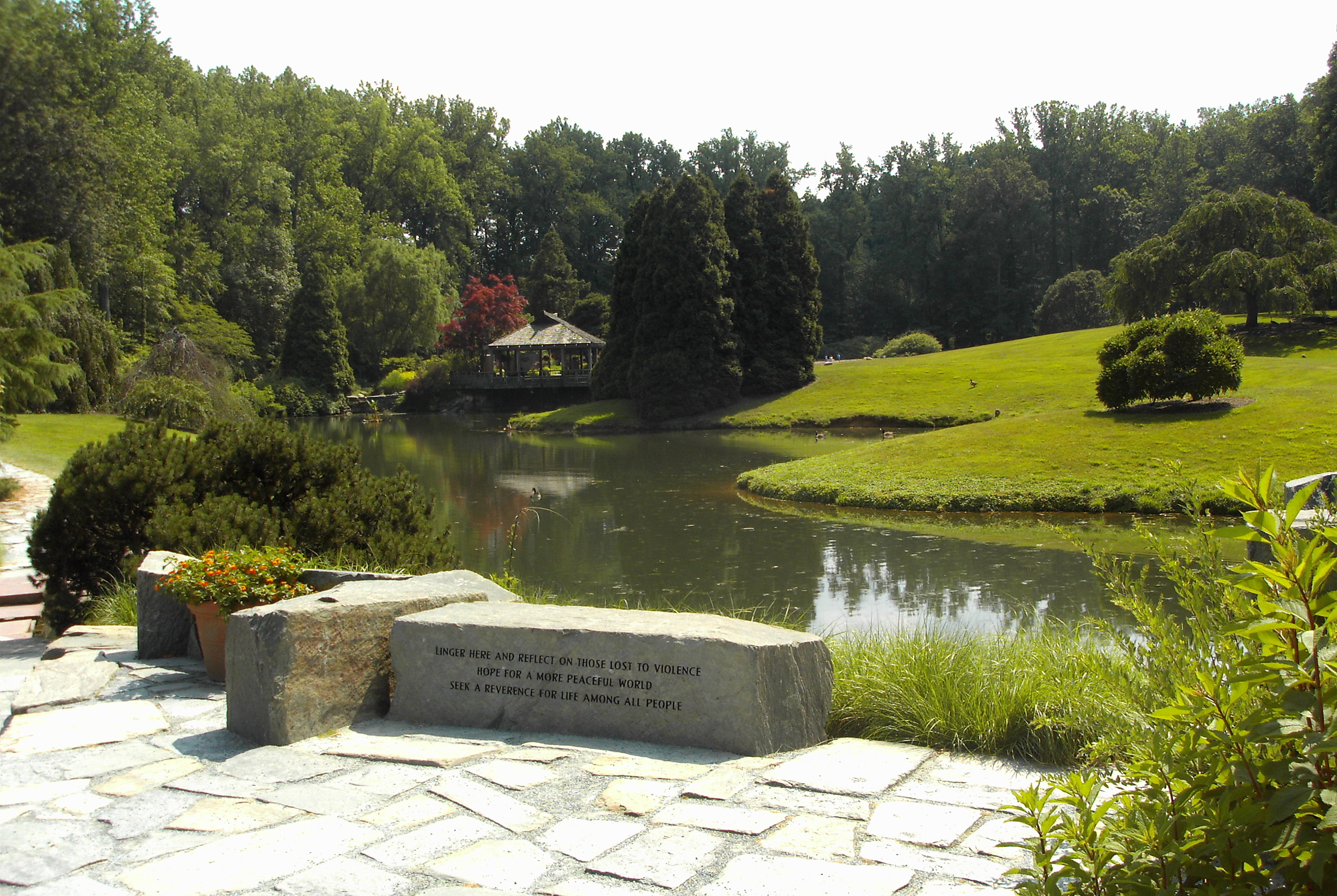
View from the Reflection Terrace over the Aquatic Garden

Close-up of the inscription at the pond at the Reflection Terrace

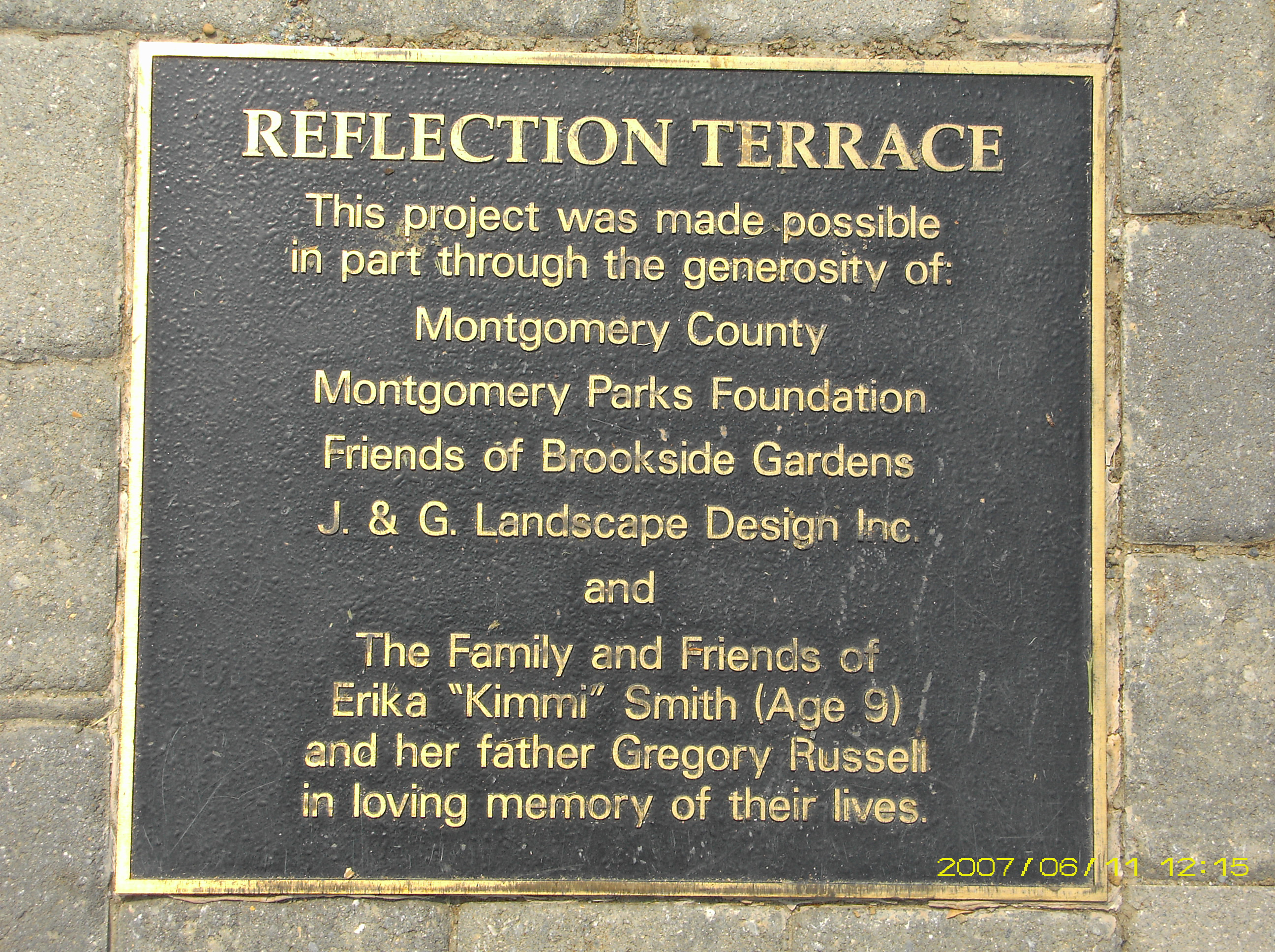
Dedication Plaque at the Reflection Terrace

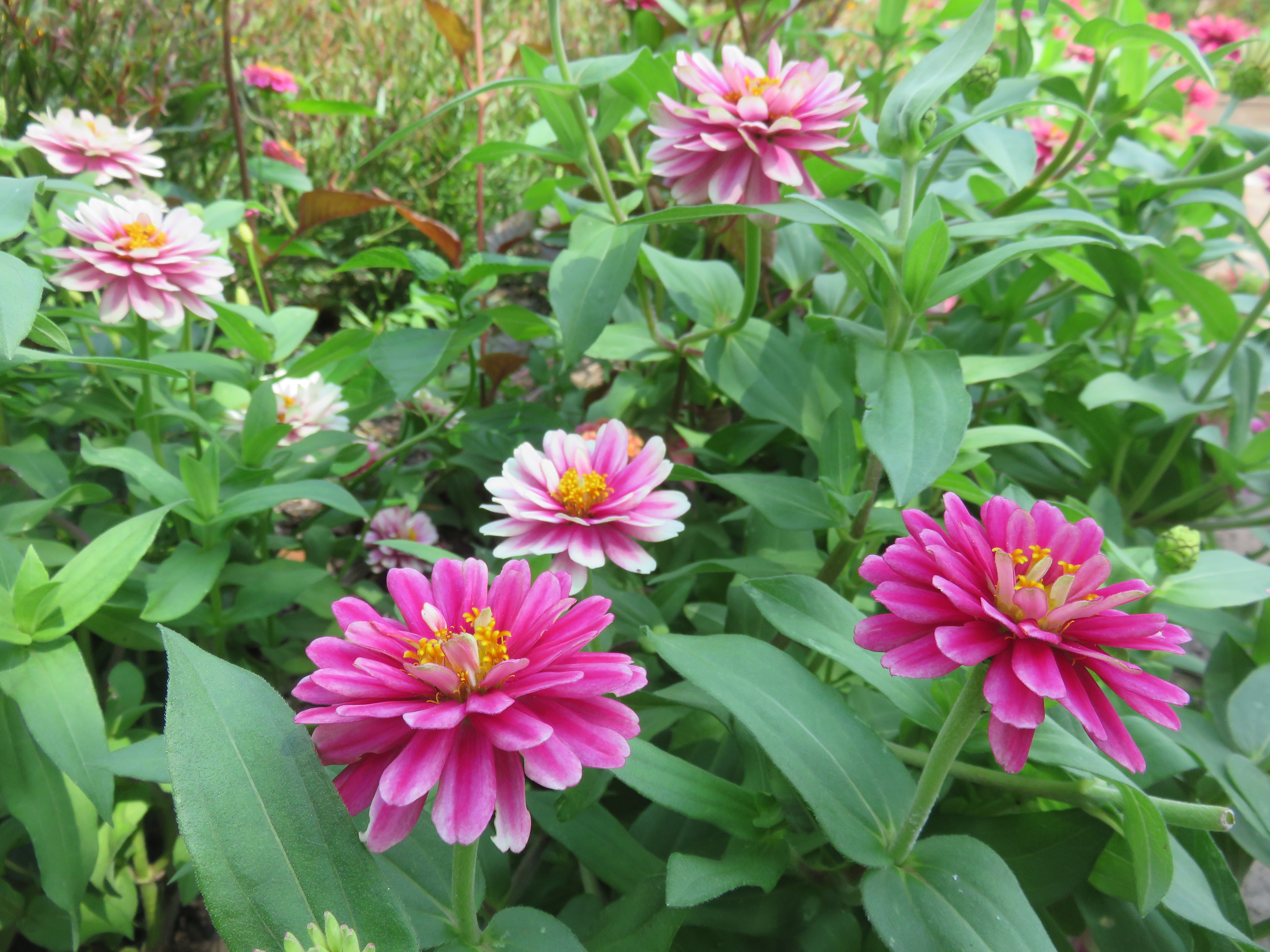
Flowers

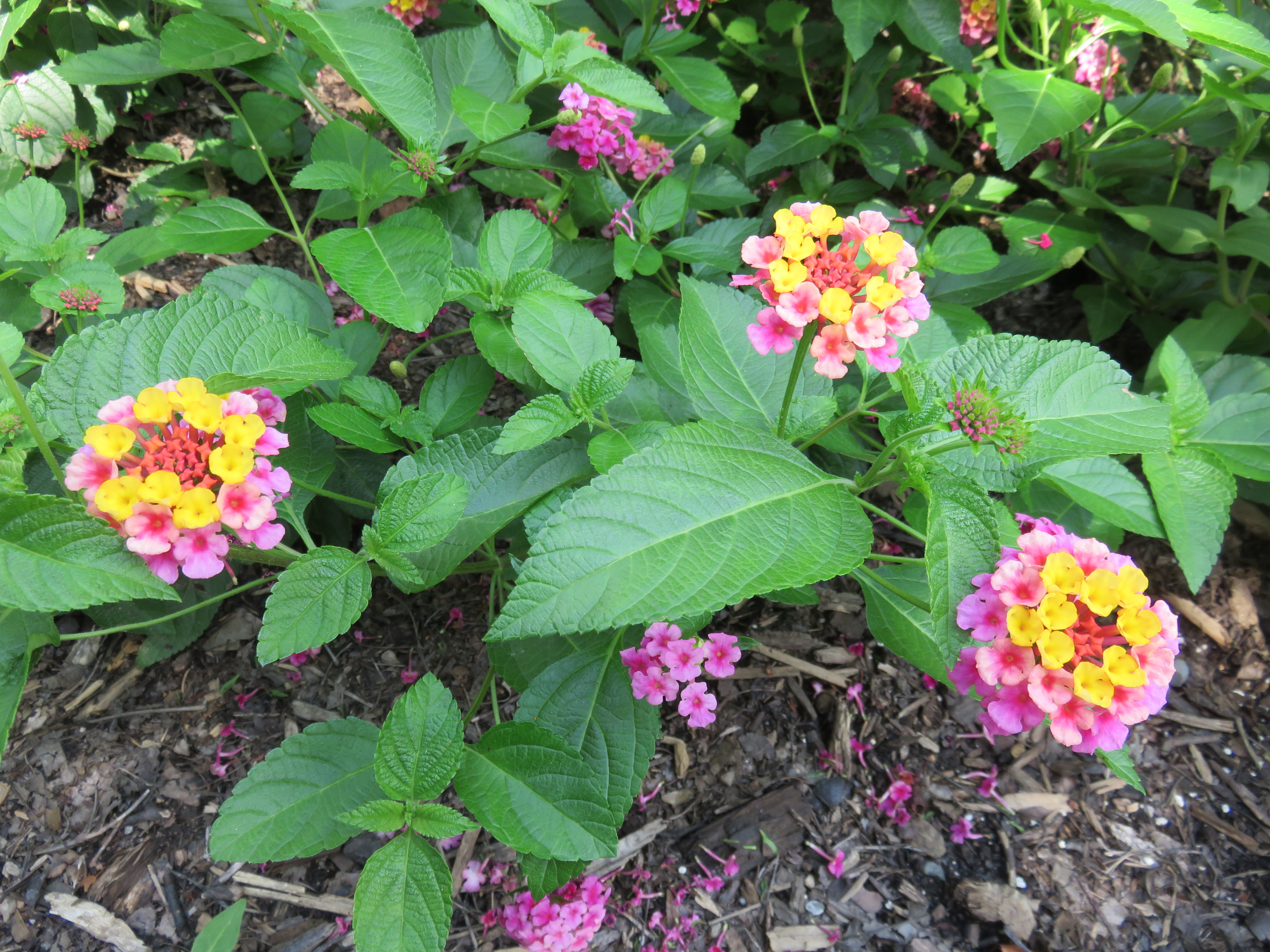
Flowers

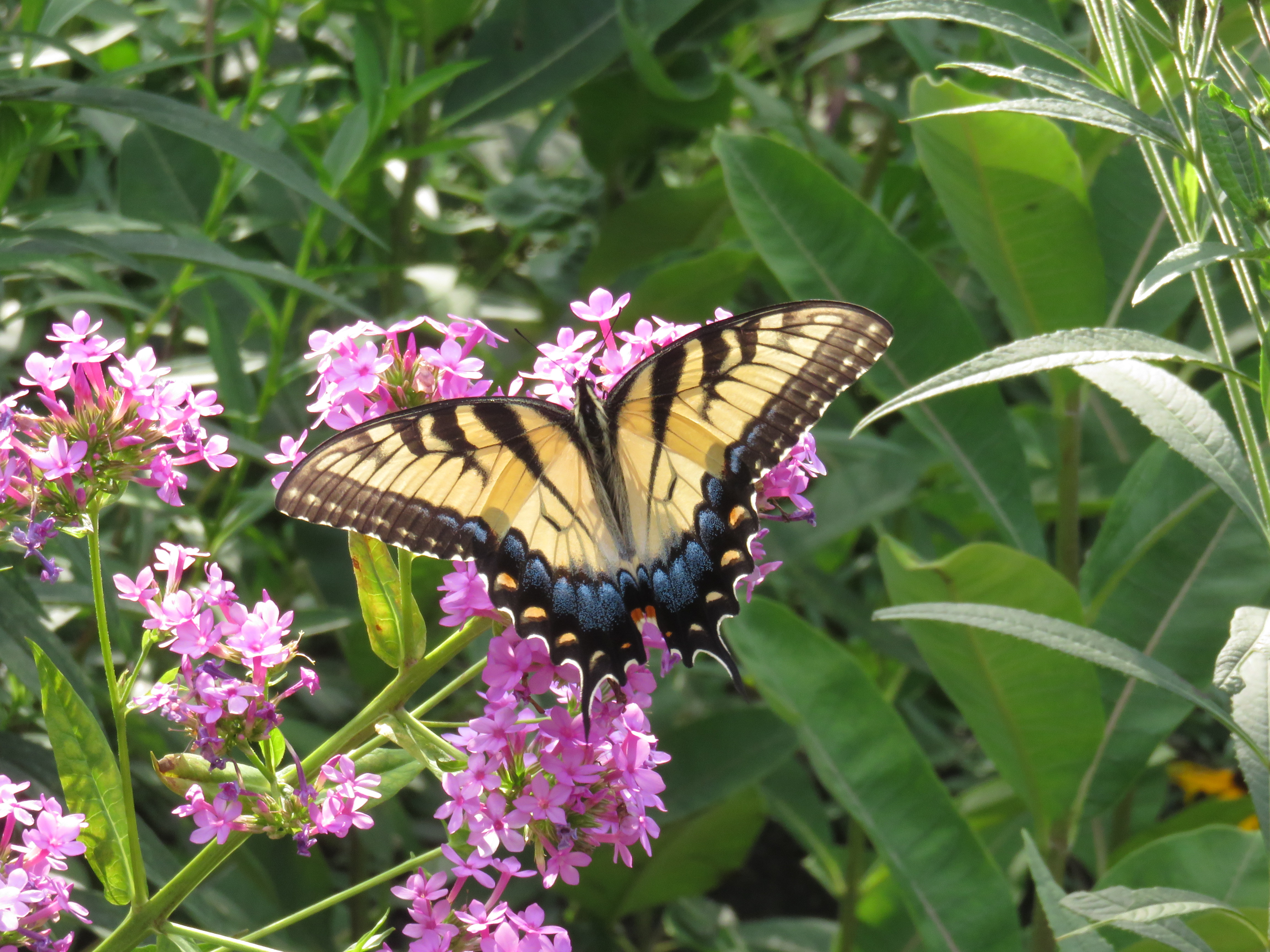
Flowers with butterfly

== See also ==
- List of botanical gardens in the United States
