= Tevi Troy =

American author, historian and government administrator (born 1967)

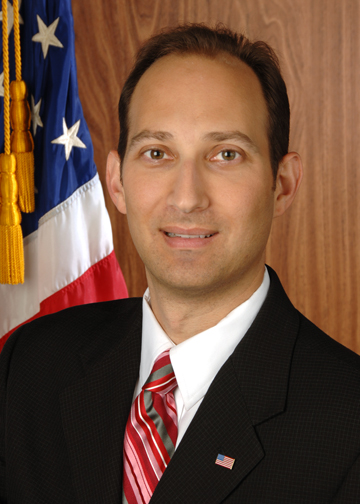

21st United States Deputy Secretary of Health and Human Services
- In office August 5, 2007 – January 20, 2009
- President: George W. Bush
- Preceded by: Alex Azar
- Succeeded by: Bill Corr

Personal details
- Born: Tevi David Troy; March 28, 1967 (age 59) Queens, New York, U.S.
- Party: Republican
- Spouse: Kami
- Children: 4
- Education: Cornell University (BS); University of Texas at Austin (MA, PhD)

Tevi David Troy (born March 28, 1967) is an American writer, political commentator, and the former United States Deputy Secretary of Health and Human Services (August 2007 – January 2009) during the Presidency of George W. Bush. He also served as a senior White House aide in the George W. Bush administration from March 2005 to July 2007. Troy founded the American Health Policy Institute and served as its CEO from 2014 to 2018. He is currently a Senior Fellow at the Bipartisan Policy Center.

== Personal history ==
Troy is the son of Elaine Troy and Bernard Dov Troy of Queens Village, New York, and a brother of Gil Troy and Dan Troy. He is an Orthodox Jew and member of the Kemp Mill Synagogue in Silver Spring, Maryland, where he lives with his wife, Kami (née Pliskow) and their four children.

== Education ==
Troy graduated from the Ramaz Upper School, a co-educational, college preparatory, private Modern Orthodox Jewish day school located on the Upper East Side of the New York City borough of Manhattan; he earned a B.S. from Cornell University and an M.A and Ph.D. in American Civilization from the University of Texas at Austin; and studied at the London School of Economics. He was a Claremont Institute Publius Fellow in 1991.

== Career ==
From 1998 to 2000, Dr. Troy served as the Policy Director for Senator John Ashcroft. From 1996 to 1998, Troy was Senior Domestic Policy Adviser and later Domestic Policy Director for the House Policy Committee, chaired by Christopher Cox.

Beginning in August 2003, he served at the White House as Deputy Cabinet Secretary and Liaison to the Jewish community where he advocated for more intense Republican outreach to the American Jewish community, noting that nearly 50 percent of Democratic donors are Jewish: "if you're going to take away some percentage of [those] donations to Obama, we're talking some serious money." After less than a year, in May 2004, Troy left the position of White House liaison to the Jewish community to work in the policy department of the 2004 Bush presidential campaign, at which time he was replaced by Noam Neusner (son of Jacob Neusner). As a member of the United States of America Mission to the OSCE, Troy was a member of the US delegation to a conference on antisemitism held in Berlin in April 2004.

He was the Deputy Assistant Secretary for Policy at the Department of Labor and a policy director in the Senate office of for Sen. John Ashcroft (R-MO), who later became Attorney General, an appointment which Troy supported enthusiastically in his article "My Boss the Fanatic" published in The New Republic.

Troy worked in the Bush administration White House as Deputy Assistant to the President for Domestic Policy from March 2005 to July 2007 and was appointed in August 2007 as Deputy Secretary in the Department of Health and Human Services, where he remained until January 2009.

Troy also serves as a member of the Bipartisan Commission on Biodefense, a group that encourages and advocates changes to government policy to strengthen national biodefense. In order to address biological threats facing the nation, the Blue-Ribbon Study Panel on Biodefense created a 33-step initiative for the U.S. Government to implement. Headed by former Senator Joe Lieberman and former Governor Tom Ridge, the Study Panel assembled in Washington D.C. for four meetings concerning current biodefense programs. The Study Panel concluded that the federal government had little to no defense mechanisms in case of a biological event. The Study Panel's final report, The National Blueprint for Biodefense, proposes a string of solutions and recommendations for the U.S. Government to take, including items such as giving the Vice President authority over biodefense responsibilities and merging the entire biodefense budget. These solutions represent the Panel's call to action in order to increase awareness and activity for pandemic-related issues.

From 2009 to 2022, Troy was a Senior Fellow at the Hudson Institute. From 2014 to 2018, He was the founder and CEO of the American Health Policy Institute. He is currently a Senior Fellow at the Bipartisan Policy Center.

== Published works ==
Troy is the author of three books and more than 250 articles published in The Wall Street Journal, Commentary, POLITICO, The Times Higher Education Supplement, The Washington Times, National Affairs, The Weekly Standard, National Review, and Reason, and an article in The New Republic entitled "My Boss the Fanatic", concerning "John Ashcroft's relations with the Jews on his staff."

- Intellectuals and the American Presidency: Philosophers, Jesters, or Technicians? 2002; Lanham: Rowman & Littlefield, 2003. Hardback ed. (May 2002; 280 pp.): ISBN 0-7425-0825-0; ISBN 978-0-7425-0825-5. Paperback ed. (2003): ISBN 0-7425-0826-9; ISBN 978-0-7425-0826-2.
- "My Boss the Fanatic". The New Republic January 29, 2001. Accessed April 30, 2007 (abstract; full article requires subscription; purchase). Rpt. in "An Office That Holds Bible Study Together...: An Orthodox Jewish Staffer Lauds John Ashcroft's Inclusion of Minority Religions in his Senate Office", Beliefnet.com, n.d. Accessed April 30, 2007, and on Troy's website.
- Fight House: Rivalries in the White House from Truman to Trump 2020; Regnery History ISBN 978-1621578369
- The Power and the Money: The Epic Clashes Between Commanders in Chief and Titans of Industry 2024; Regnery History ISBN 978-1684515400
