= Wheaton Regional Park =

Regional park in Montgomery County, Maryland, United States

- Wheaton Park
- Wheaton Regional Park
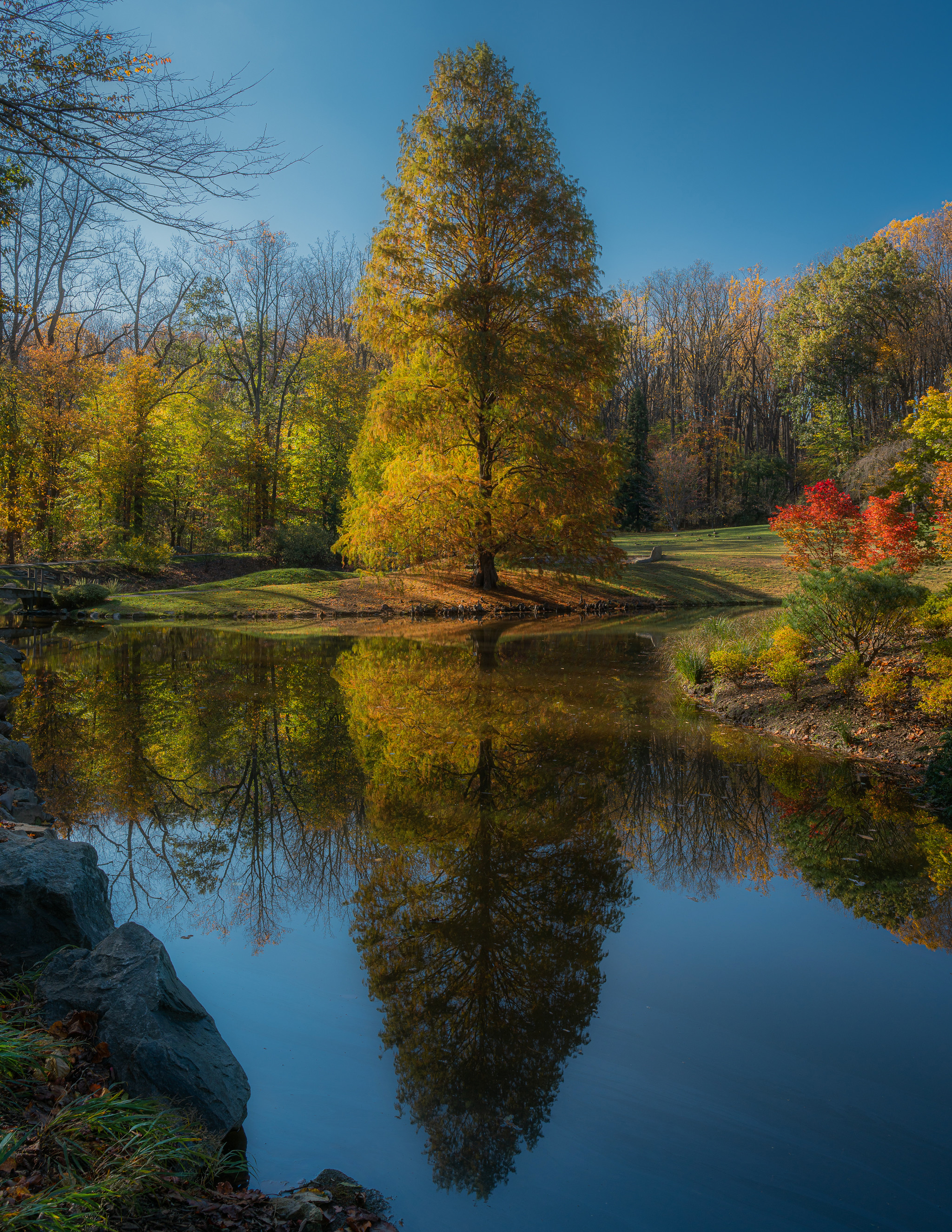
- Fall reflections, November 2019
- Interactive map of Wheaton Regional Park
- Type: Public park and protected area
- Location: Wheaton, Maryland, U.S.
- Nearest city: Washington, D.C.
- Coordinates: 39°03′04″N 77°02′35″W
- Area: 538.665 acres (217.990 hectares)
- Elevation: 407 ft (124 m)
- Created: 1960
- Owner: M–NCPPC
- Operator: Montgomery Parks
- Open: Sunrise to sunset
- Status: Open all year
- Water: Pine Lake and ponds
- Budget: $5,000,000 (FY19) (including improvements)
- Parking: 6 lots
- Public transit: Glenmont station (closest); Wheaton station
- Facilities: Brookside Gardens; F. Frank Rubini Athletic Complex; Wheaton Sports Pavilion; Brookside Nature Center; Wheaton Indoor Tennis Facility; Wheaton Ice Arena; Wheaton Miniature Train; Ovid Hazen Wells Carousel; Wheaton Riding Stables; Wheaton Regional Park Picnic Areas; Wheaton Regional Park Trails; Adventure Playground; Montgomery Dog Park
- Website: www.montgomeryparks.org/parks-and-trails/wheaton-regional-park/

Wheaton Regional Park is a public park and county-designated protected area, located in Wheaton, Maryland. It is operated and managed by Montgomery County Parks (Montgomery Parks), a division of a bi-county agency, Maryland-National Capital Park and Planning Commission (M–NCPPC), which serves both Montgomery and Prince George's counties in the Washington, D.C. suburbs of the state of Maryland. The park was established in 1960, incorporating several large parcels of land into one of the county's largest parks, at the size of 538.7 acres (218.0 hectares).

== Brookside Gardens ==
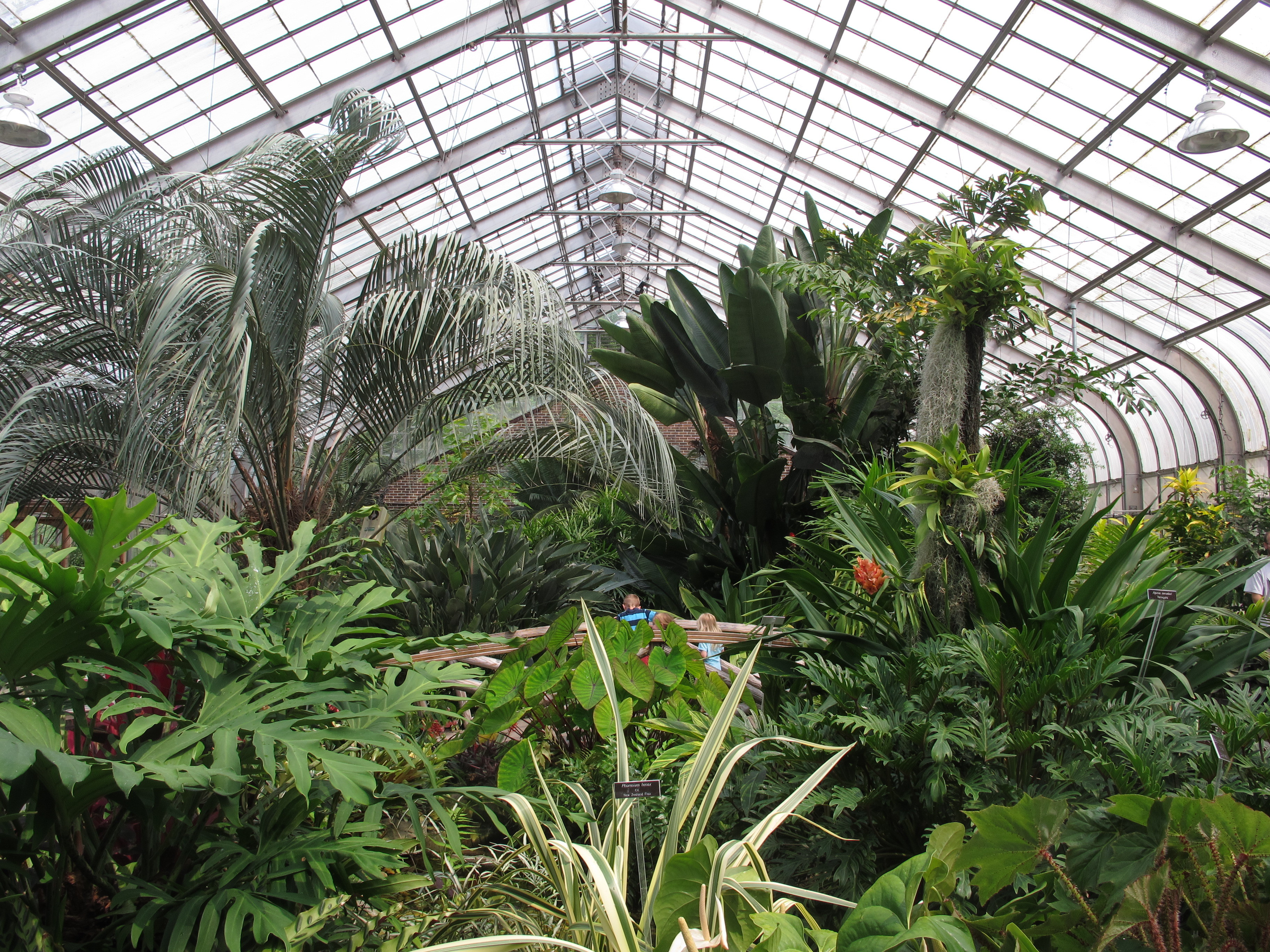
View inside conservatory

A public display botanical garden, Brookside Gardens, popular as a location for wedding couple photography, which utilizes an online reservation system for that purpose, is located on a 54-acre (21.85 ha) portion of the park, having expanded over time from its initial footprint of 24 acres (9.71 ha) in 1969. The gardens are known in the Washington metropolitan area for its seasonal Winter Garden of Lights show, garden railway exhibit, and Wings of Fancy live butterfly exhibit, along with its two perennial conservatories which house and cultivate tropical species.

== Park facilities ==
The park is delineated into three named areas based upon the particular area's proximity to one of Wheaton Regional's three main entrances: the Shorefield Area for the Shorefield Road entrance, the Glenallan Area for the Glenallan Avenue entrance, and the Orebaugh Area for the Orebaugh Avenue entrance. Brookside Gardens is located in the Glenallan Area.

Montgomery Parks provides various recreational facilities and activities at Wheaton Regional Park. These include:

- F. Frank Rubini Athletic Complex (Orebaugh Area)
- Wheaton Sports Pavilion (Orebaugh Area)
- Brookside Nature Center (Glenallan Area)

Naturalist-led educational offerings
Local natural history exhibits

- Pine Lake (Shorefield area)

Fishing permitted

- Wheaton Indoor Tennis Facility (Orebaugh Area)
- Wheaton Ice Arena (Orebaugh Area)

Ice skating and instruction
Ice hockey

- Wheaton Miniature Train (Shorefield area)

Purchase of tickets required for train rides

- Ovid Hazen Wells Carousel (Shorefield area)

On loan to Wheaton Regional Park; its ultimate home is Ovid Hazen Wells Recreational Park
Purchase of tickets necessary for carousel rides

- Wheaton Riding Stables (Glenallan Area)

Escorted and guided trail rides
Novice through advanced lessons in an indoor riding arena or outdoor facility
Children's summer camps
Boarding of horses

- Wheaton Regional Park Picnic Areas (Shorefield area)

Eight picnic shelters, reservation and permit required; each one accommodates up to 40 people.
Grills, picnic tables, and other picnic related amenities available on a first-come, first-served basis

- Wheaton Regional Park Trails (Shorefield area)
- Adventure Playground (Shorefield area)
- Montgomery Dog Park (Orebaugh Area)

== Park history ==
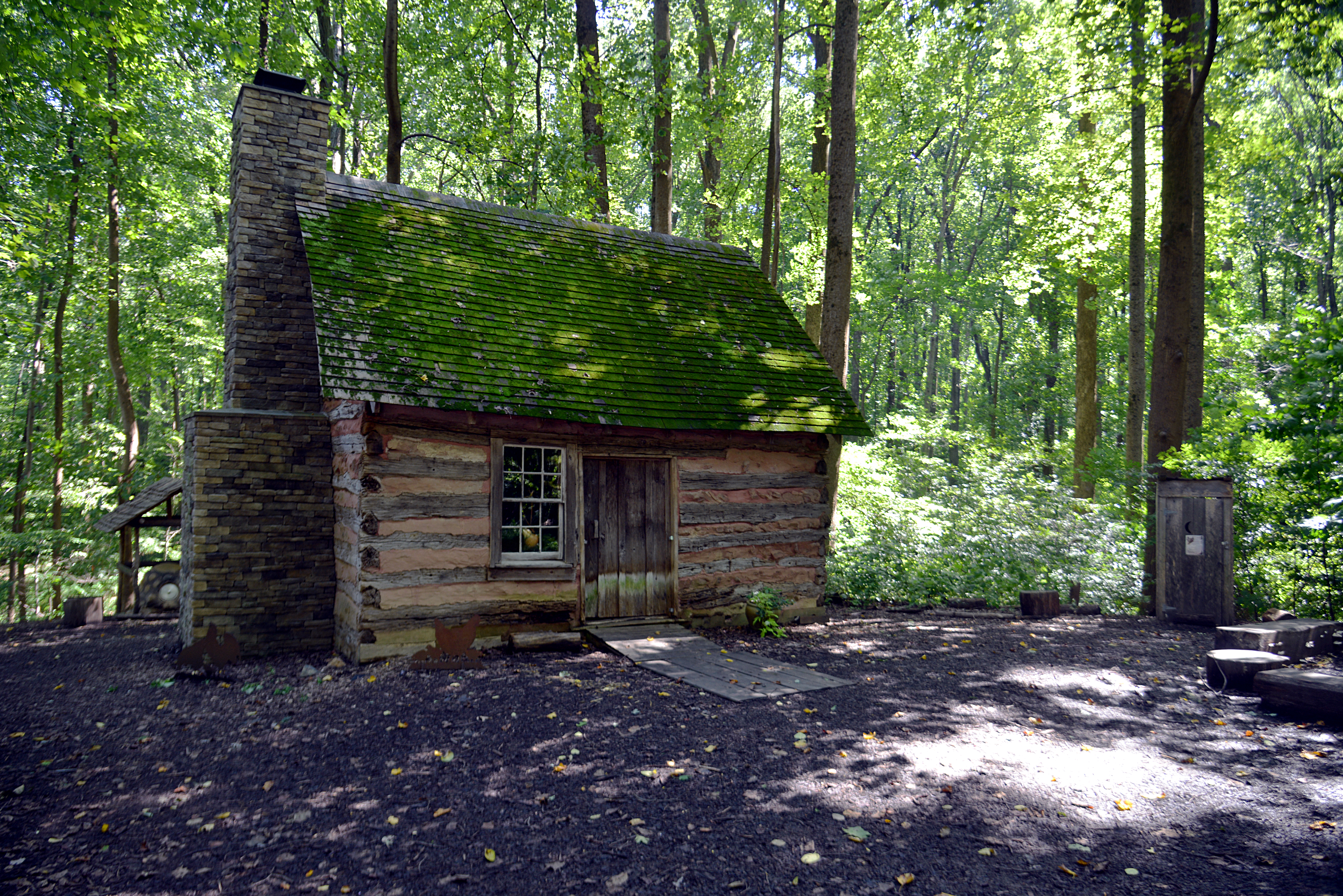
Harper family homestead

The park includes the Harper Family Log House, as part of its Brookside Nature Center. This 1½ story log cabin, historically known as the Richard Thomas Harper House, was built in the 1870s, in Poolesville, Maryland, located in western Montgomery County. In 1976, the Maryland-National Capital Park and Planning Commission (M–NCPPC) dismantled the house and reassembled it in Wheaton Regional Park, to serve as an exemplar of a pioneer cabin, for the United States Bicentennial. Throughout the late 19th and first half of the 20th centuries, the log house was the home of an African-American landowning family. It consisted of one downstairs room and two upstairs rooms. It had a large stone fireplace with a brick stack. The parents in the family raised a total of 15 children in this three room house, although not all of the children lived there at the same time.

The park is also the home to the Ovid Hazen Wells Carousel and a miniature train. The Herschell Spillman carousel, constructed in 1915, by the Herschell Spillman Company, in North Tonawanda, New York, operated as the Smithsonian Carousel on the National Mall from April 12, 1967, until 1981. The musical carousel has 33 jumping horses, three zebras, and two chariots. It was purchased by the M–NCPPC and is on loan to Wheaton Regional Park, with its future home designated to be the Ovid Hazen Wells Recreational Park, in Clarksburg, Maryland, which is located in northern Montgomery County.

The Wheaton Miniature Train is a replica of 1863 C. P. Huntington engine and passenger cars; it takes passengers on a short tour of the park. The train and carousel operate weekends only in April and September and daily from May through August.
