= Sturm (surname) =

Sturm is a German surname. Notable people with the surname include:

- Alexander McCormick Sturm (1923–1951), American artist, author, and entrepreneur
- Alfred Sturm (1888–1962), German general
- Anton Sturm (1690–1757), Tyrolean sculptor
- Andreas Sturm (born 1986), German politician
- August Sturm (businessman) (1865–1943), American businessman
- August Sturm (gymnast) (1912–1990), Austrian gymnast
- Bernd Sturm (born 1952), German football player and manager
- Christian Sturm (born 1978), German tenor
- Christoph Christian Sturm (1740–1786), German preacher and author
- Claudia Sturm (born 1962), German handball player
- Daniel Sturm (born 1970), German-American journalist
- Daniel Sturm (politician) (born 1977), German politician
- Danijel Šturm (born 1999), Slovenian footballer
- Dorothy Sturm (1910–1988), American medical illustrator
- Ephraim Sturm (1924–2015), Jewish leader
- Erdmann Sturm (born 1937), German theologian
- Eugen Sturm-Skrla (1894–1943), Hungarian-born Austrian painter
- Felix Sturm (born 1979 as Adnan Ćatić), Bosnian-German boxer
- Fini Sturm (born 1995), German rower
- Florian Sturm (born 1982), Austrian footballer
- Frank Pearce Sturm (1879–1942), English poet and translator
- Friedrich Sturm (1823–1898), Austrian artist
- Friedrich Otto Rudolf Sturm (1841–1919), German mathematician
- Hanna Sturm (1891–1984), labour rights and peace activist
- Hans Sturm (actor) (1874–1933), German actor
- Hans Sturm (footballer) (1935–2007), German footballer
- Heinrich Sturm (1920–1944), German military aviator
- Helmut Sturm (1932–2008), German artist
- Herman Sturm, military leader
- Ike Sturm (born 1978), American bassist
- J.Sturm family, three generations of German artists and naturalists:
  - Johann Georg Sturm (1742–1793), German natural history illustrator, father of Jacob Sturm
  - Jacob Sturm (1771–1848), German engraver and naturalist, son of Johann Georg Sturm and father of J.W. and J.H.C.F.Sturm; "Sturm" as a botanical author
  - Johann Heinrich Christian Friedrich Sturm (1805–1862), German engraver and ornithologist, son of Jacob Sturm and brother of J.W.Sturm
  - Johann Wilhelm Sturm (1808–1865), German botanist, ornithologist, and engraver, son of Jacob Sturm and brother of J.H.C.F.Sturm; "J.W.Sturm" as a botanical author
- Jacob Sturm von Sturmeck (1489–1553), German statesman and Reformation leader
- Jacquie Sturm (born as Te Kare Papuni, 1927–2009), New Zealand writer
- Jacques Charles François Sturm (1803–1855), French-Swiss mathematician
- James Sturm (born 1965), American cartoonist
- Jani Šturm (born 1982), Slovenian footballer
- Jerry Sturm (1936–2020), American gridiron football player
- Joel Sturm (born 2001), German racing driver
- Johann Sturm (1635–1703), German philosopher
- Johannes Sturm (1507–1589), German Protestant reformer
- Johannes Sturm (physician) (1570–1625), German physician and logician
- Johnny Sturm (1916–2004), American baseball player
- Joshua Sturm (born 2001), Austrian alpine ski racer
- Julius Sturm (1816–1896), German poet
- Karl-Theodor Sturm (born 1960), German mathematician
- Katja Sturm-Schnabl (born 1936), linguist and historian
- Klemen Šturm (born 1994), Slovenian footballer
- Lacey Sturm (née Mosley, born 1981), American singer and songwriter
- Lovro Šturm (1938–2021), Slovenian jurist and politician
- Marco Sturm (born 1978), German hockey player and coach
- Matthew Sturm (born 1972), rugby league footballer
- Meyer J. Sturm, American architect
- Nico Sturm (born 1995), German ice hockey player
- Pavle Jurišić Šturm (1848–1922), Serbian army general
- Peter Sturm (1909–1984), Austrian and East German actor
- Philipp Sturm (born 1999), Austrian footballer
- Ralf Sturm (born 1968), German footballer
- Reiner Sturm (1950–2003), German murderer
- Simon Stürm (born 1973), Swiss rower
- Sören Sturm (born 1989), German ice hockey player
- Stephan Sturm (born 1963), German businessman
- Terry Sturm (1941–2009), New Zealand academic
- Yfke Sturm (born 1981), Dutch model
- Wilhelm Sturm (1940–1996), German footballer
- Willi Sturm (1928–1993), German water polo player

== See also ==
- Strum (surname)
- Joannes Sturmius Mechlinianus (1559–1650), Belgian mathematician, physician, and poet
