= Strum (disambiguation) =

A strum is the act of brushing one's fingers over the strings of a string instrument.

Strum may also refer to:

== Places ==
- Strum, Albania, a village in Roskovec municipality, Fier County, Albania
- Strum, Wisconsin, a village, United States

== People ==
- Strum (surname), a surname
- Shirley C. Strum, primatologist specialising in the study of baboons
- Shirley Strum Kenny, (born 1935), President of the State University of New York
- Pavle Jurišić Šturm, (1848-1922) Serbian general of Sorbian origin

== Other uses ==
- Strum (grape), a red wine grape

== See also ==
- Strom Thurmond
- Strom Thurmond Federal Building and United States Courthouse
- Strom Thurmond High School
- Sturm (disambiguation)
