= August Sturm =

August Sturm may refer to:

- August Sturm (businessman), American businessman
- August Sturm (gymnast), Austrian gymnast
