= St. Ulrich (Amendingen) =

St. Ulrich is a baroque church located in Amendingen

Coordinates: 48°0′20″N 10°10′42″E

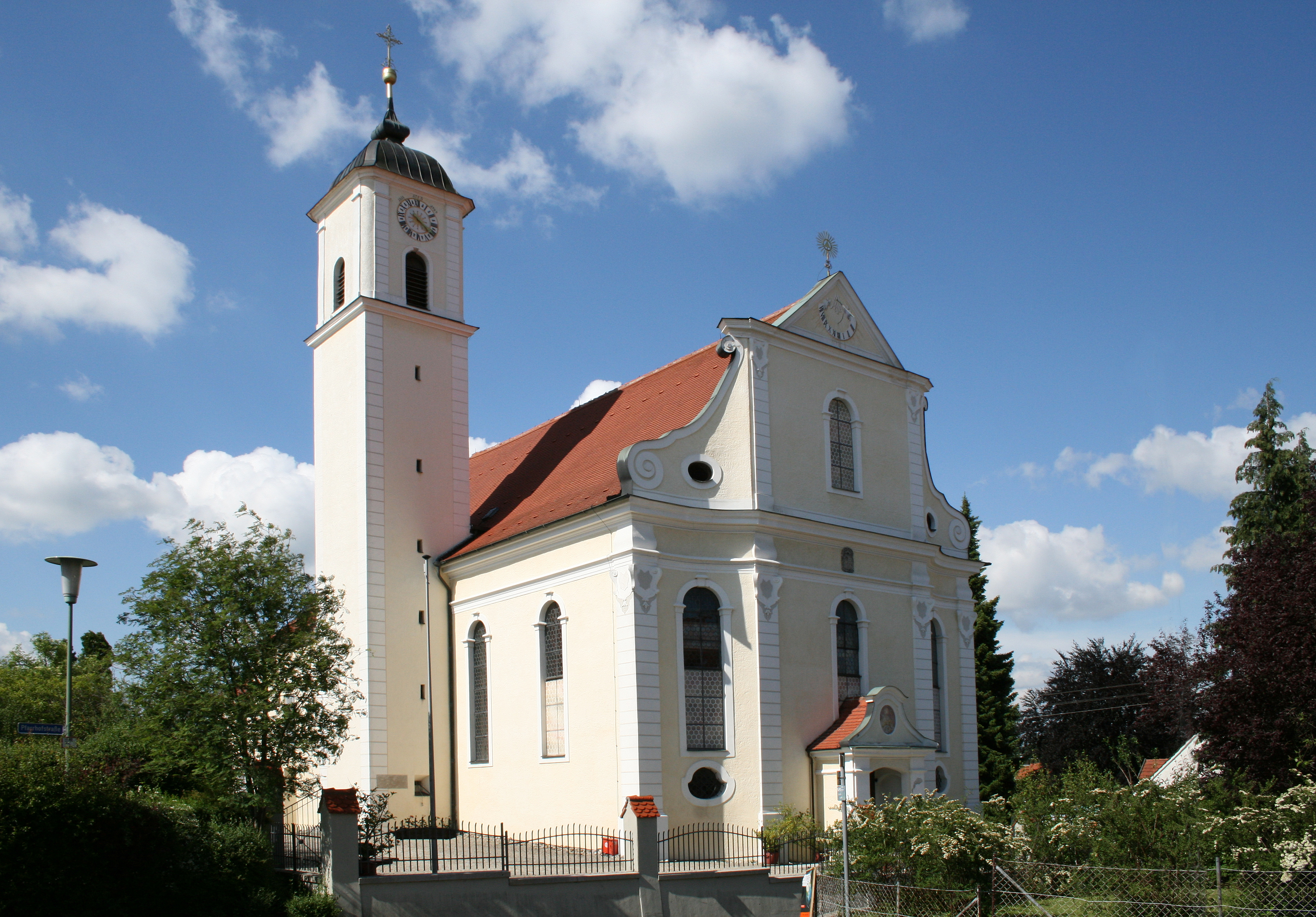
Church St. Ulrich in Memmingen

The Catholic parish church St. Ulrich is a Baroque church of the 18th century in Amendingen (a district of Memmingen, Germany).

Its patron saint is Bishop Ulrich of Augsburg, whose patronal festival is celebrated on July 4. The aisleless church, completed in 1755, stands in the north of the district, in the so-called Altdorf, on a hill of the Memminger Achtal and is a stop on the Upper Swabian Baroque Route.

== Location and surroundings ==
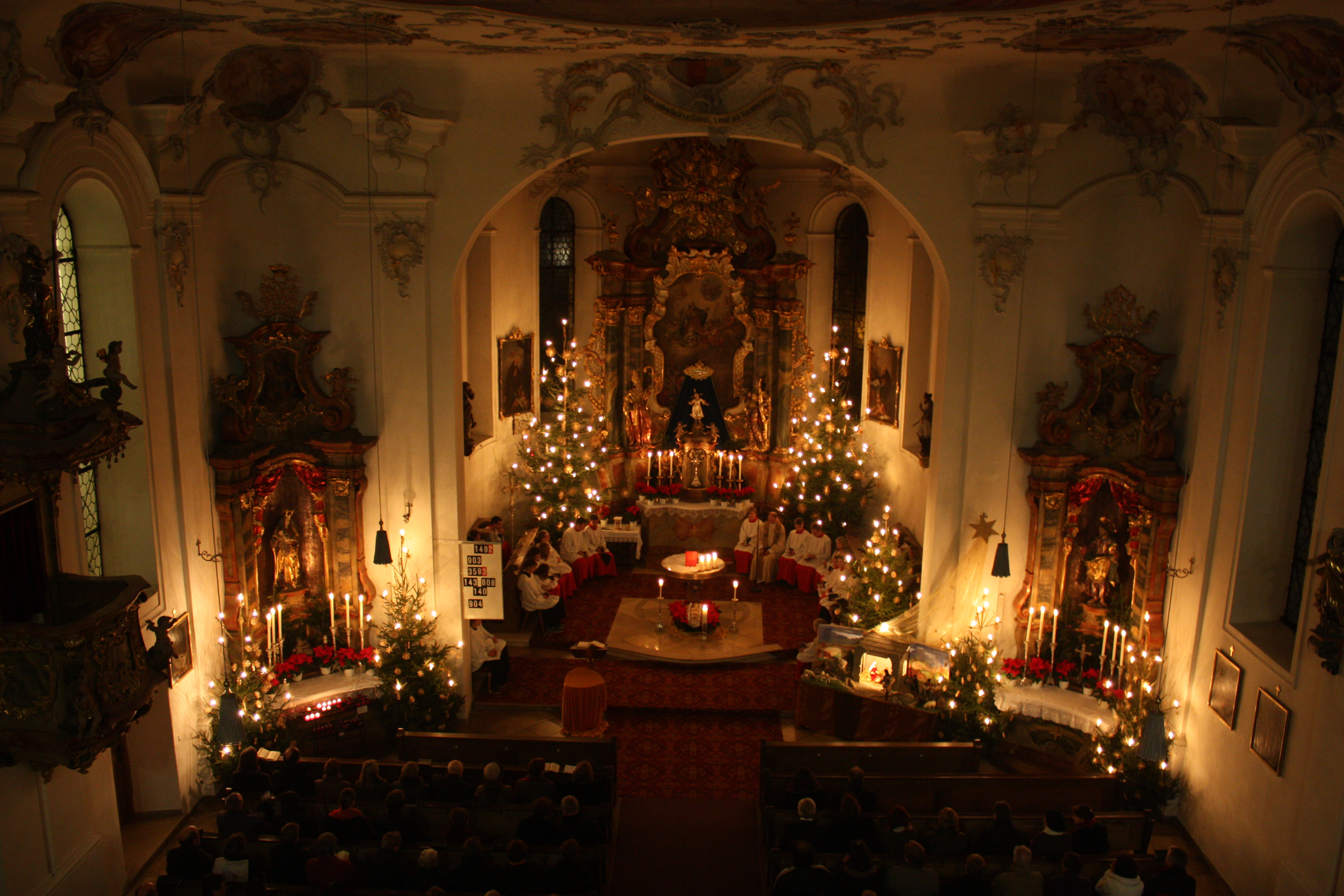
View from the second matroneum onto the nave and into the high choir during the Christmas Mass 2009

The church stands in the northern part of the Amendingen district in the so-called Altdorf on a hill of the Memminger Achtal. It is surrounded by a retaining wall, which merges into a churchyard wall to the west and south. Within this churchyard wall, to the west of the church, stands the old mortuary, which has been converted into a chapel and contains a statue of the flagellated Savior. To the north and northeast, outside the churchyard wall, are the parish house and the rectory. Of the old buildings, only an Upper Swabian farm has survived to the east. The loose development in the west with other farms below the church was condensed in the 1980s in favor of a new development area with residential buildings. To the north is the cemetery with a funeral hall.

== History ==
=== Predecessor buildings ===
In Frankish times, around the year 800, the first church was built in Amendingen, presumably as a simple wooden building. The parish was first mentioned in a document in 1341, when Heinrich III von Schönegg, Bishop of Augsburg, incorporated it into the Rot an der Rot abbey, which belonged to the diocese of Constance, with the approval of the antipope Nicholas V. The church was then incorporated into the diocese of Augsburg. This meant that the Rot abbey owned half of the major tithe associated with the right of patronage. In 1422, Bishop Anselm von Nenningen imposed an interdict on the parish, which was lifted at the request of the Duke of Teck at the feast of Pentecost. In 1477, the Buxheim Charterhouse bought the other half of the major tithe and thus half of the patronage right. St. Ulrich was first mentioned as patron of the church in 1484. A visitation report of 1575 describes that the high altar had sculptures of Ulrich, Theotokos, and St. Catherine.

During the Reformation, many citizens of Amendingen changed to the Protestant denomination. The members of the Sättelin patrician family, as owners of the Eisenburg lordship and thus of Amendingen, had become Protestants as citizens of Memmingen. The Neubronn family, as their successors, had also accepted the new doctrine as citizens of Ulm. The church records show that 150 of the 600 subjects in the dominion remained Catholic. Although the dominion was Protestant, the superior Advocatus remained Catholic. The resulting differences were settled by a treaty in 1586, thirty years after the Peace of Augsburg. This stipulated that the lords of Eisenburg belonged to the Protestant confession, while the subjects belonged to the Catholic confession. Provided that the subjects had accepted the new denomination, they were allowed to practice it for another eight years. After that they had to return to Catholicism under threat of punishment. The Amendingen priest Gallus Möslin did particularly well in persuading most of them to convert before the eight years were up.

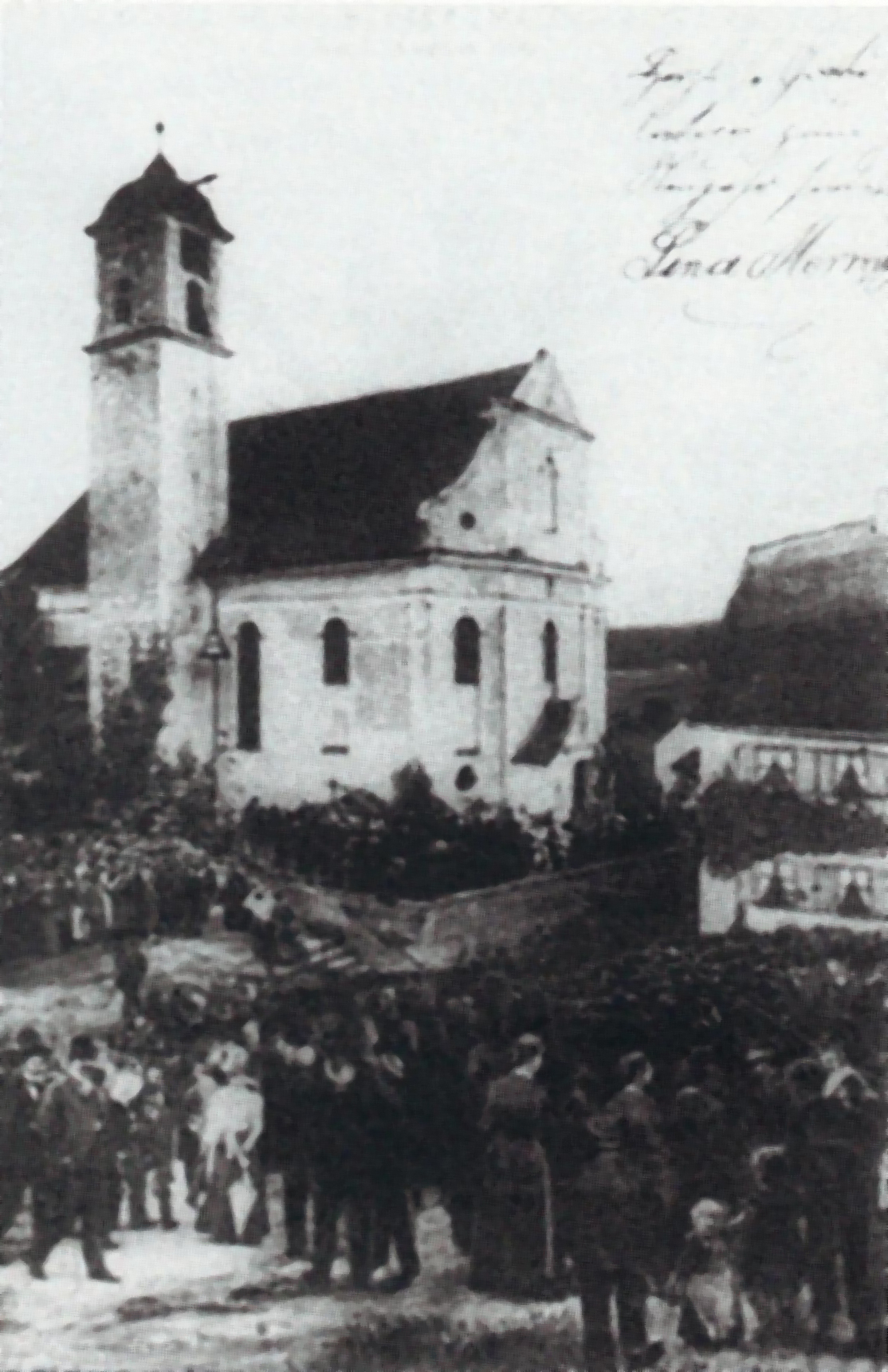
Consecration of a bell on August 5, 1900

Towards the end of the Thirty Years' War, on July 16, 1642, the Rot an der Rot abbey sold its part of the right of patronage with the tithe to the Charterhouse of Buxheim for 9000 guilder, which thus exercised the full patronage right. There it remained until the secularization in 1803. The tower of the church collapsed in 1655 and destroyed large parts of the nave. A makeshift building was consecrated in 1661. Sources on the building history of the present church are very scanty. The Amendingen archives were moved to Augsburg during World War II, where most of them have disappeared. What is certain is that in 1740 the canonical visitation of the Buxheim Charterhouse reviewed the financial strength of the community for a new building, since the makeshift structure was found to be "old, unworthy, and too small." The decision to build a new church was not made until ten years later. The decision to build was not taken until ten years later.

=== Today's church ===
For the new building, the substructures and the foundations of the previous building on the eastern slope were used, as well as those of the lower medieval tower storey. Due to the steep slope on the eastern side and the narrowness of the site because of the adjacent courtyards in the western direction, the planners had to abandon the traditional orientation with the much larger building. The church is therefore oriented to the north and is one of the few places of worship that deviate from the orientation to the east. On March 24, 1752, the demolition of the previous building was approved by the vicar general. The costs were borne by the Charterhouse of Buxheim. On April 11, 1752, the foundation stone of the present church was laid. After three years of construction, it was consecrated on October 12, 1755 by auxiliary Bishop Franz Xaver Adelmann von Adelmannsfelden. It exceeds the usual size of a Swabian village church, as the new building was a prestige project of the Catholic Church in Swabia. The architect and plasterer was probably Jakob Jehle from Obenhausen.

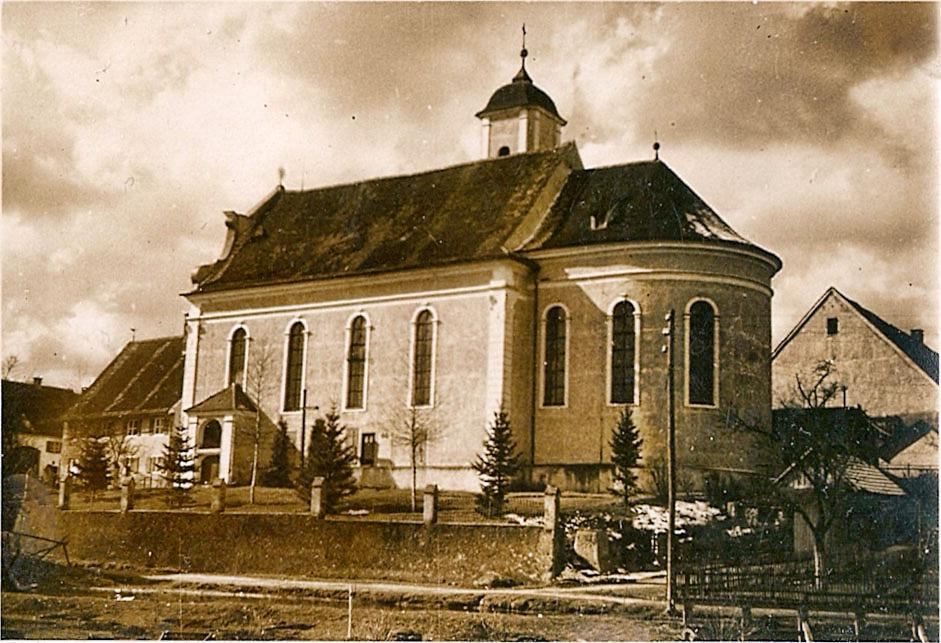
The church seen from the east, around 1935

It is assumed that he based the interior design on the Buxheim parish church, which was decorated by the Zimmermann brothers. The three altars (high altar, Lady altar and Joseph altar) and the pulpit were created under the influence of Gabriel Weiß the Elder from Bad Wurzach and his son of the same name. The sculptors and carvers probably belonged to the circle of Anton Sturm from Füssen and Dominikus Hermengild Herberger, a native of Upper Swabia. The name of the fresco painter has not been handed down. The church was renovated for the first time in the 19th century. In 1922 the room shell and the frescoes were repaired. The large ceiling fresco, which was painted over during the first renovation, was renewed by Josef Albrecht. At about the same time, the door leading from the nave to the tower was bricked up and the entrance from the sacristy to the lower part of the tower was created. In 1949 the altars, the pulpit and the figures received new settings. The last comprehensive restoration took place from 1989 to 1997. During this time, the entire church was renovated and the choir was equipped with a new popular altar by Jörg Maxzin. In 2009, the retaining wall with the staircase, east of the church, had to be renovated at a cost of 135,000 euros, as its stability was no longer guaranteed.

== History of use ==
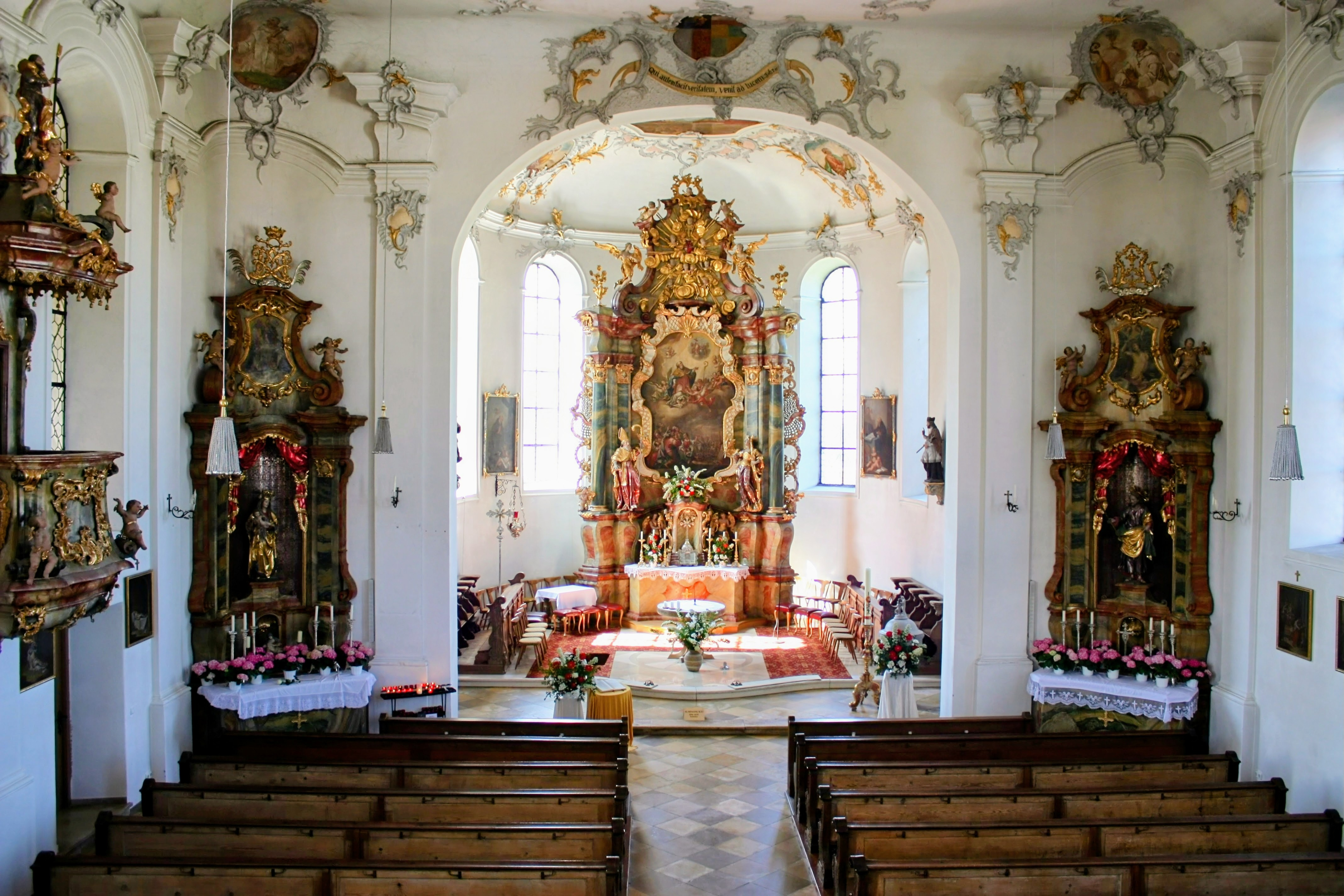
View from the first matroneum into the nave with the choir

The church used to be a place of worship of the Buxheim Charterhouse for the Catholic rural population of Amendingen and the surrounding area. After the secularization of the Charterhouse, it became an independent parish church with branches in Eisenburg and Trunkelsberg. Today the parish belongs to the Catholic deanery of Memmingen in the diocese of Augsburg. Roman Catholic services are usually celebrated every Sunday and on Catholic holidays and high feasts. Rosary prayers are also held regularly. Protestant services, which used to be held in the church as well, are no longer celebrated there since the completion of the so-called Amendinger Schlössle.

== Building description ==
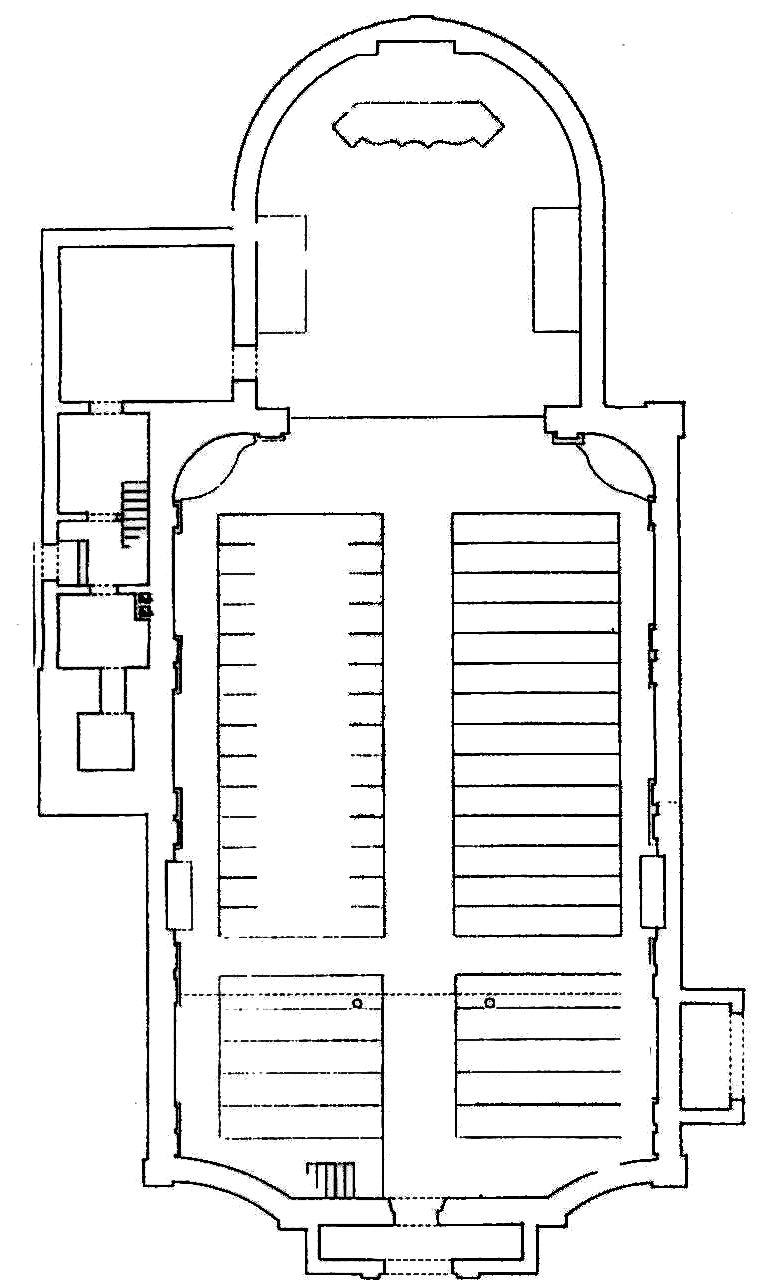
Ground plan of St. Ulrich

The church of St. Ulrich is a standardized aisleless church. The rectangular nave extends over four window axes and is 20 meters long, ten meters high and 13 meters wide inside. The windows in the nave are round-arched. The adjoining choir has two window axes and a semicircular end. It is eleven meters high, nine meters wide and twelve meters long inside. To the west of the chancel is the two-story sacristy, and to the west of the nave is the tower, which is about 30 meters high. An annex stands to the east of the nave.

The southern facade is divided by four pilasters, the flanks are curved back concavely. Three large windows are set into the main floor, with ornamental curved oeil-de-boeuf below them on the sides. In front of the portal is added a portico with a curved ornamental gable and a stitch-arched entrance lined with pilasters. Above it there is a fresco of St. Ulrich. Above the portico there is a sandstone coat of arms of the Buxheim Charterhouse on the facade.

The gable of the south facade stands out with a strong profiled cornice that continues around the nave and the chancel. It has a large window in the center and small unadorned oeil-de-boeuf on the sides. On the sides it is flanked by volutes. The flat gable top bears a sundial and, as a crown, a golden eye of Providence with a halo of rays.

The church tower is located to the west of the nave. The upper floor stands out from the rest with a cornice and is articulated on all sides by pilasters. The round-arched window openings of the belfry are closed with boarded shutters. The fully electric church clock on the south side was made by Philipp Hölz from Ulm. The curved spire is covered with sheet metal and is crowned by a golden sphere and a golden cross.

In the eastern annex is an olivet scene with wooden figures from 1755, below which are wooden statues of three poor souls in purgatory.

The sacristy is in the basement with a simple stucco frame. The room in the gable has a window opening with an iron grille hand-forged in 1755 to the choir and is called Chörlein.

In the interior, on the south side, there are two matronea, the upper of which is used as an organ loft. The first gallery is built in at a height of three meters, the second is located 2.7 meters above the first and is set back on the left and right, strongly curved forward in the middle. Under the gallery is the portal of the church, whose wings are decorated with curved filling frames.

=== Altars ===
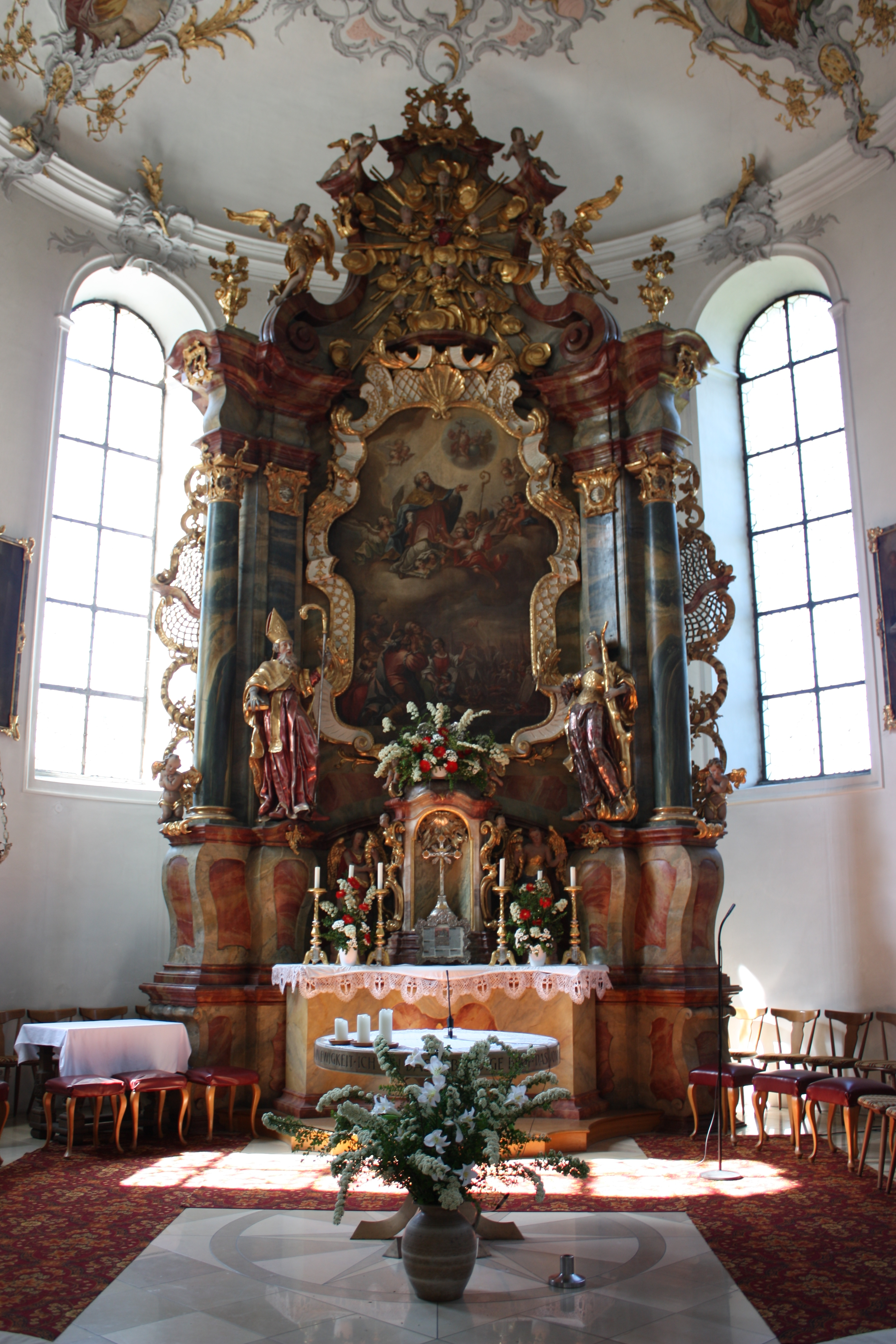
High altar

There are three altars in the church, all of which were built around 1754. The high altar stands on the north side of the chancel. The side altars, dedicated to Our Lady on the left and St. Joseph on the right, stand on the north walls of the nave. They are simple altarpieces with an indentation for statues and excerpt images.

==== High altar ====
The high altar dedicated to St. Ulrich has two columns and is decorated with figures. It was probably designed by Gabriel Weiß the Elder and erected in 1754. The altarpiece shows an intercession of St. Ulrich to the Holy Trinity to save the people at his feet from the invading Hungarians. It refers to the battle of Lechfeld in 955.

The elaborately carved frames of the high altar painting are decorated with Rococo ornaments, as are the two openwork decorations on the sides. They are attributed to the sculptor Anton Sturm. The side figures represent St. Narcissus and the Augsburg diocesan patron saint, St. Afra. This was intended to symbolize the close relationship with the episcopal city of Augsburg.

==== Lady altar ====
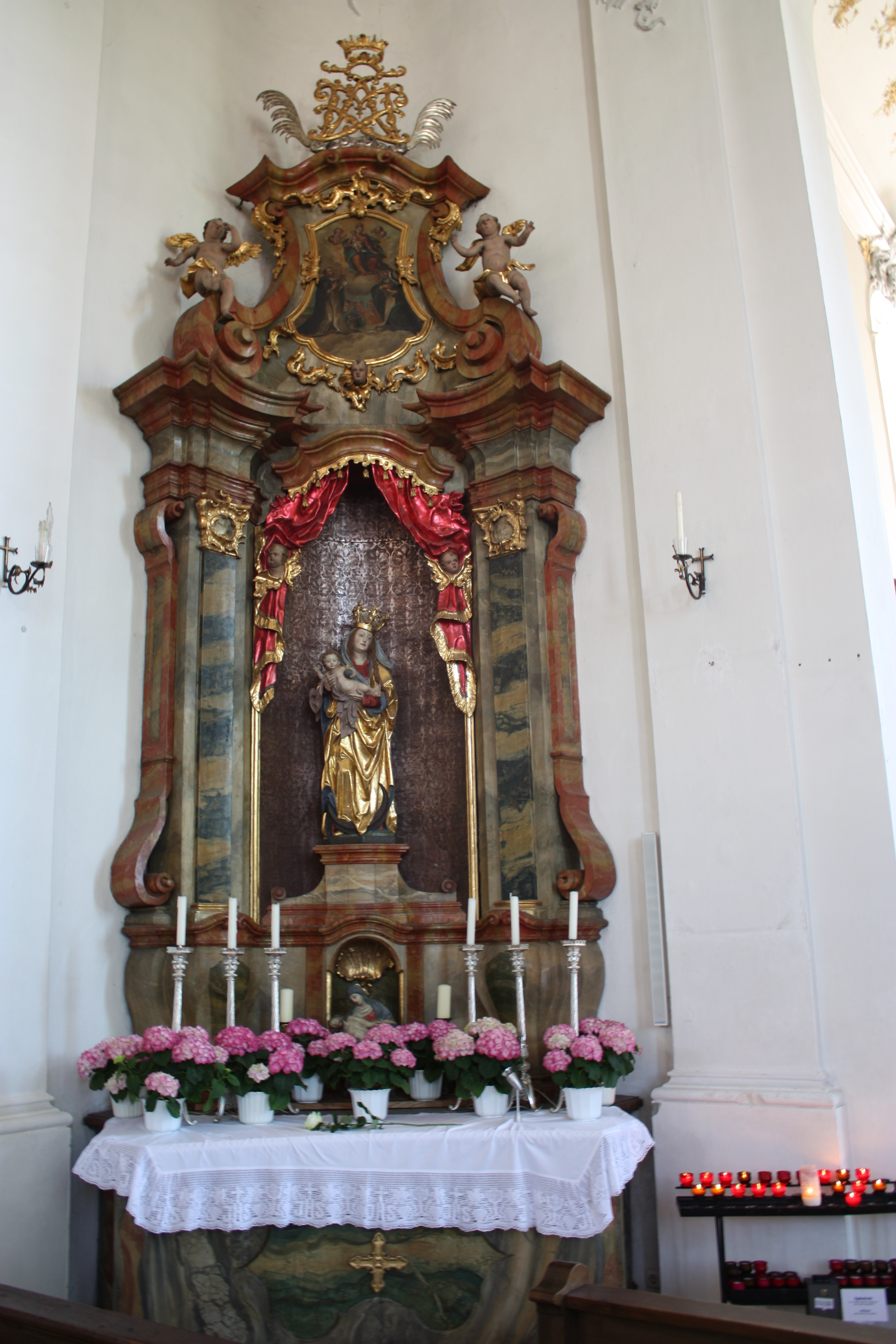
Lady altar with the Woman of the Apocalypse

The Lady altar has a valuable carved late Gothic Woman of the Apocalypse from the workshop of the artist Ivo Strigel in the carved bulge decorated with putti heads.

=== Pulpit ===
The bell lid of the pulpit has as a crowning Christ in the form of the good shepherd with a lamb on his shoulders. It is attributed to the circle of the artist Dominikus Hermengild Herberger and was made around 1755.

=== Frescoes ===
The church is richly decorated with frescoes. The largest, the ceiling fresco of the nave, was painted by Josef Albrecht in 1923. It depicts the canonization of Bishop Ulrich of Augsburg at the Lateran Council in 993 by Pope John XV.

==== Choir frescoes ====
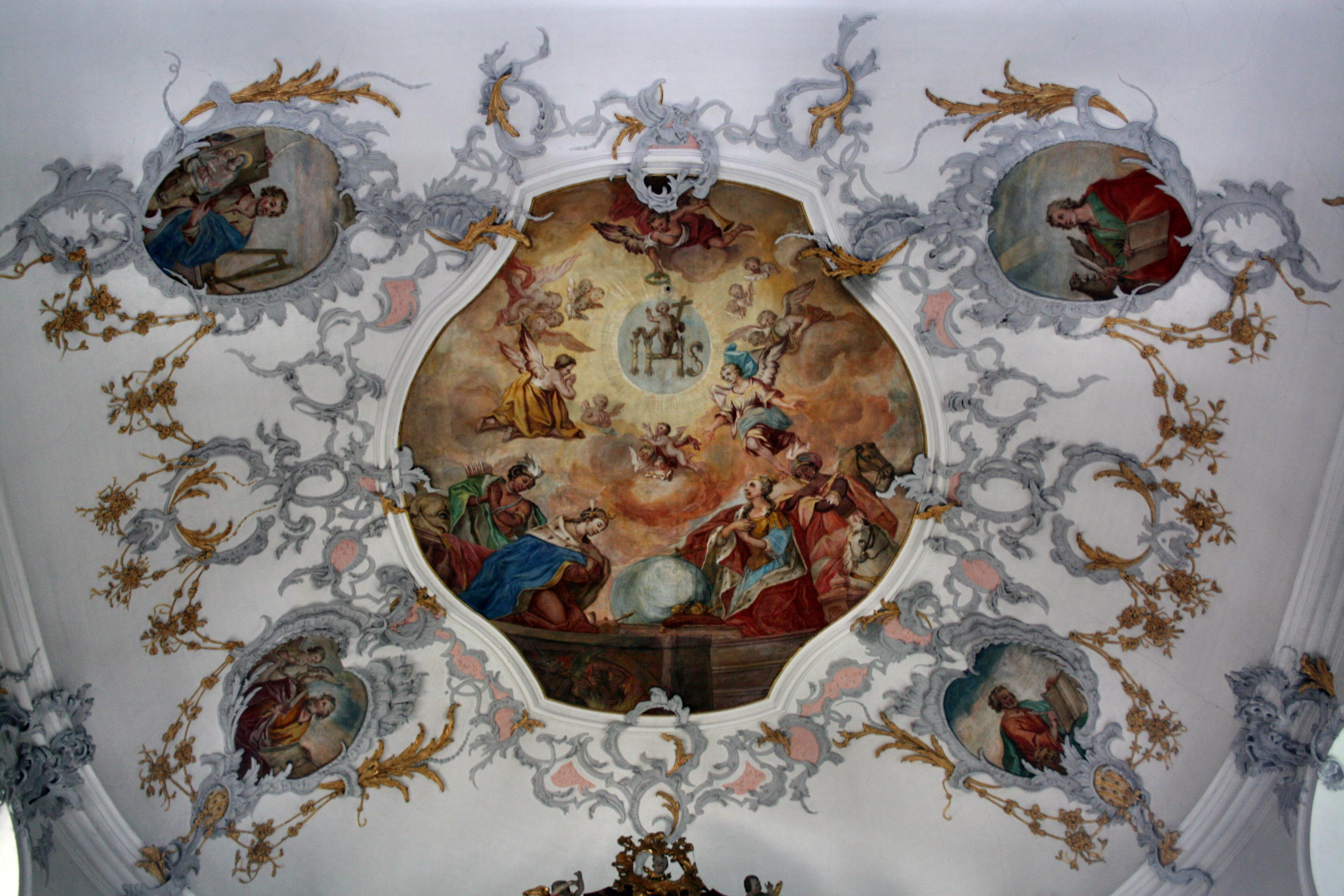
Choir frescoes

The choir frescoes are painted in Baroque colors. The ceiling fresco of the choir room shows the worship of the name of Jesus by the four continents on a staircase above the Devil's Pool.

At the four corners of the ceiling fresco there are oval frescoes with the evangelists: At the bottom left Matthew with the winged man, at the top left Luke with an easel and the bull, at the bottom right Mark with the lion and at the top John with the eagle.

==== Nave frescoes ====
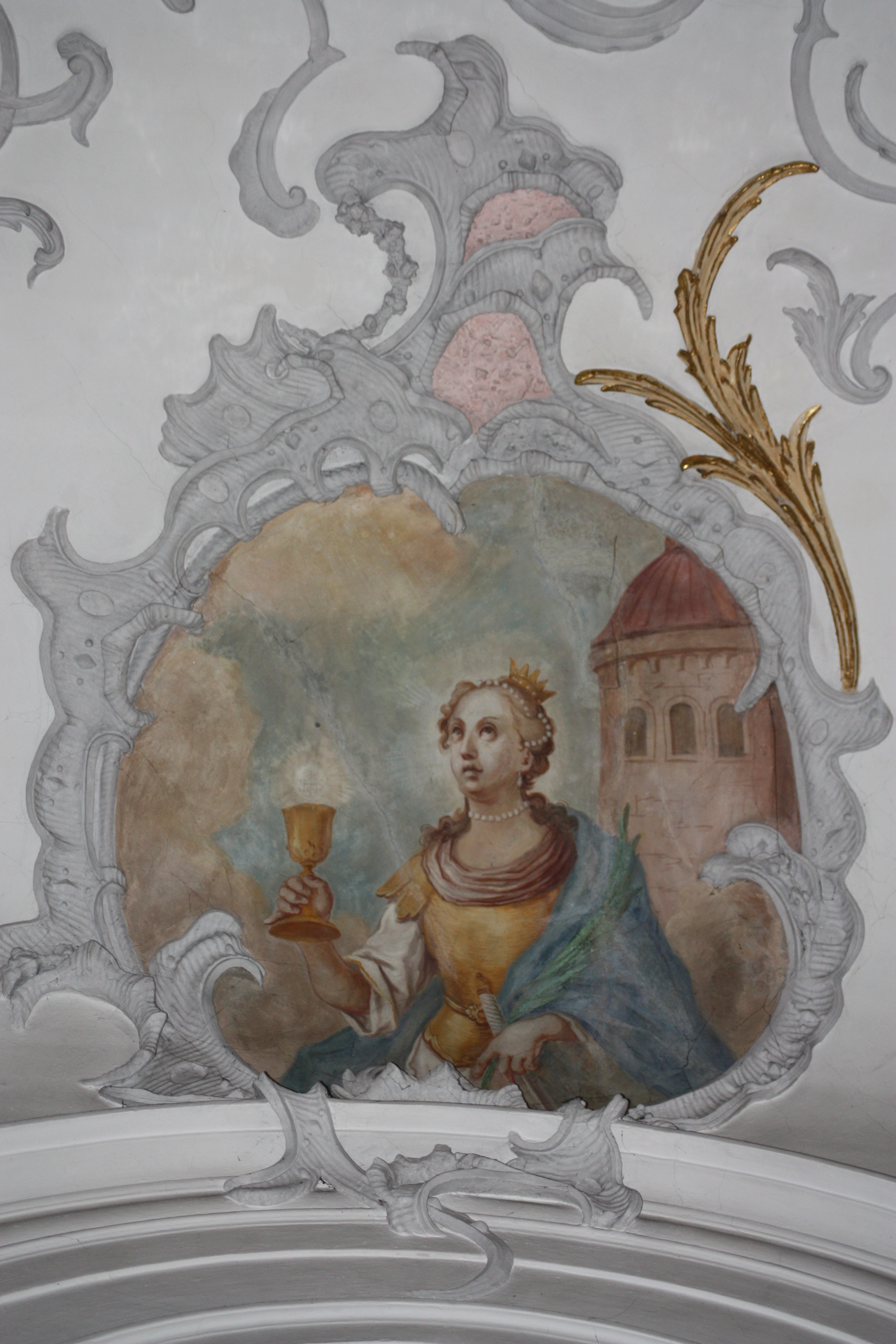
St. Barbara with chalice and tower and sword

In the nave, only the medallions with biblical figures and their attributes on the vaulted church wall have been preserved from the Baroque fresco decoration from the time of construction. In the corners are painted the four Latin Fathers of the Church: Pope Gregory the Great with tiara and crozier, St. Jerome with trumpets announcing the Last Judgment, St. Augustine with flaming heart and St. Ambrose with mitre and beehive. The main fresco of the nave was created in 1923 by Josef Albrecht from Munich. It shows the canonization of Bishop Ulrich of Augsburg at the Lateran Council in 993 by Pope John XV, who is seated on the throne below a triumphal arch. The saint is carried to heaven by angels on a cloud above this scene. Ulrich is depicted wearing a white robe, golden mantle, miter, crozier and halo with a halo of rays. An angel hovers above a triangle with the eye of God. On the organ loft, St. Cecilia is depicted playing the organ, painted in 1922 by an artist from the Haugg company.

=== Other features ===
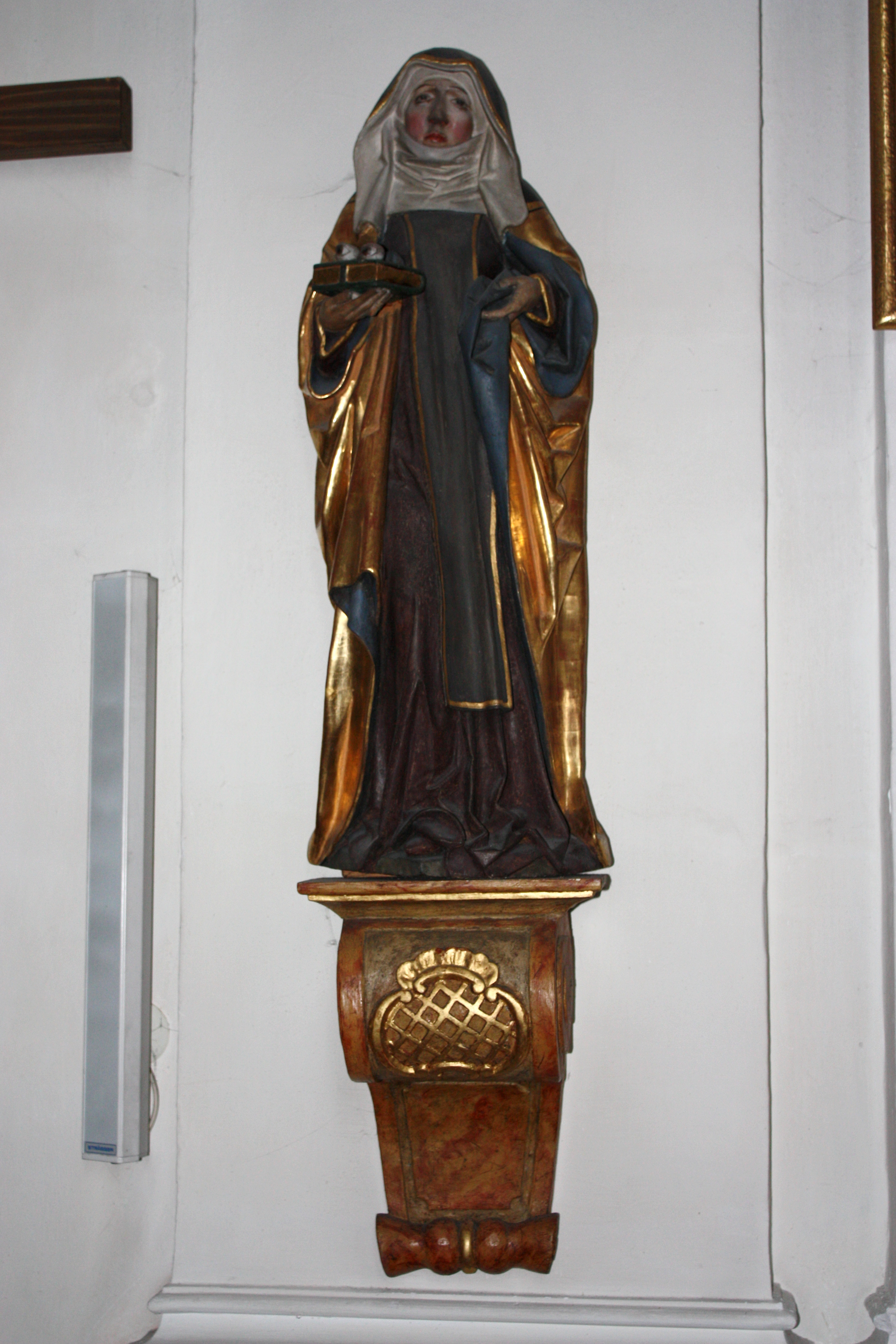
St. Ottilie, created around 1500.

A Stations of the Cross with oil paintings from the second half of the 18th century is mounted on the walls around the nave. The paintings, attributed to Konrad Huber from Weißenhorn, are crowned with small golden crosses.

Ignaz Waibel created the sculpture of the Good Shepherd around 1700, which is placed in the choir room opposite the 18th century figure of St. Nepomuk. In the rear part of the nave, on one side, there is a sculpture of St. Odile, made around 1500, which used to be in the small Gothic chapel of St. Ottilie on the outskirts of the village, and on the other, a statue of St. Anthony of Padua.

On the right side of the nave stands a carved crucifixion scene with Mary and Veronica made around 1730. It came to the church in 1944; where it was before and who created it is not known. The 17th-century baptismal font with bell-shaped basin is considered a masterpiece, crowned by a small late 18th-century Christ and John group carved in Tilia. The hand-forged grille on the parapet of the chancel oratory, decorated with foliate tendril, and the twelve apostle candlesticks decorated with foliate tendril from 1755 are also works of art of a high order.

=== Organ ===
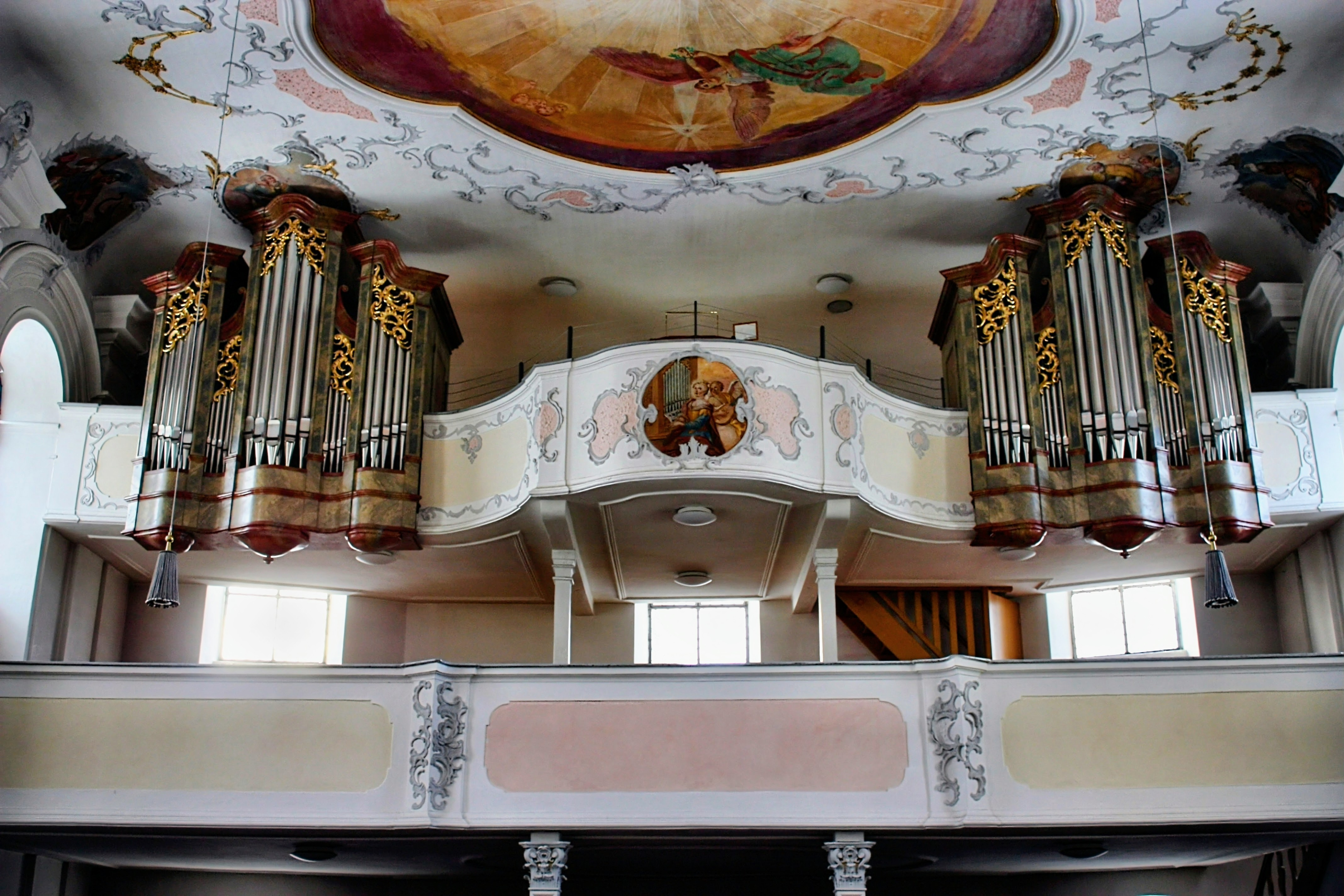
The organ

The first organ in St. Ulrich was probably built in 1860 or 1882. The still existing church documents give contradictory information about this. It is certain that it was made by the Memmingen organ building company Behler at a price of 2500 marks. It was replaced in 1953 by an instrument of the organ building company Gebrüder Hindelang from Ebenhofen. This organ had two manuals with 19 organ stops and 1244 organ pipes. The organ prospect was designed by government architect Willi Hornung-Ottobeuren and cost about 20,000 marks.

The present organ was built in 1997.

=== Bells ===
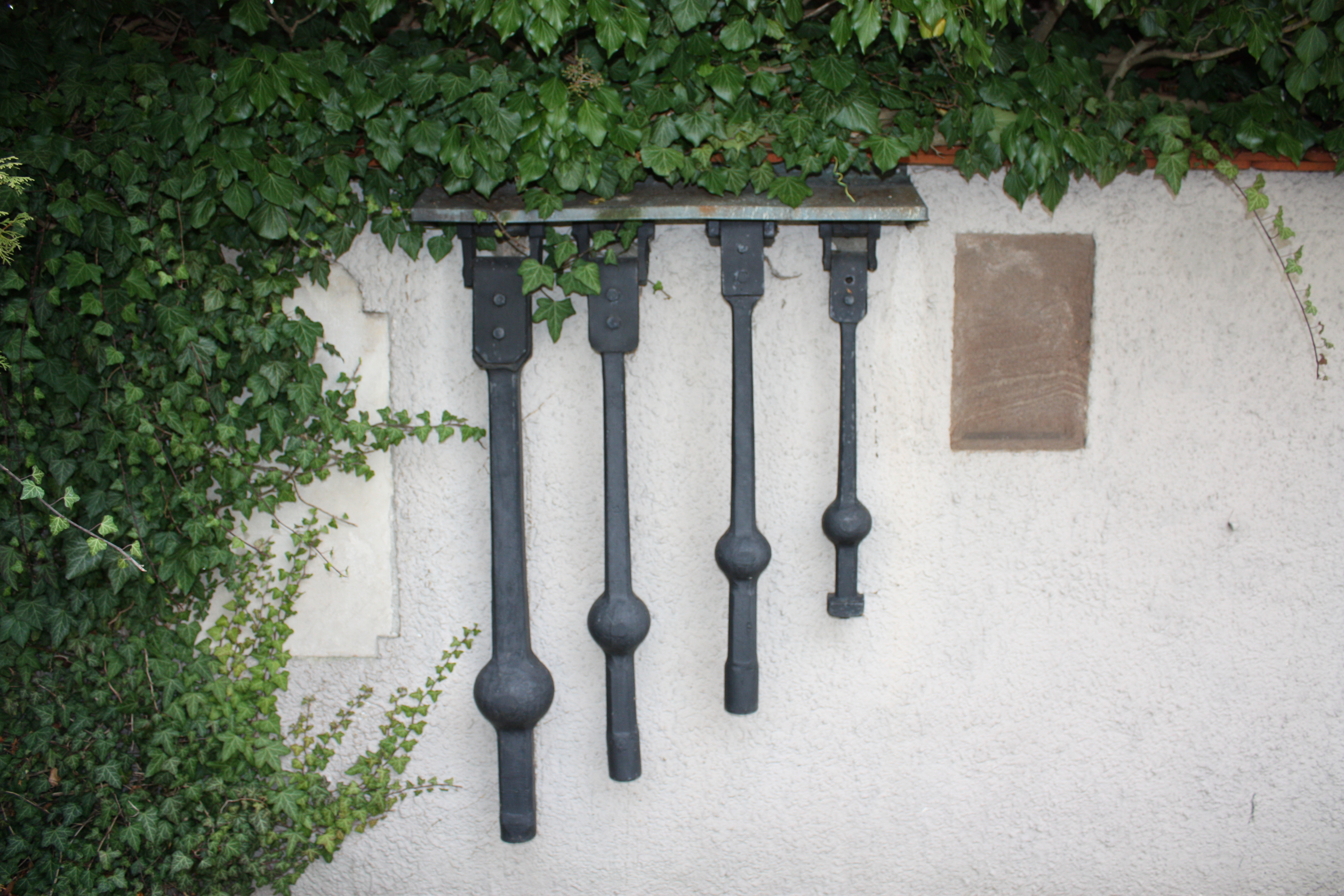
The clapper of the old bells from 1922 on the churchyard wall

It is not known when the first bells were hung in the church tower. A bell consecration took place on August 5, 1900. During the World War I these bells had to be delivered for armament purposes in 1916. On July 2, 1922 the consecration of the bells cast by the company Georg Wolfart from Lauingen took place. They cost 243,328 marks:

| Name | Tone | Weight | Text |
|---|---|---|---|
| 1. Bell | es | 1124 kg | durch die Männer |
| 2. Bell | g | 538 kg | durch die Jünglinge |
| 3. Bell | b | 343 kg | durch die Jungfrauen/Frauen |
| 4. Bell | c | 254 kg | durch die Kinder |

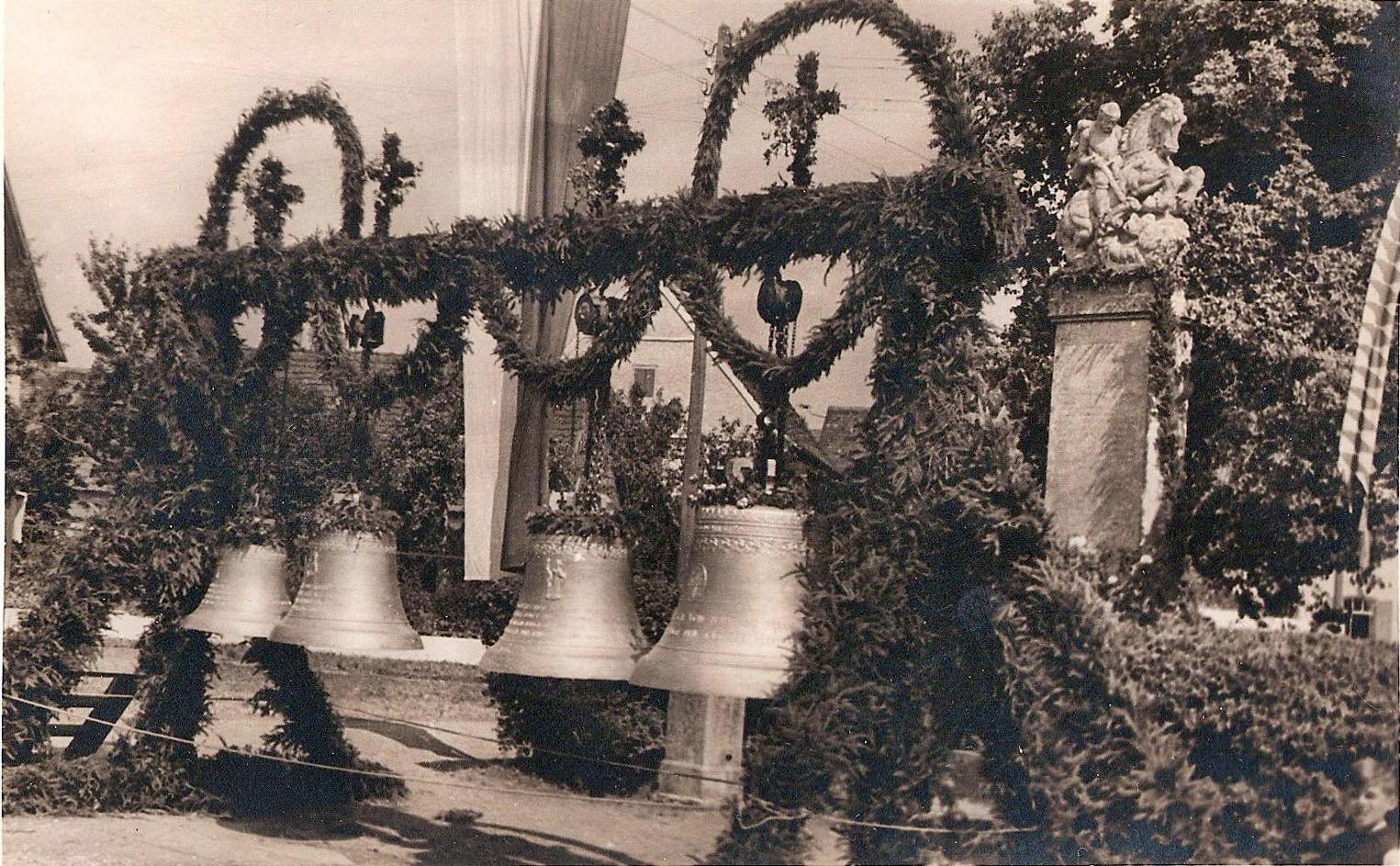
The consecration of the bells in 1949

These bells had to be delivered again during the World War II and were melted down. Only the four clappers have been preserved and remind us of the ringing on the west side of the churchyard wall. In 1949, four new bells from the company Engelbert Gebhard from Kempten were consecrated by the Abbot Vitalis Maier from Ottobeuren:

| Name | Picture | Ton | Text |
|---|---|---|---|
| Hosanna | | e | HOSANNA LÄUT ICH. VON NAH U. FERN KOMMT U. HEILIGT DEN TAG DES HERRN MEISTER GEBHART GOSS IN KEMPTEN UNS VIER SEIT 1949 HÄNGEN WIR HIER |
| St. Ulrich's bell | | g | IN GOTTES HULD IST ALLES GELEGEN. ST. ULRICH ERBITT UNS DES HIMMELS SEGEN! MEIN LÄUTEN BRINGE DEN FRIEDEN DES HERRN. HALT WETTER UND KRIEG VON DER HEIMAT FERN. |
| Aveglock | | b | MARIA D. MUTTER D. HERRN GEWEIHT RUF ZUM GEBET ICH ALLEZEIT FALT FROMM DIE HÄNDE UNTERDESS KOMM AUCH AM WERKTAG ZUR HL. MESS. |
| Seelenglöcklein | | c | GEFSTIFTET 1922 V. STETTER-DIRR. NEUGEGOSSEN 1949 ALS TAUF- U. TOTENGLOCKE GESTELLT – MAHNE ICH DIE VERGESSLICHE WELT. AUF ERDEN WÄHRT ALLES NUR KURZE ZEIT. O MENSCH, DENK AN DIE EWIGKEIT! |

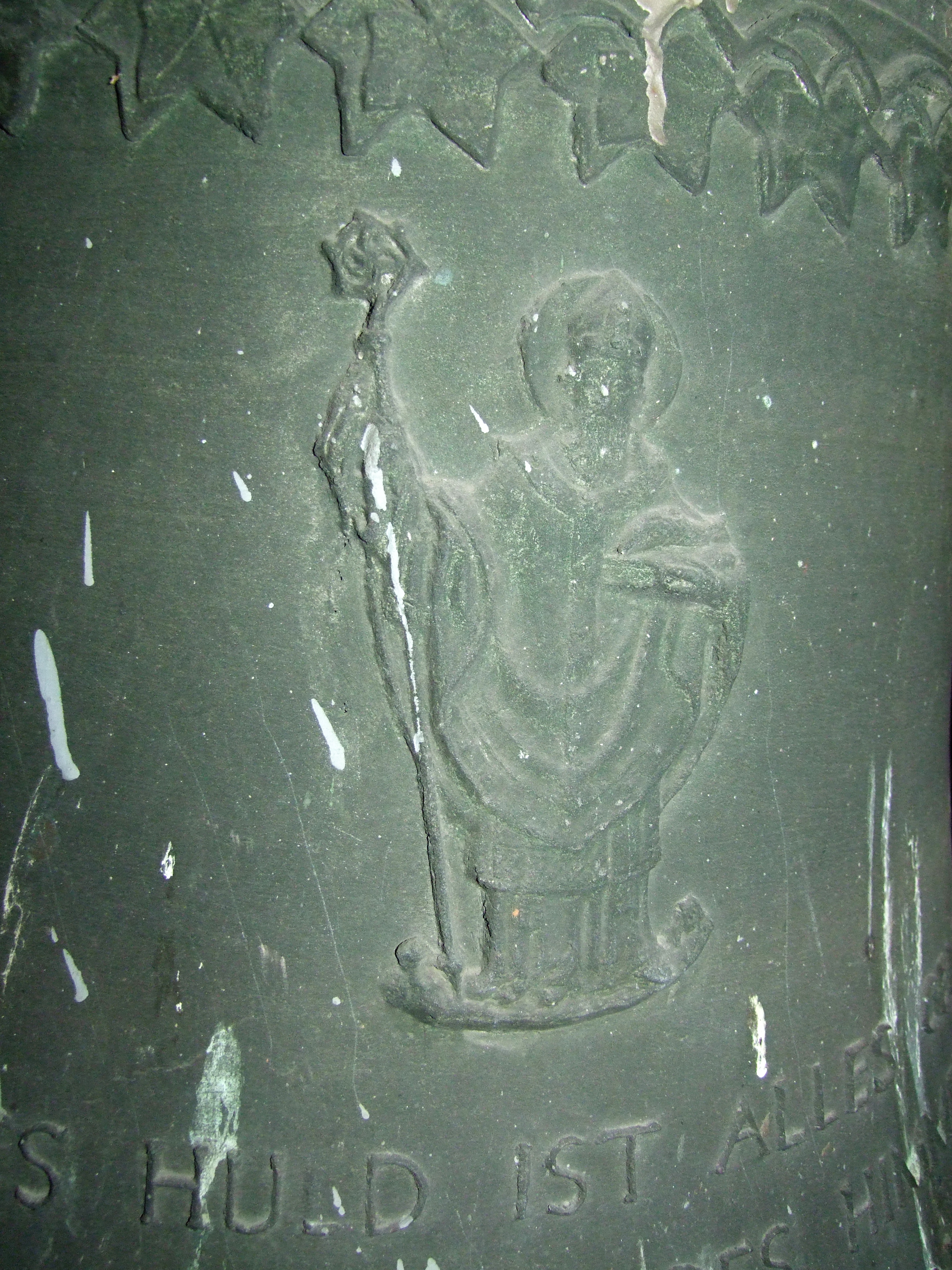
The patron saint of the church St. Ulrich on the Ulrich bell

== Cemetery ==
The deceased were traditionally buried around the church. In 1870 the community decided to build a new cemetery north of the church on a meadow donated by the owner of the adjacent farm. It was only after the First World War that the last graves at the church disappeared. Some epitaphs embedded in the western churchyard wall remind of the former graveyard. A war memorial was erected between them.

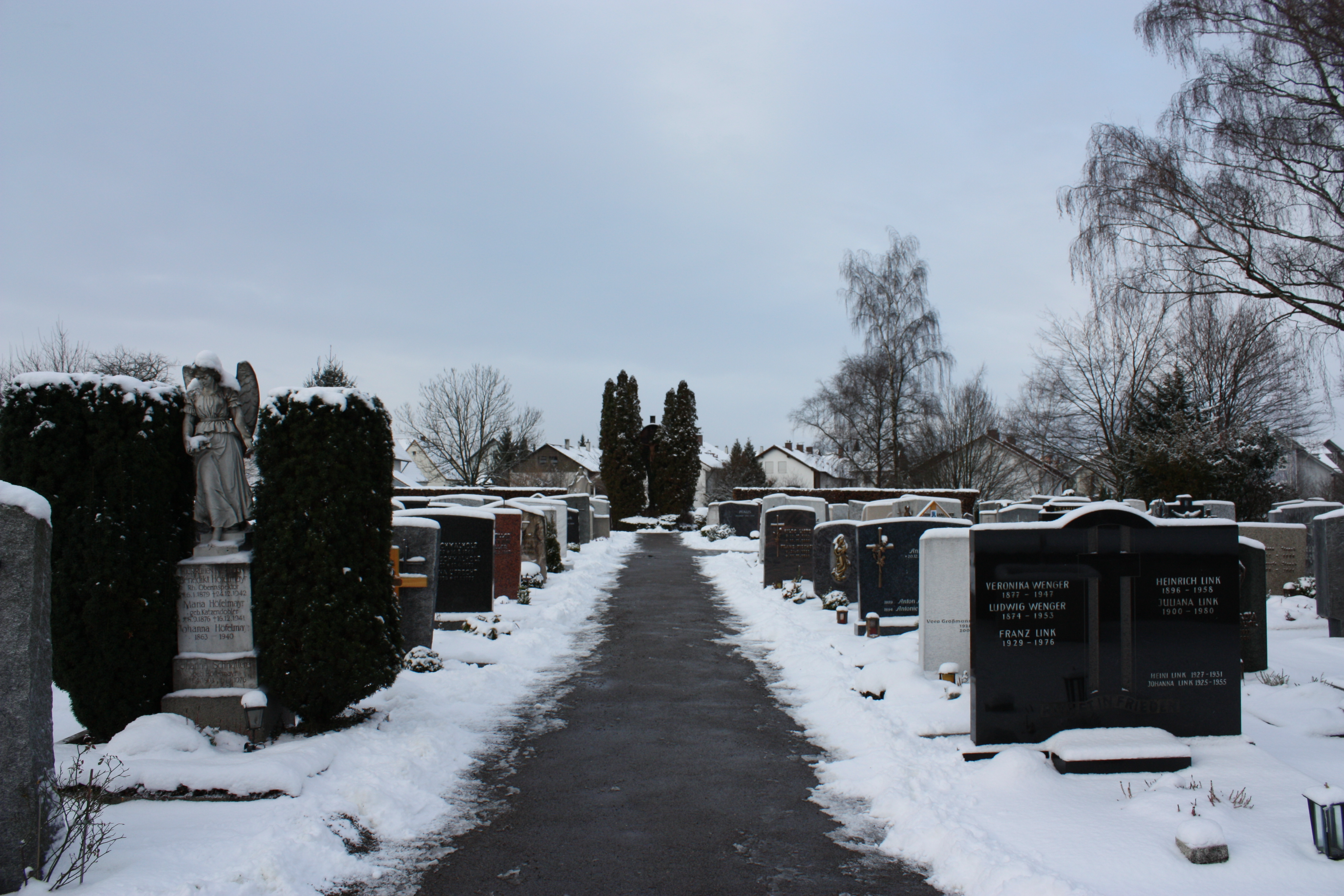
View of the cemetery north of the church

The still existing old mortuary was built in 1922. The first expansion of the new cemetery took place in 1954 and was completed on All Saints' Day 1955 with the consecration of the large cross in the center. Since the old mortuary had become too small for the rapidly growing town, plans for a new funeral home began in the early 1970s. Due to the incorporation of Amendingen into Memmingen, the project was put on hold. It was not until 1977, after long negotiations with the city of Memmingen, that the new mortuary was built on the cemetery at a cost of 300,000 German marks and inaugurated on February 19, 1978. The money was donated by the Amendingen land consolidation cooperative.

== Bibliography ==
- Carmen Röll (2000), Katholisches Pfarramt St. Ulrich Memmingen-Amendingen (ed.), Kath. Pfarrkirche St. Ulrich in Amendingen, Memmingen
- Tilmann Breuer (1959), Stadt und Landkreis Memmingen, München: Deutscher Kunstverlag, pp. 61–68
- Stefan Binzer (1957), Amendingen in Vergangenheit und Gegenwart – Eine kurzgefasste Ortsgeschichte., Amendingen
- Stefan Binzer (1964), Amendinger Chronik (Geschichte Amendingens – Über 30 Jahre in Krieg und Frieden – Vom Ersten Weltkrieg bis 1964)
- Ludwig Mayr (1918), Die Herrschaft Eisenburg, Steinbach
