= Sturm =

Sturm (German for storm) may refer to:

== People ==
- Sturm (surname), surname (includes a list)
- Saint Sturm (c. 705–779), 8th-century monk

== Food ==
- Federweisser, known as Sturm in Austria, wine in the fermentation stage
- Sturm Foods, an American dry grocery manufacturer

== Arts and media ==
- Der Sturm, early 20th-century German magazine covering the Expressionism movement
- Der Sturm, German title of Shakespeare's play The Tempest
- Sturm (novella), a 1923 novella by Ernst Jünger
- Sturm, an album by The Notwist

== Fictional characters ==
- Sturm, in the Advance Wars video games
- Sturm, in The Books of Faerie series by Vertigo Comics
- Sturm Brightblade, in the Dragonlance series

== Other uses ==
- SK Sturm Graz, a football team based in Graz in Austria

== See also ==
- Sturm Brightblade, a fictional character in the Dragonlance campaign setting
- Sturm College of Law, the law school at the University of Denver
- Sturm–Liouville theory, a mathematical theory concerning the solutions of certain differential equations
- Sturm, Ruger & Co., a firearms manufacturer
- Sturm series, associated with polynomials
- Sturm's theorem, a method for counting the number of distinct real roots of a polynomial
- Sturm und Drang, a period of cultural revival in Germany during the 18th century
