= Anton Sturm =

Tyrolean sculptor (1690–1757)

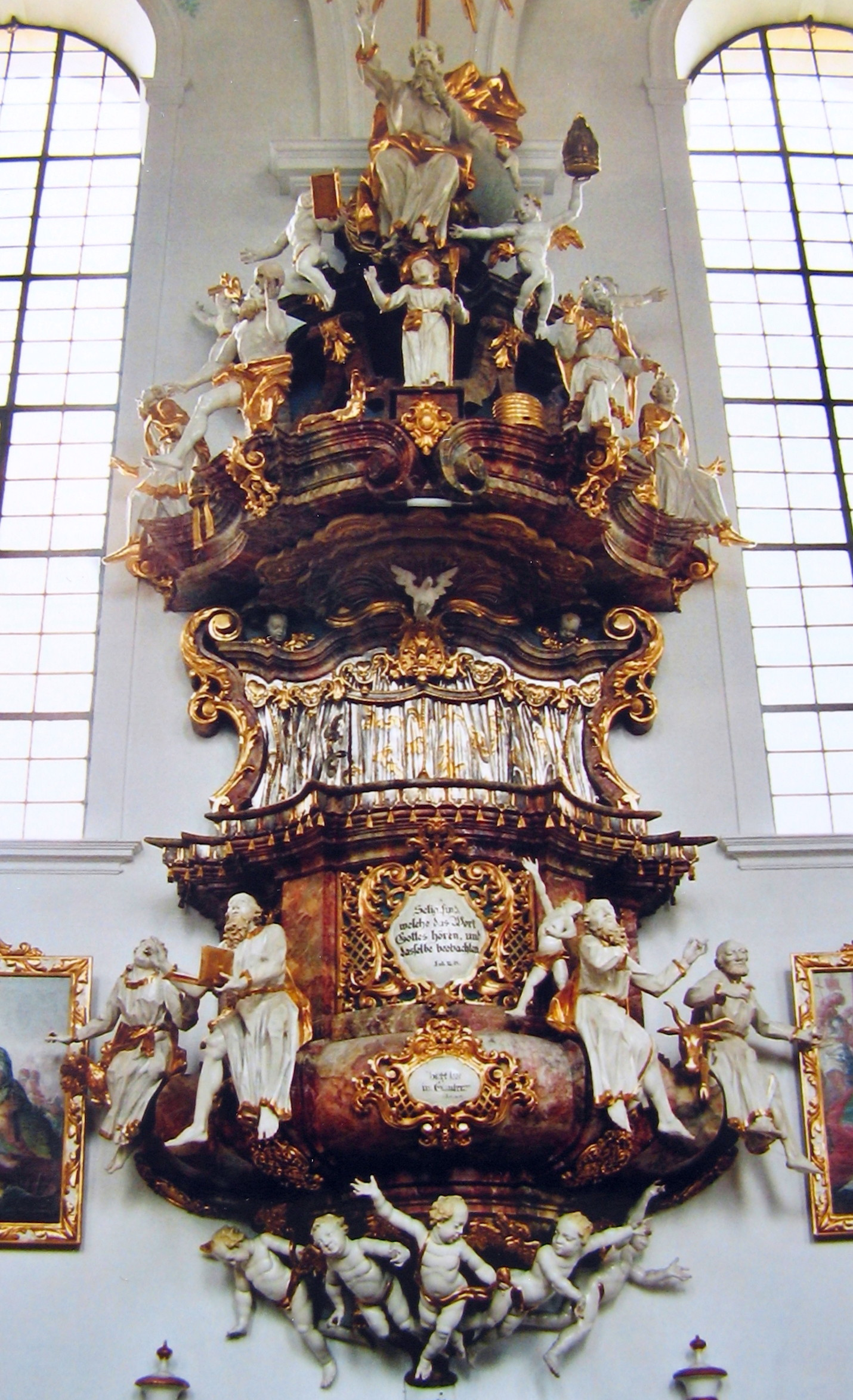
Pulpit in the parish church of Bernbeuren

Anton Sturm (30 May 1690 - 25 October 1757) was a Tyrolean sculptor who worked in the Baroque and Rococo styles. His works are primarily located in the Allgäu region and the adjacent parts of Upper Bavaria.

== Life ==
Sturm was born Faggen. According to local records, from 1705 to 1709 he was apprenticed to a peasant sculptor named Johann Paul Tschiderer in Donauwörth. There is no record of his journeyman years, although it appears certain that he did some work at St. Mang's Abbey. In 1721, he married Maria Fellner from Boos, bought a house and set up a workshop just nine days later. He frequently took apprentices (including his own son, Franz Joseph) and employed journeymen, most of whose names have not been recorded. He was held in high esteem and served in several honorary civic positions.

He died in Füssen at the age of 67. His wife died one year later and his workshop was closed shortly thereafter. In 1994, the local school was named the Anton-Sturm-Volksschule in his honor. It became a Mittelschule in 2010.

His figures may often be distinguished by a distinctive bend in the hip, or beards that are styled in "rolls". Most of his works are done in wood, but look as if they were made of marble. He was equally at home in popular and formal presentations. Apparently, there were times when he had trouble obtaining (or keeping) commissions because he was considered to be too expensive.

== Selected works ==
Many works have been attributed to Sturm on the basis of style and location. The following are known to be his. A longer list that includes the attributed works may be found in the corresponding article on German Wikipedia.

- 1720/1721: Schwangau, Parish church of St. Maria und Florian; Altar and pulpit figures.
- 1724/1727: Ottobeuren, Ottobeuren Abbey, Kaisersaal, 16 statues of German Emperors.
- 1731/1733: Bernbeuren, Parish church of St. Nikolaus, Altar figures.
- 1734/1735: Burggen, Pilgrimage church of St. Anna; Altar figures.
- 1738: Ehingen, Parish church of St. Peter and Paul; Kerkerchristus (Christ in the Dungeon).
- 1738/1739: Buxheim, former Carthusian monastery. Liebfrauenkapelle (Our Lady Chapel) and Annakapelle; Altar figures.
- 1739/1741: Oberstdorf, Santa Maria di Loreto Chapel, Altar.
- 1743/1748: Rottenbuch, former Augustinian Monastery; Grave monument for the Provost Patritius Oswald (in marble).
- 1745/1748: Sonthofen, Parish church of St. Peter und Paul; Pulpit and side altar figures.
- 1752: Bad Waldsee, the Count of Waldburg-Wolfegg-Waldsee’s castle; Monumental figure of Maria Immaculata (in marble)
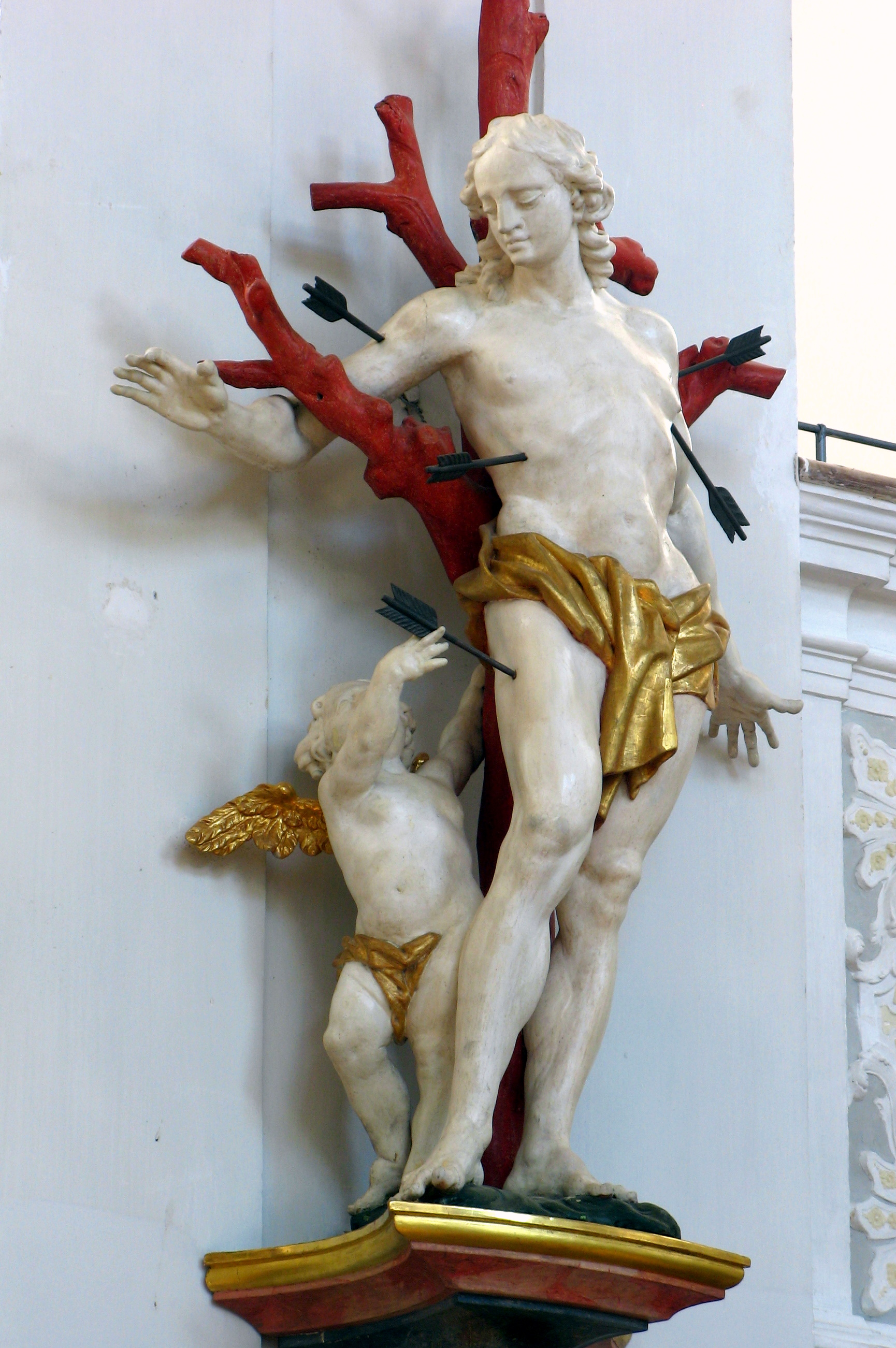
St. Sebastian in the parish church at Wolfegg

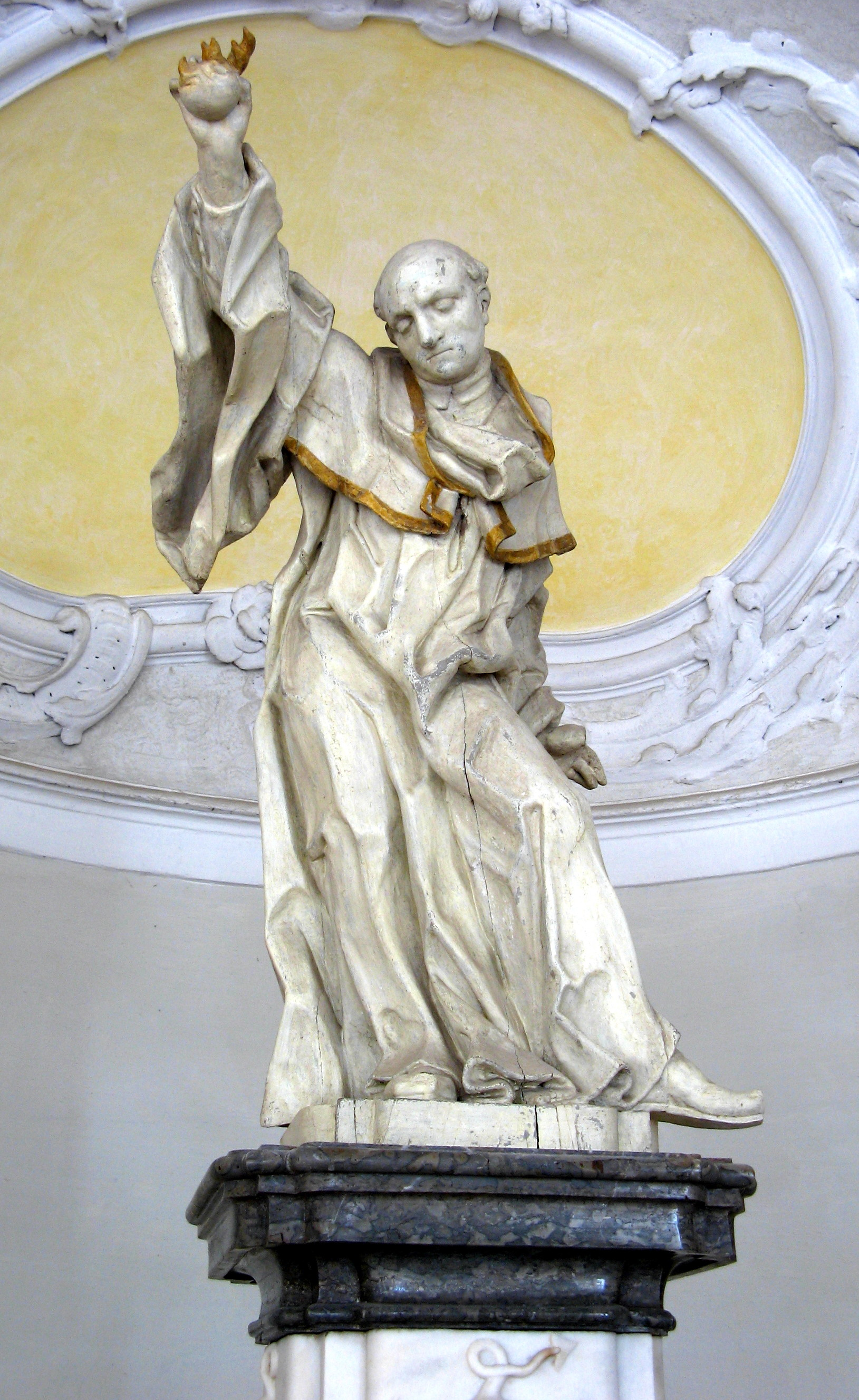
St. Magnus in Saint Mang's Abbey

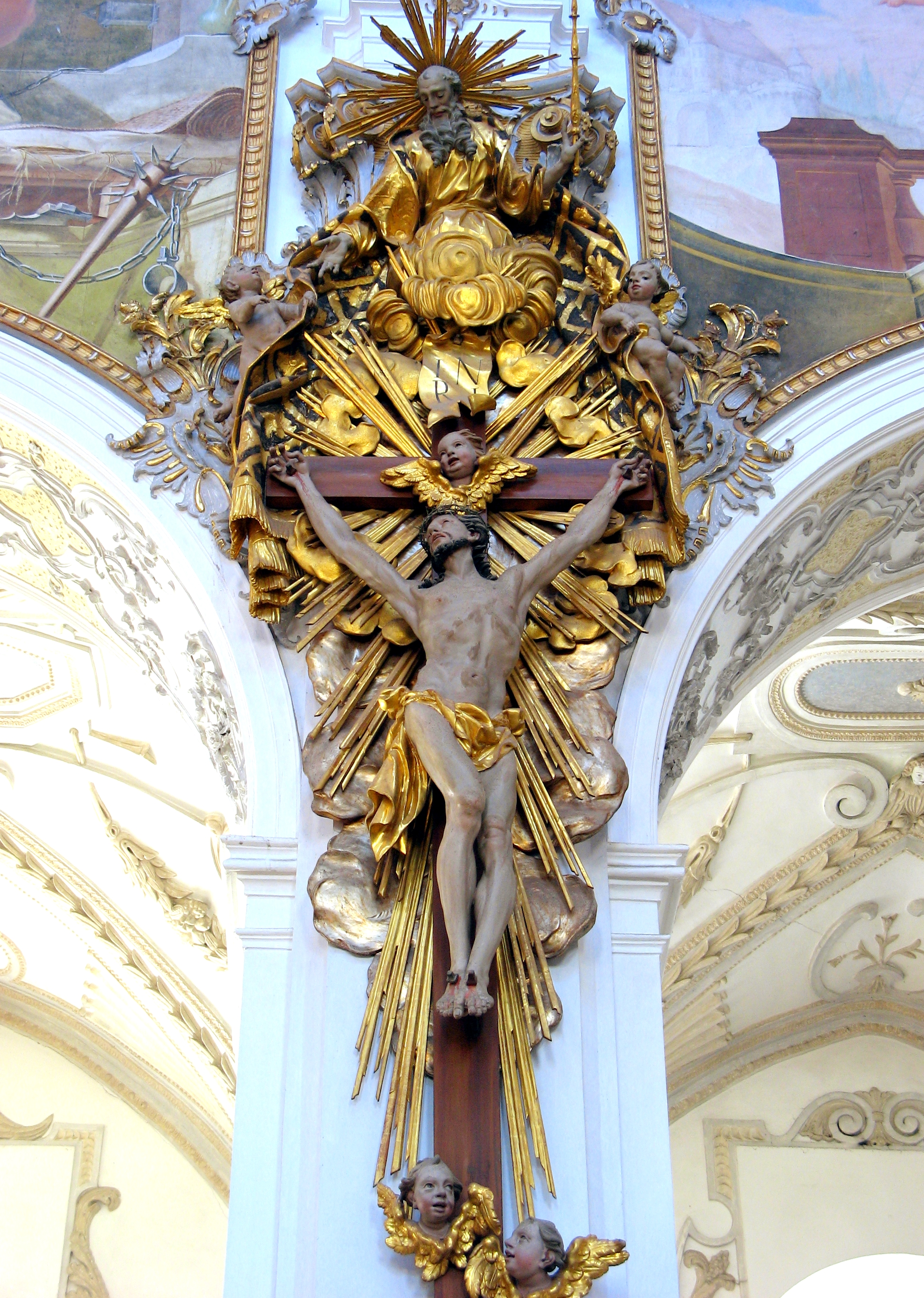
Mercy seat in the parish church at Steingaden

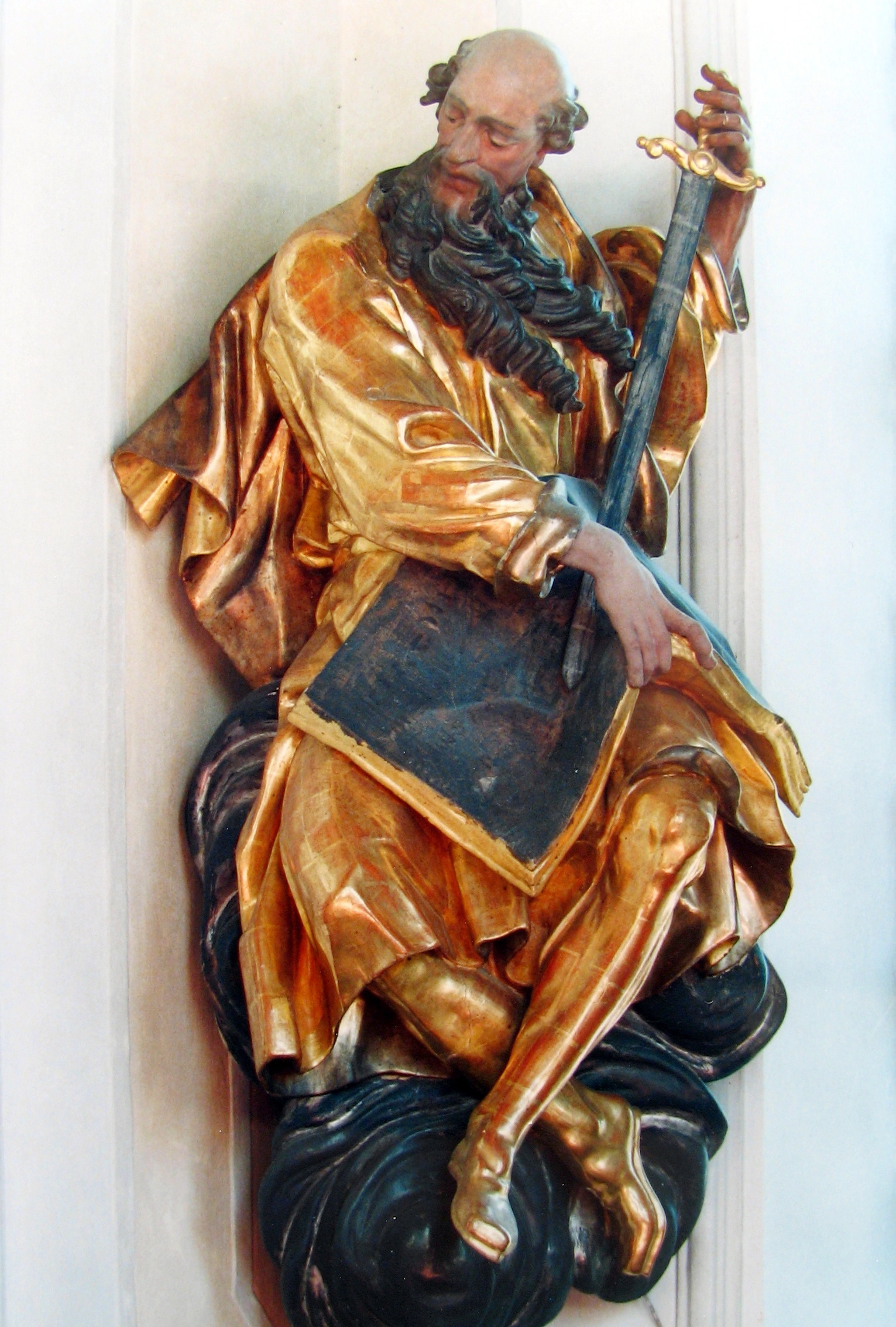
St. Paul in the parish church at Sonthofen

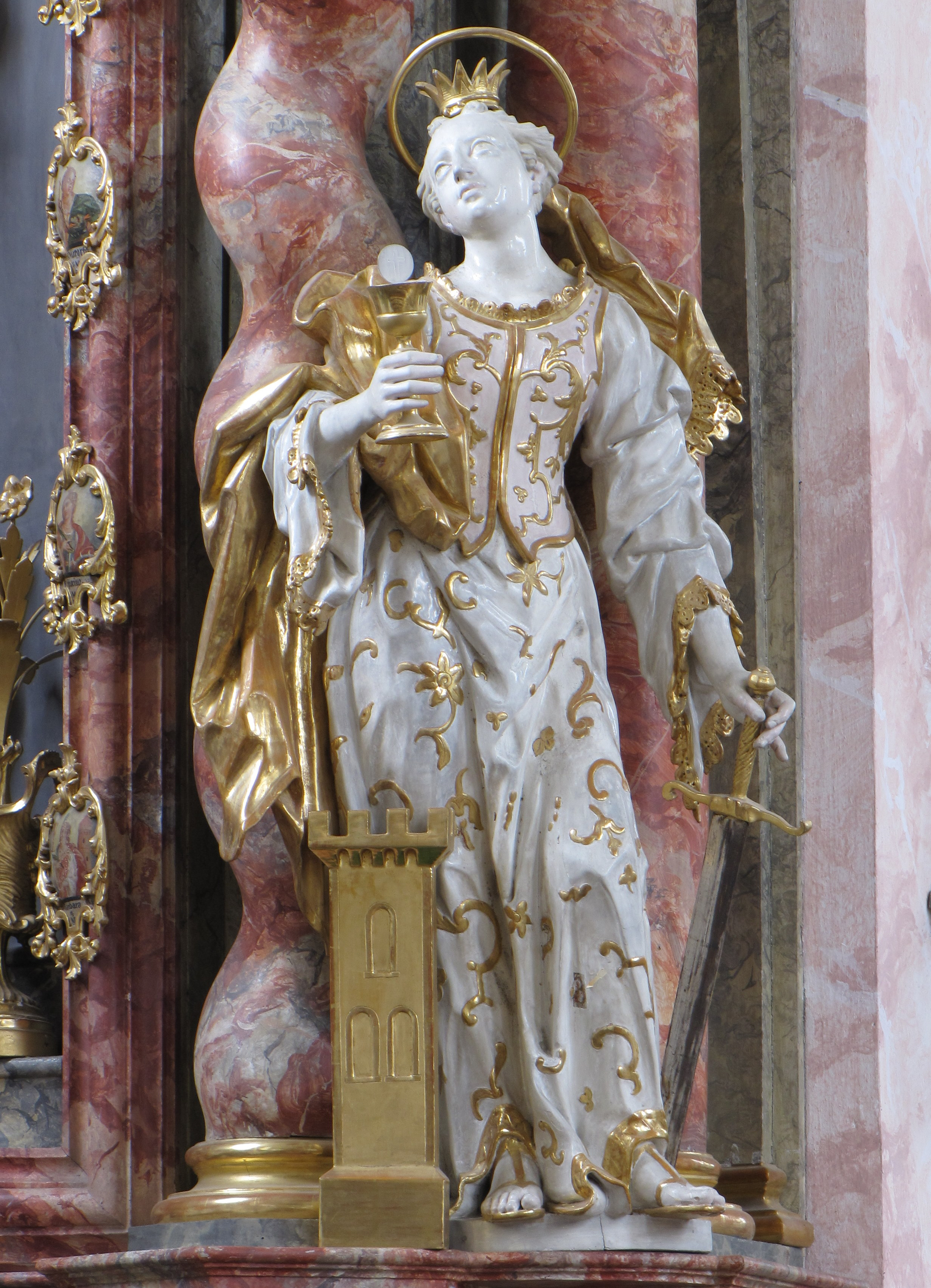
St. Barbara in the parish church at Bernbeuren
