= Lemuel Diggs =

American pathologist (1900–1995)

Lemuel Whitley Diggs
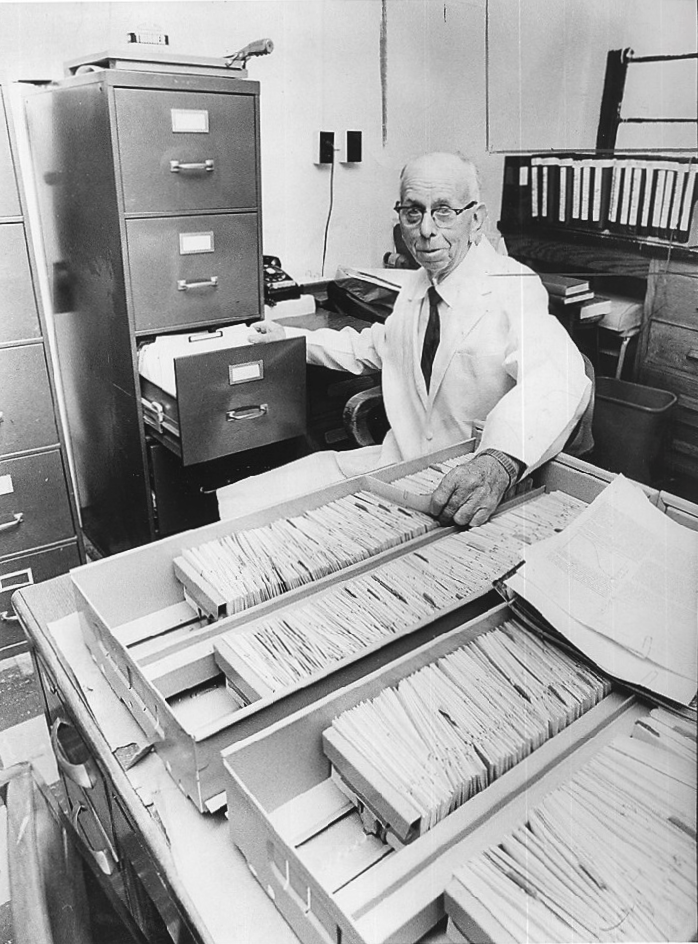
- Diggs with his database of thousands of sickle cell patients on index cards, 1950s
- Born: January 8, 1900; Hampton, Virginia
- Died: January 8, 1995 (aged 95); Memphis, Tennessee
- Education: Randolph-Macon College; Johns Hopkins University School of Medicine
- Known for: Sickle cell anemia
- Scientific career
- Fields: Pathology and hematology
- Workplaces: University of Tennessee 1929; St. Jude Children's Research Hospital 1962

Lemuel Whitley Diggs (January 8, 1900 – January 8, 1995) was an American pathologist who specialized in sickle cell anemia and hematology.

== Biography ==
Diggs was born in Hampton, Virginia, but spent most of his life and did most of his work in Memphis, Tennessee. He received his undergraduate and master's degrees from Randolph-Macon College, and his medical degree in 1925 from Johns Hopkins University School of Medicine. He joined the faculty of the University of Tennessee in Memphis in 1929 and later became Director of Medical Laboratories.

In 1938 he helped create in Memphis the first blood bank in the South, only the fourth in the US. He helped Danny Thomas create the St. Jude Children's Research Hospital, also in Memphis, in 1962.

In 1971 his work led to the creation of the first comprehensive research center for sickle cell disease at the University, which later endowed a Professor of Medicine position named after him.

His Morphology of Human Blood Cells, which he co-authored with Ann Bell and medical illustrator Dorothy Sturm, is on its 7th edition and is still used as a textbook.

A 1984 interview with Diggs entitled, History of Medicine in Memphis has been published. Diggs died in January 1995, on his 95th birthday.

== Publications ==
- 1954: (with Dorothy Sturm & Ann Bell) The morphology of blood cells in Wright stained smears of peripheral blood and bone marrow, Chicago: Abbot Laboratories
- 1956: Morphology of Human Blood Cells
- 1933: (with C.F. Ahmann & J. Bibb) "The incidence and significance of the sickle cell trait", Annals of Internal Medicine 7: 769-778
