= Bernbeuren (Verwaltungsgemeinschaft) =

- Verwaltungsgemeinschaft
- Location of Bernbeuren within Weilheim-Schongau district
- Interactive map of Bernbeuren
- Location within Germany Location within Bavaria
- Coordinates: 47°44′N 10°47′E
- Country: Germany
- State: Bavaria
- Admin. region: Upper Bavaria
- District: Weilheim-Schongau
- Seat: Bernbeuren
- Subdivisions: 2 municipalities

Area
  - Total: 66.6 km^{2} (25.7 sq mi)

Population (2025-12-31)
  - Total: 4,150
  - Density: 62.3/km^{2} (161/sq mi)
- Time zone: UTC+01:00 (CET)
  - Summer (DST): UTC+02:00 (CEST)
- Website: www.bernbeuren.de

Bernbeuren is a Verwaltungsgemeinschaft (municipal association) in the district Weilheim-Schongau in Bavaria, Germany. Its seat is in Bernbeuren.

It consists of the following municipalities:

1. Bernbeuren
2. Burggen
