= Bernd Sturm =

German footballer

Personal information
- Date of birth: 17 May 1952
- Height: 1.76 m (5 ft 9 in)
- Position: Defender

Senior career*
| Years | Team | Apps | (Gls) |
| 1977–1981 | KSV Hessen Kassel | | |

Managerial career
- 1996–2003: OSC Vellmar
- 2004–2005: KSV Hessen Kassel
- * Club domestic league appearances and goals

Bernd Sturm (born 17 May 1952) is a German former football player and manager, who played as a defender.
