= Burggen =

- Municipality
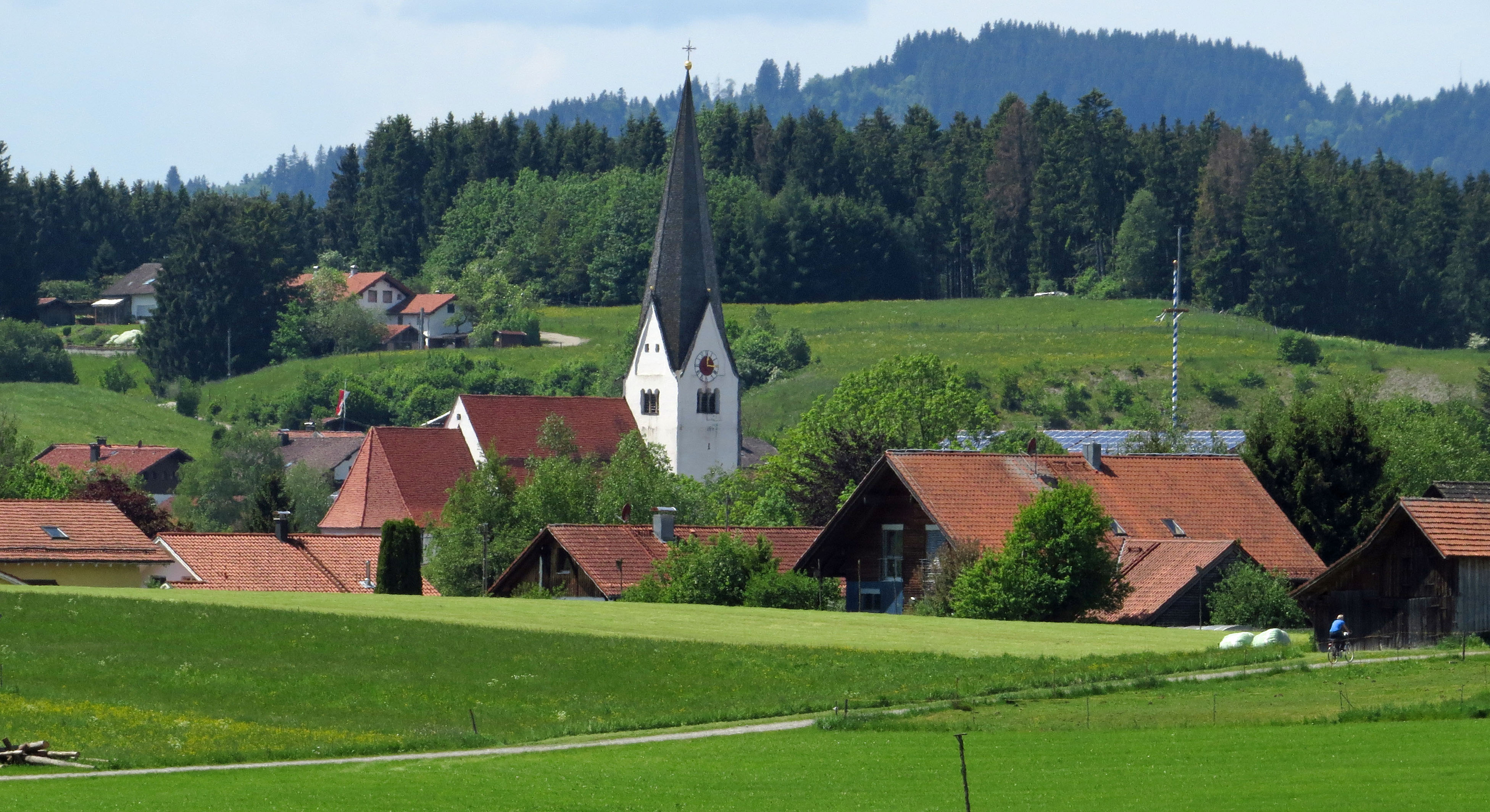
- Burggen seen from the northeast

- Coat of arms

- Location of Burggen within Weilheim-Schongau district
- Interactive map of Burggen
- Location within Germany Location within Bavaria
- Coordinates: 47°47′N 10°49′E
- Country: Germany
- State: Bavaria
- Admin. region: Oberbayern
- District: Weilheim-Schongau
- Municipal assoc.: Bernbeuren

Government
  - Mayor (2022–28): Sandra Brendl-Wolf

Area
  - Total: 24.95 km^{2} (9.63 sq mi)
- Elevation: 745 m (2,444 ft)

Population (2025-12-31)
  - Total: 1,743
  - Density: 69.86/km^{2} (180.9/sq mi)
- Time zone: UTC+01:00 (CET)
  - Summer (DST): UTC+02:00 (CEST)
- Postal codes: 86977
- Dialling codes: 08860
- Vehicle registration: WM
- Website: www.burggen.de

Burggen (German pronunciation: [ˈbʊʁɡn̩]) is a municipality in the Weilheim-Schongau district, in Bavaria, Germany.

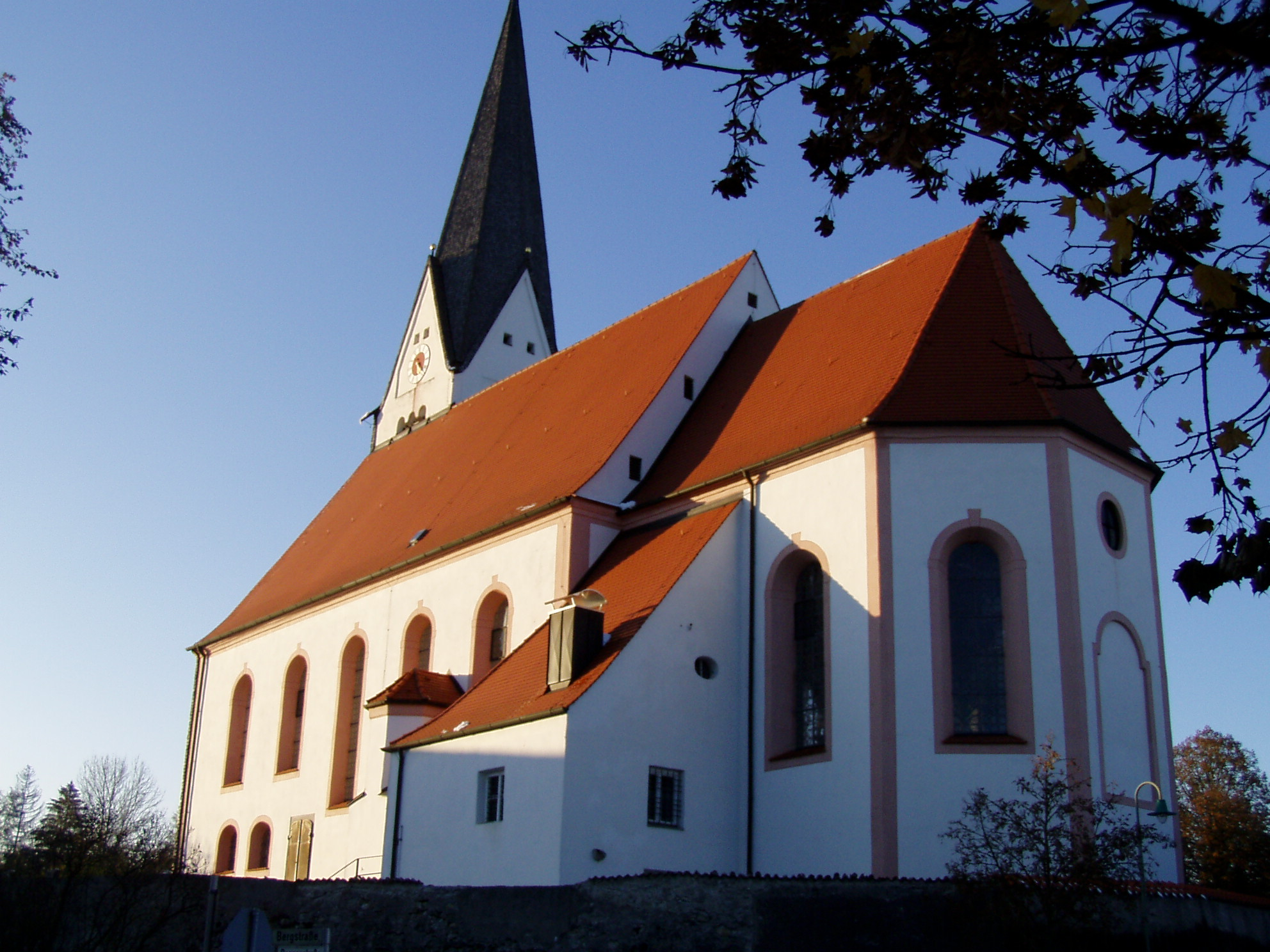
Burggen - Parish church of St. Stephan
