= Daniel Sturm =

German-American journalist (born 1970)

- Sturm in 2016
- Born: December 27, 1970 (age 55); Germany
- Occupations: Journalist, researcher, knowledge manager, humanitarian aid grants manager

Daniel Sturm (born December 27, 1970) is a German-American progressive journalist, senior grants manager, and monitoring, evaluation, research and learning professional. He holds a master's degree in Comparative Literature and the Anthropology of Religion from the University of Tübingen. Originally from Germany, since moving to the United States, Sturm has worked as a reporter, professor and knowledge manager in the humanitarian aid and refugee service sectors.

== Journalism career ==
Before moving to the U.S., Sturm worked for German regional and national media, including national daily newspapers such as Die Welt, Berliner Zeitung, and Südkurier, and as the Chief Editor of the monthly-illustrated magazine Kreuzer in Leipzig. In 2002, after moving to the U.S. Sturm became a staff writer for City Pulse, a popular alternative newsweekly in Lansing, Michigan. From 2004 to 2006, he worked as a full-time journalism instructor at Youngstown State University and as the faculty adviser for the student newspaper, The Jambar. He co-edits a popular online German literary and cultural studies magazine, parapluie, founded together with University of Tübingen colleagues in 1995. Daniel is the co-author of Stadiongeschichten, a 2002 book on stadium politics, sports history and urban planning in Leipzig (Germany).

== Nonprofit career ==
In 2005, Sturm established prisonersolidarity.org, a website and listserv that publishes research, news, opinion pieces and educational material from activists, writers, prisoners, and the concerned public. The Prisonersolidarity project (which has 650 subscribers) was inspired by his work with labor and civil rights attorneys Staughton and Alice Lynd, and the families and community groups involved in the Youngstown Prison Forum.

Daniel Sturm is a knowledge management and monitoring, evaluation and learning professional. With senior-level expertise in grants management, program evaluation and nonprofit training, Sturm has contributed to empowering marginalized populations and raising organizational excellence. Sturm has worked as a Research and Evaluation Manager for Migration and Refugee Services, United States Conference of Catholic Bishops, where he has co-developed several successful multi-million dollar federal proposals, as well as privately funded projects. From 2007 to 2010 he was a Consultant for RefugeeWorks, the National Center for Refugee Employment and Self-Sufficiency at Lutheran Immigration and Refugee Service, where he managed the production of nationally circulated publications, handled all strategic marketing projects and gave informative presentations at conferences and workshops throughout the United States. Sturm edits the Refugee Research Blog that aggregates research findings on issues relevant to international migration and refugee integration practitioners, including employment, language, housing, social capital, volunteer and community support. In 2017, Sturm met with volunteers, nonprofit members and resettlement practitioners during a research sabbatical, to study Germany's the welcome of one million Syrian refugees, and to foster a dialogue about best practices and service delivery. He holds a master's degree in literature, Linguistics and Anthropology from the University of Tübingen. He is an alumnus of a Distinguished ifp Journalism School in Munich, Germany.
