= Bernbeuren =

- Municipality
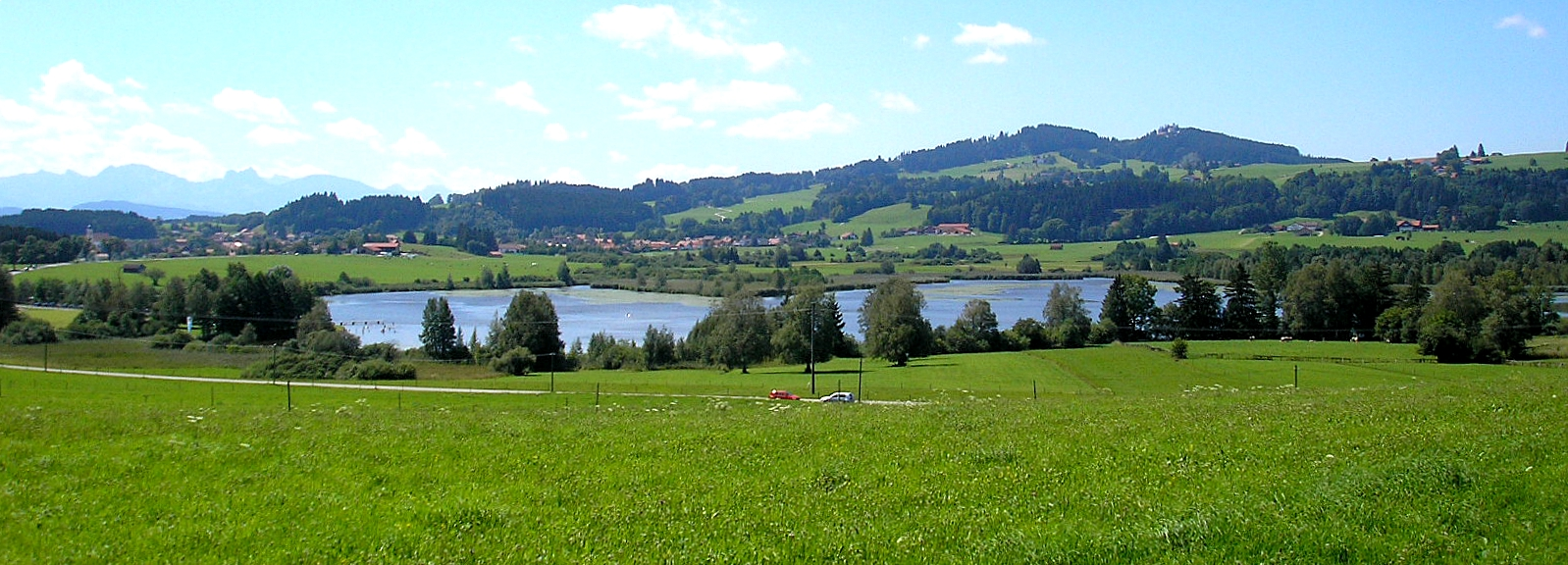
- Lake Haslach near Bernbeuren with Mount Auerberg

- Coat of arms

- Location of Bernbeuren within Weilheim-Schongau district
- Interactive map of Bernbeuren
- Location within Germany Location within Bavaria
- Coordinates: 47°44′17″N 10°46′43″E
- Country: Germany
- State: Bavaria
- Admin. region: Upper Bavaria
- District: Weilheim-Schongau
- Municipal assoc.: Bernbeuren

Government
  - Mayor (2020–26): Karl Schleich

Area
  - Total: 41.65 km^{2} (16.08 sq mi)
- Elevation: 773 m (2,536 ft)

Population (2025-12-31)
  - Total: 2,407
  - Density: 57.79/km^{2} (149.7/sq mi)
- Time zone: UTC+01:00 (CET)
  - Summer (DST): UTC+02:00 (CEST)
- Postal codes: 86975
- Dialling codes: 08860
- Vehicle registration: WM
- Website: www.bernbeuren.de

Bernbeuren (German pronunciation: [bɛʁnˈbɔʏʁən]) is a municipality in the Weilheim-Schongau district, in Bavaria, Germany.
