= Dorothy Sturm =

American medical illustrator (1910–1988)

- Born: August 2, 1910; Memphis, Tennessee
- Died: March 9, 1988 (aged 77); Shelby County, Tennessee
- Known for: Illustration, Enameler, Educator

Dorothy Sturm (August 2, 1910 – March 9, 1988) was an American artist and educator. She is known for her medical illustrations and her enamel work on metal.

Sturm was born on August 2, 1910, in Memphis, Tennessee. In 1929 she moved to New York where she studied at the Grand Central School of Art and the Art Students League of New York. In New York she became interested in blood cells through her friend Dr. Florence R. Sabin. She studied biology at Columbia University and began creating medical illustrations. She provided the illustrations for the 1956 textbook Morphology of Human Blood Cells by Lemuel Diggs.

In 1934 Sturm returned to Tennessee where she began her career at the Memphis Academy of Art. She was a faculty member until her retirement as a professor emeritus in 1975. In the early 1950s Sturm began working with enamel on metal. She fired her pieces at a high temperature, giving the surface a unique cracked surface.

From 1934 through 1970 Sturm exhibited her work at the Betty Parsons Gallery. In 1956 her work was included in the exhibition Craftsmen in Contemporary Enamels. In 1959 her work was included in the exhibition entitled Enamels at the Museum of Contemporary Crafts.

Sturm died on March 9, 1988, in Shelby County, Tennessee. Her papers are in the Archives of American Art. In 1995 Sturm was honored by the Women of Achievement organization in Memphis.
