= Strum (surname) =

Strum is a surname, altered form of Ström, Strøm, Sturm or Strom. Notable people with the surname include:

- Bill Strum (1938–2010), American curler
- Charles Strum (1948–2021), American journalist
- Dana Strum (born 1958), American bass guitarist
- Gladys Strum (1906–2005), Canadian politician
- Hilde Strum (20th century), Austrian luger
- Louie Willard Strum (1890–1954), American lawyer
- Mike Strum (born 1963), American curler

== See also ==
- Joe Strummer (1952–2002), British musician
