= August Sturm (gymnast) =

Austrian gymnast (1912–1990)

- Full name: Josef August Sturm
- Born: 1 February 1912
- Died: 8 January 1990 (aged 77)

Gymnastics career
- Discipline: Men's artistic gymnastics
- Country represented: Austria

Josef August Sturm (1 February 1912 – 8 January 1990) was an Austrian gymnast. He competed in eight events at the 1936 Summer Olympics.
