= August Sturm (businessman) =

American businessman (1865–1943)

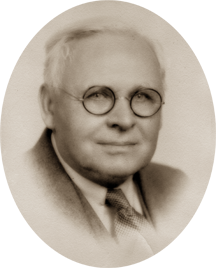
- Portrait of August Daniel Sturm c. 1920
- Born: January 5, 1865; Marion County, Indiana, USA
- Died: March 15, 1943 (aged 78); Indiana, USA
- Occupation: Businessman

August Daniel Sturm (January 5, 1865 – March 15, 1943) was an American businessman. He was one of Indiana's leading canners and was the founder of the Central State Canning Company and the Sturm Canning Company, of which he was president.

== Early life ==
Sturm was born in Marion County, Indiana on January 5, 1865. His parents John (March 1, 1830 – May 7, 1895) and Elizabeth (Greenwalt) (January 15, 1835 – February 2, 1898) Sturm were German immigrants. Two of their children were born in Germany. Owing to conditions of life in Central Europe John Sturm sought better opportunities in the New World. In about 1862, the family arrived in Indianapolis. His first job in Indiana was in a brickyard. A few years later, he became a farmer. He was also a teamster in Indianapolis. They were members of the Zion Evangelical Church.

Sturm attended the common schools of Marion County; for a short time, he was also a student in the Lutheran parochial school. As a small boy, he sold papers on the streets of Indianapolis and shined shoes. At age thirteen, he began regular employment as a farmhand.

After his marriage, he rented a small farm south of the city and lived there for a year or two. From the farm he went to work as a drayman for Charles Roesener of the Central Transfer Company.

Sturm's introduction to the canning business came when he went to work for the Van Camp Packing Company. He was given many responsibilities in their plant, having charge of packing and shipping. With this experience and with his modest capital, he organized the Central State Canning Company in 1914; he also became its president.

== Central State Canning Company ==
In 1914, Sturm founded the Central State Canning Company was founded in Indianapolis. The Central State Canning Company had a large plant on the southside of Indianapolis, principally canning corn, peas, beans and pumpkins. These goods were distributed principally through the retail trade across the Midwest.

In 1916, The Central State Canning Company incorporated, followed with an announcement of $25,000 of preferred stock.

== Sturm Canning Company ==
In 1919, Sturm founded the Sturm Canning Company in Bargersville, Johnson County, Indiana.

== Personal life ==
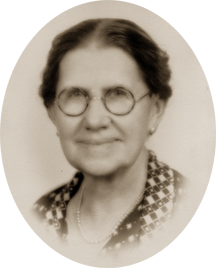
Circa 1920 Portrait of Emma Louise Hartman Sturm 1866–1954

August married Emma Louise Hartman at the Zion Evangelical Church in Indianapolis, Indiana on November 28, 1889. Together they had three children, Ada Ellen Sturm Webb Morgan (1891–1980), Richard John Sturm (1893–1955) and Anna Elizabeth Sturm Robinson (1895–1982).

August died March 15, 1943, while Emma died April 5, 1954. Both are buried at Round Hill Cemetery.
